= List of cities in Taiwan =

Special municipality City County-administered city

Population density of Taiwan by region

In the structural hierarchy of the administrative divisions in Taiwan, there are three types of administrative divisions with the Chinese word shì (市, "city") in their names.

Name	Chinese	Hanyu Pinyin	Taiwanese Pe̍h-ōe-jī	No.
Special municipality	直轄市	zhíxiáshì	ti̍t-hat-chhī	6
City	省轄市	shěngxiáshì	séng-hâ-chhī	3
County-administered city	縣轄市	xiànxiáshì	koān-hat-chhī	14

== Cities in Taiwan ==
There are 23 cities under the administrative divisions of Taiwan. Most of them are located within Taiwan:

Name	Chinese	Hanyu Pinyin	Taiwanese Pe̍h-ōe-jī	County	Founded	Population (Aug. 2025)
Kaohsiung	高雄市	Gāoxióng Shì	Ko-hiông-chhī	—N/a	1979-07-01	2,722,984
New Taipei	新北市	Xīnběi Shì	Sin-pak-chhī	—N/a	2010-12-25	4,047,131
Taichung	臺中市	Táizhōng Shì	Tâi-tiong-chhī	—N/a	2010-12-25	2,867,848
Tainan	臺南市	Táinán Shì	Tâi-lâm-chhī	—N/a	2010-12-25	1,855,568
Taipei	臺北市	Táiběi Shì	Tâi-pak-chhī	—N/a	1967-07-01	2,447,111
Taoyuan	桃園市	Táoyuán Shì	Thô-hn̂g-chhī	—N/a	2014-12-25	2,136,702
Chiayi	嘉義市	Jiāyì Shì	Ka-gī-chhī	—N/a	1982-07-01	269,890
Hsinchu	新竹市	Xīnzhú Shì	Sin-tek-chhī	—N/a	1982-07-01	436,220
Keelung	基隆市	Jīlóng Shì	Ke-lâng-chhī	—N/a	1945-10-25	372,019
Changhua	彰化市	Zhānghuà Shì	Chiong-hòa-chhī or Chiang-hòa-chhī	Changhua	1951-12-01	234,721
Douliu	斗六市	Dǒuliù Shì	Táu-la̍k-chhī	Yunlin	1981-12-25	108,098
Hualien	花蓮市	Huālián Shì	Hoa-lian-chhī or Hoa-liân-chhī	Hualien	1946-01-16	106,368
Magong	馬公市	Mǎgōng Shì	Má-keng-chhī	Penghu	1981-12-25	60,335
Miaoli	苗栗市	Miáolì Shì	Biâu-le̍k-chhī or Miâu-le̍k-chhī	Miaoli	1981-12-25	90,963
Nantou	南投市	Nántóu Shì	Lâm-tâu-chhī	Nantou	1981-12-25	102,314
Pingtung	屏東市	Píngdōng Shì	Pîn-tong-chhī	Pingtung	1951-12-01	203,866
Puzi	朴子市	Púzǐ Shì	Phò-chú-chhī	Chiayi	1992-09-10	43,250
Taibao	太保市	Tàibǎo Shì	Thài-pó-chhī	Chiayi	1991-07-01	37,038
Taitung	臺東市	Táidōng Shì	Tâi-tang-chhī	Taitung	1976-01-01	106,969
Toufen	頭份市	Tóufèn Shì	Thâu-hūn-chhī	Miaoli	2015-10-05	102,654
Yilan	宜蘭市	Yílán Shì	Gî-lân-chhī	Yilan	1946-01-16	95,879
Yuanlin	員林市	Yuánlín Shì	Oân-lîm-chhī	Changhua	2015-08-08	124,730
Zhubei	竹北市	Zhúběi Shì	Tek-pak-chhī	Hsinchu	1988-10-31	203,195

== City-Gallery Largest cities of Taiwan ==
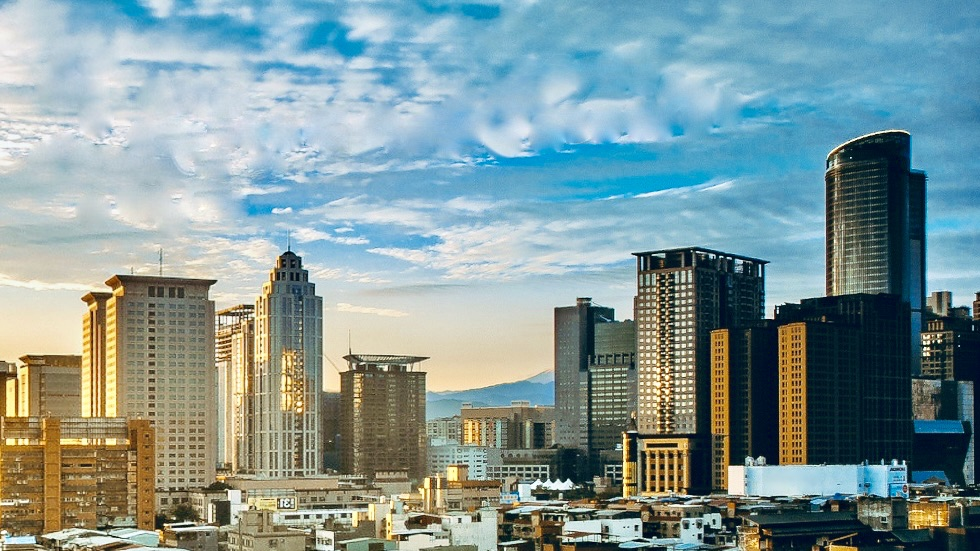
New Taipei, Taiwan's largest city formerly Taipei County.

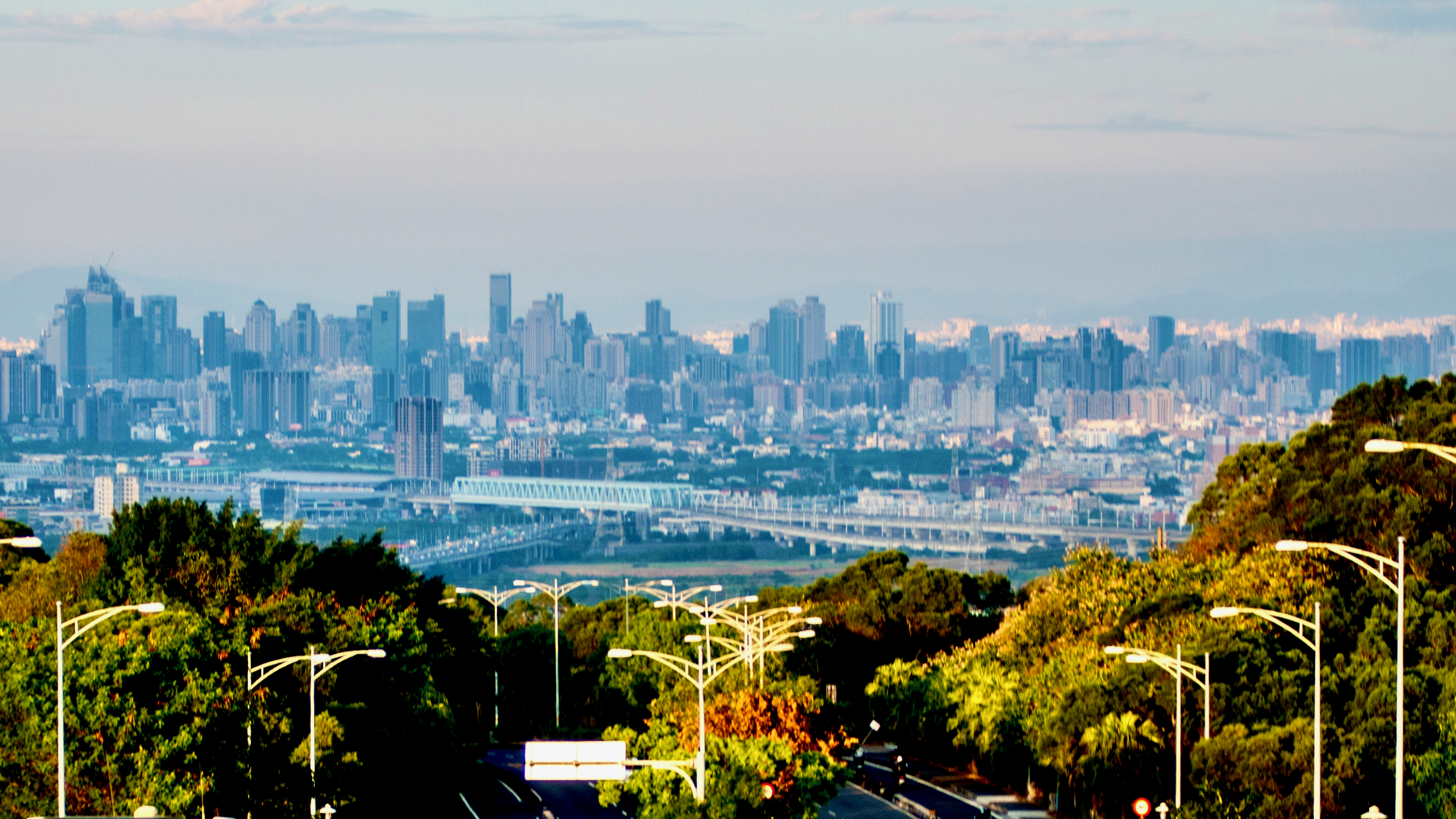
Taichung, Taiwan's second largest city.

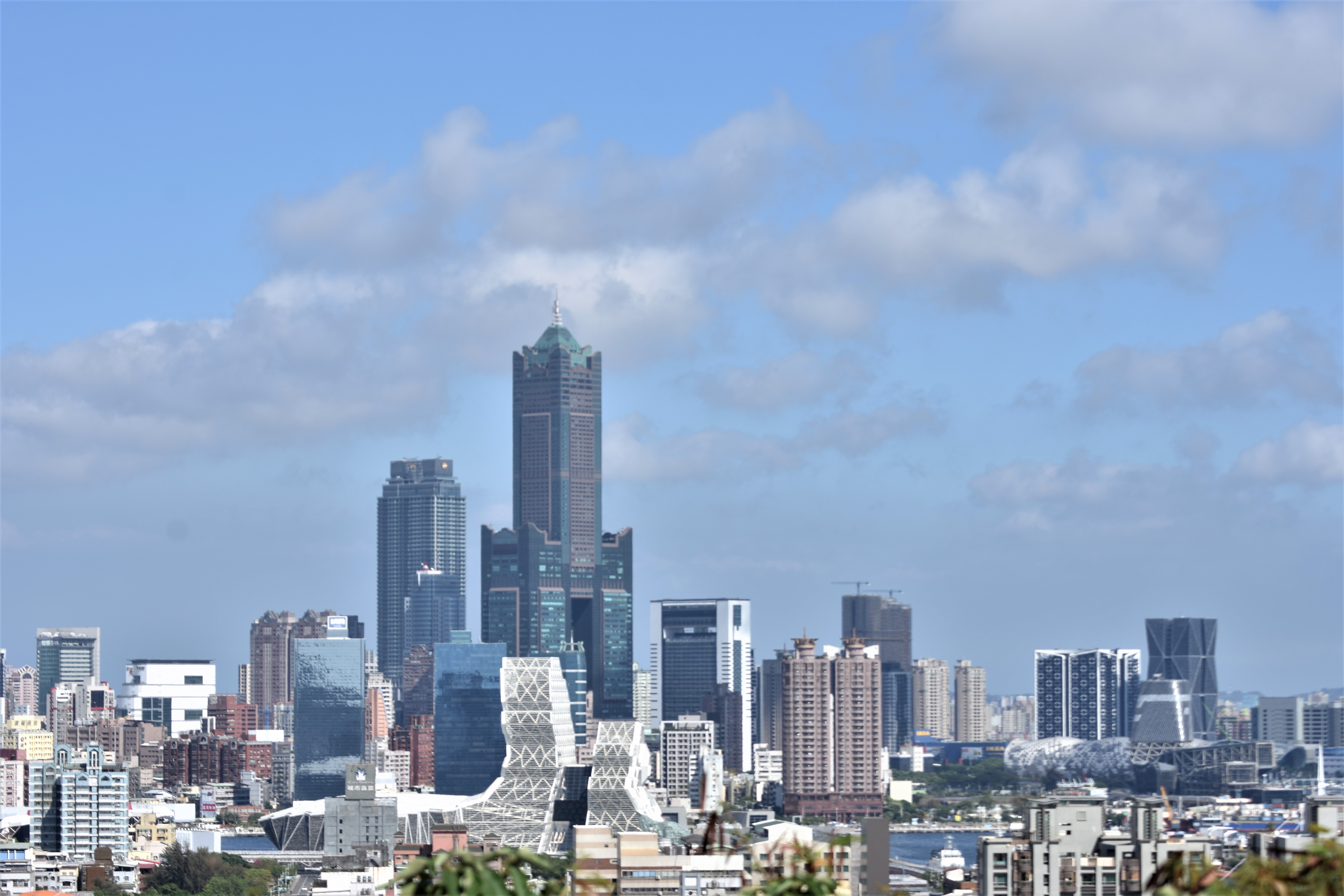
Kaohsiung, Taiwan's largest port city and third largest city.

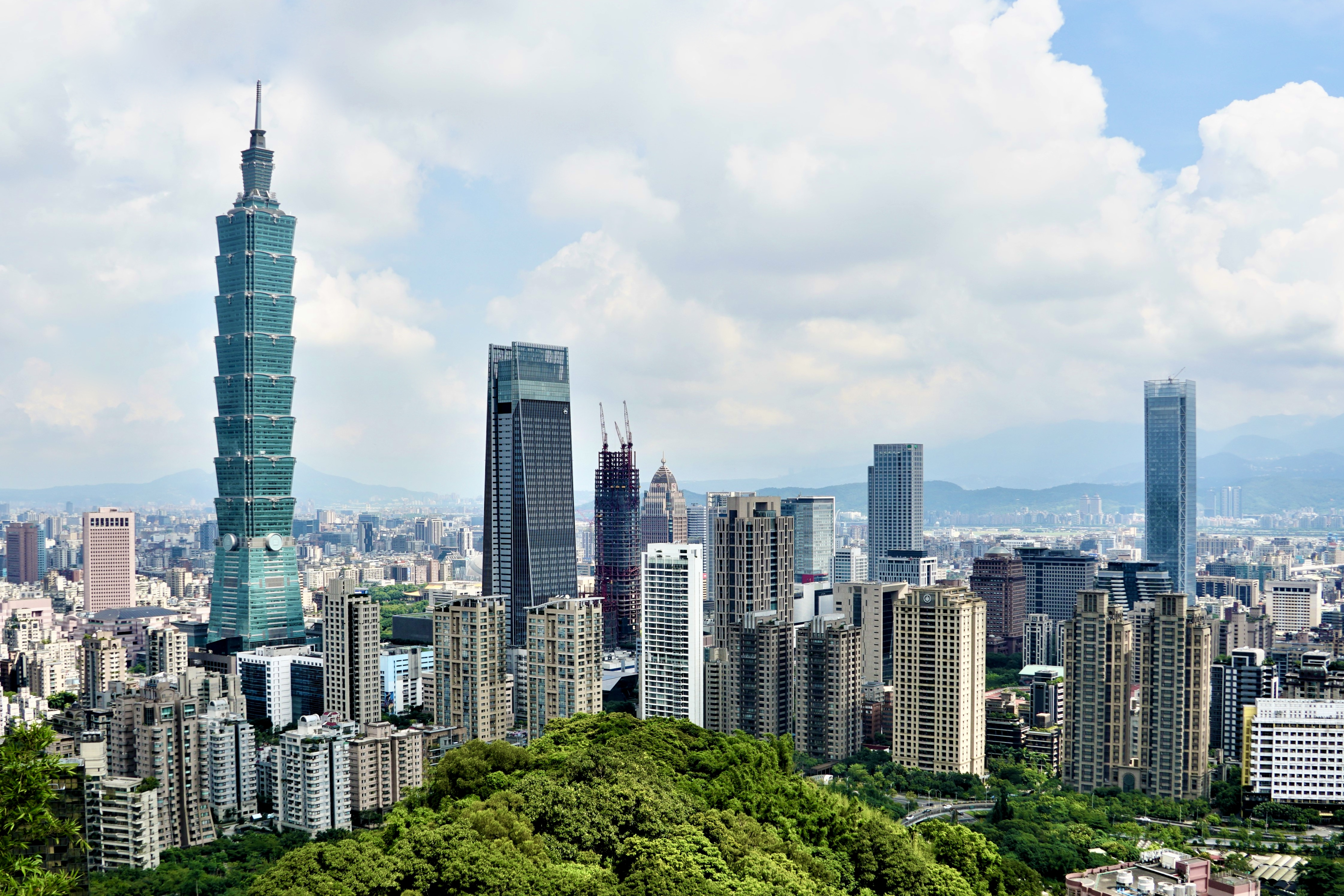
Taipei, Taiwan's fourth largest city and the seat of the ROC government.

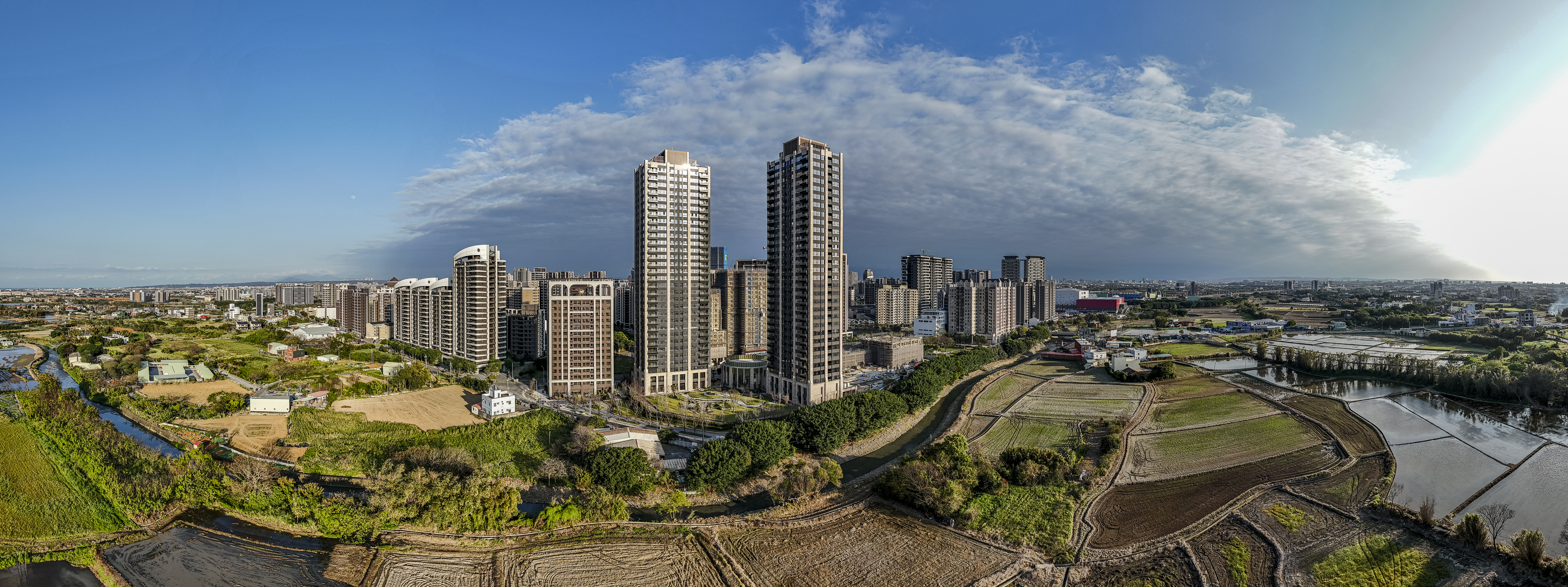
Taoyuan, Taiwan's largest airport, Taiwan Taoyuan International Airport is located in this city.

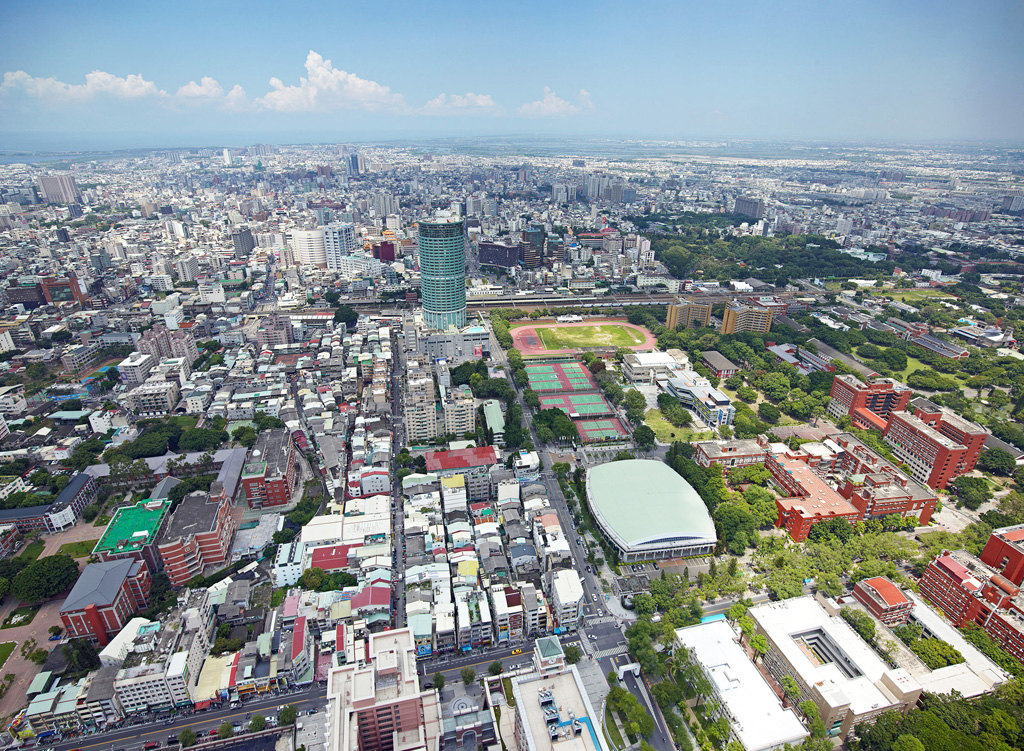
Tainan, Taiwan's ancient capital.

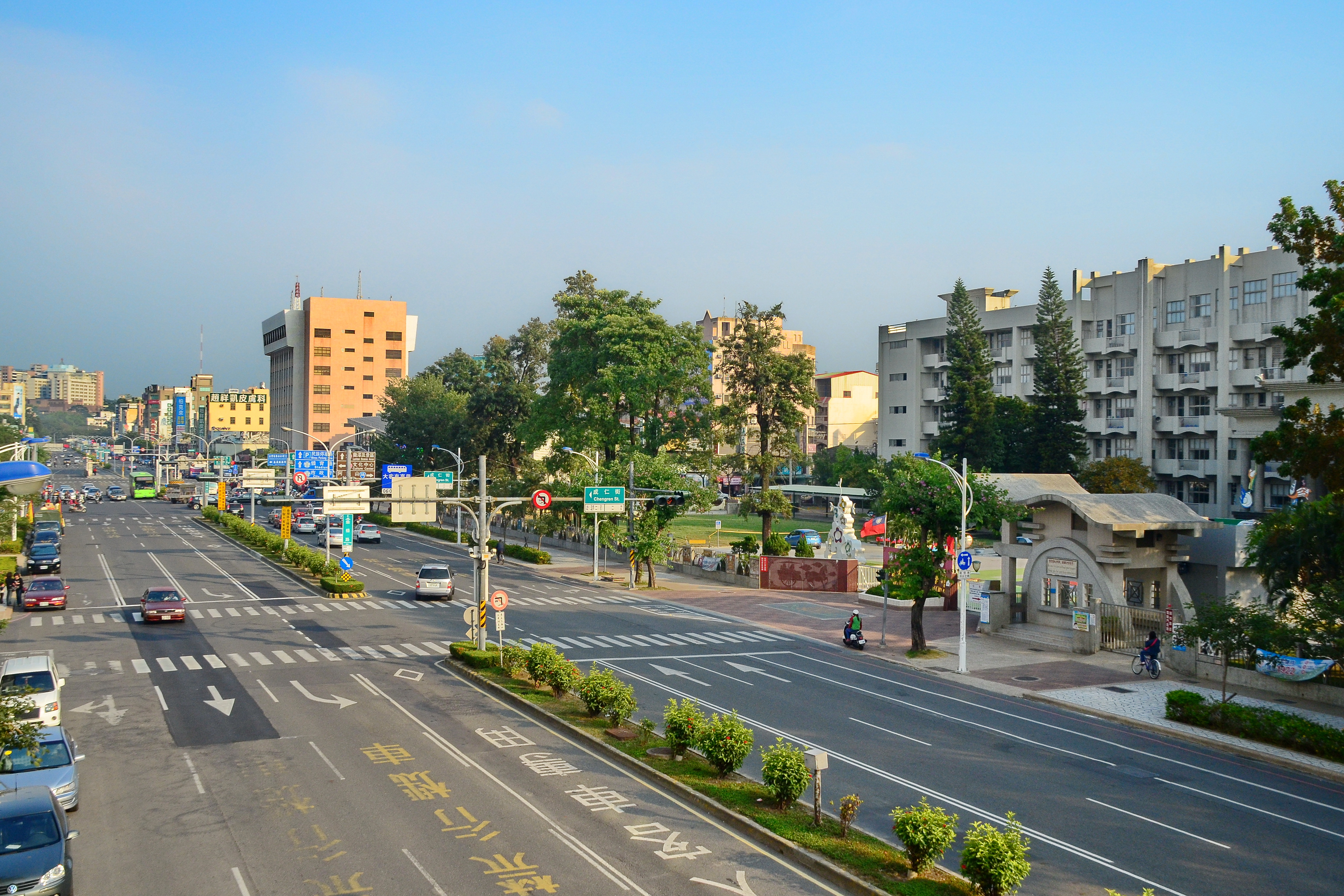
Chiayi, city near the Alishan Forest Railway.

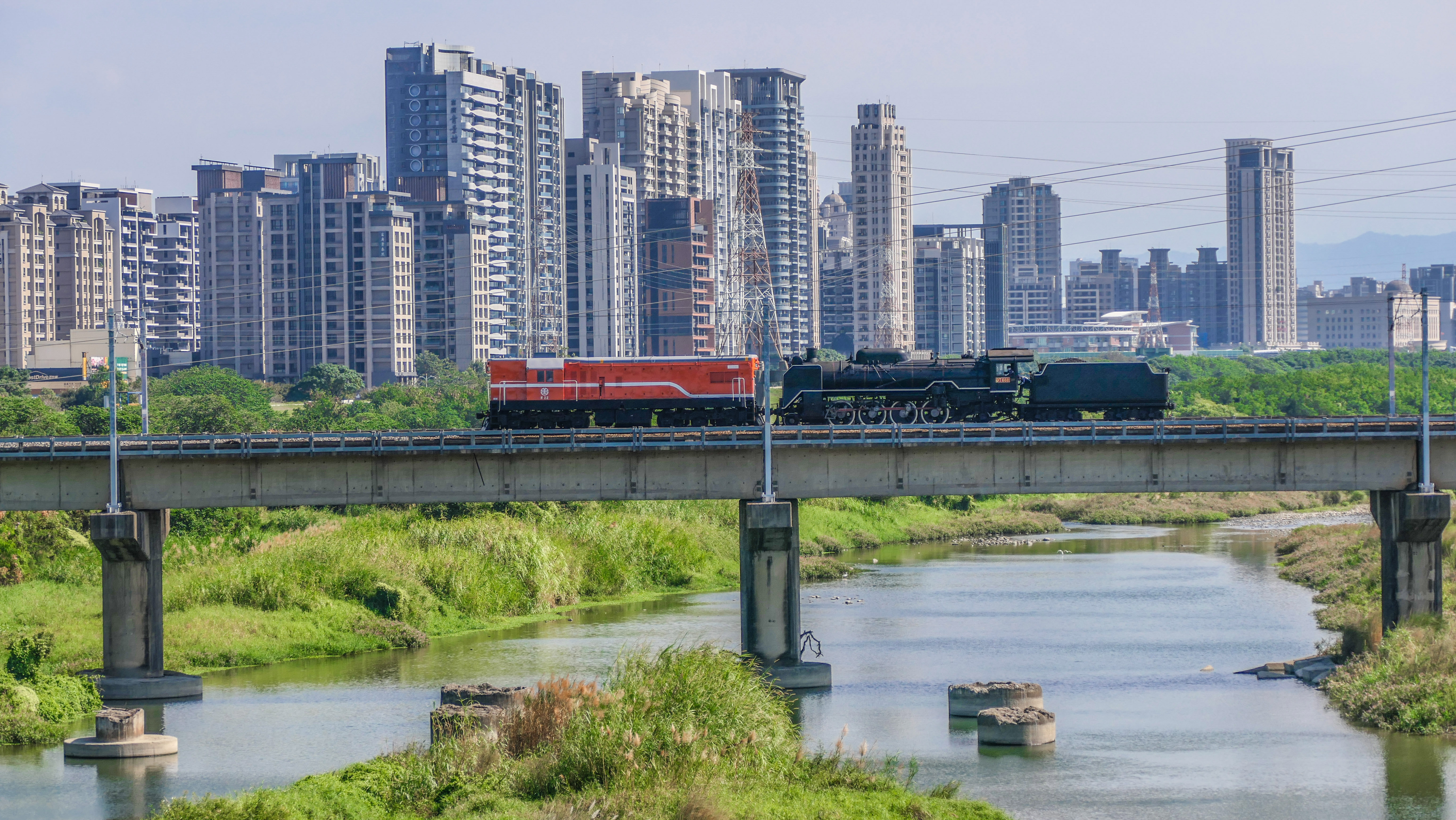
Hsinchu, home to Taiwan's "silicon valley".

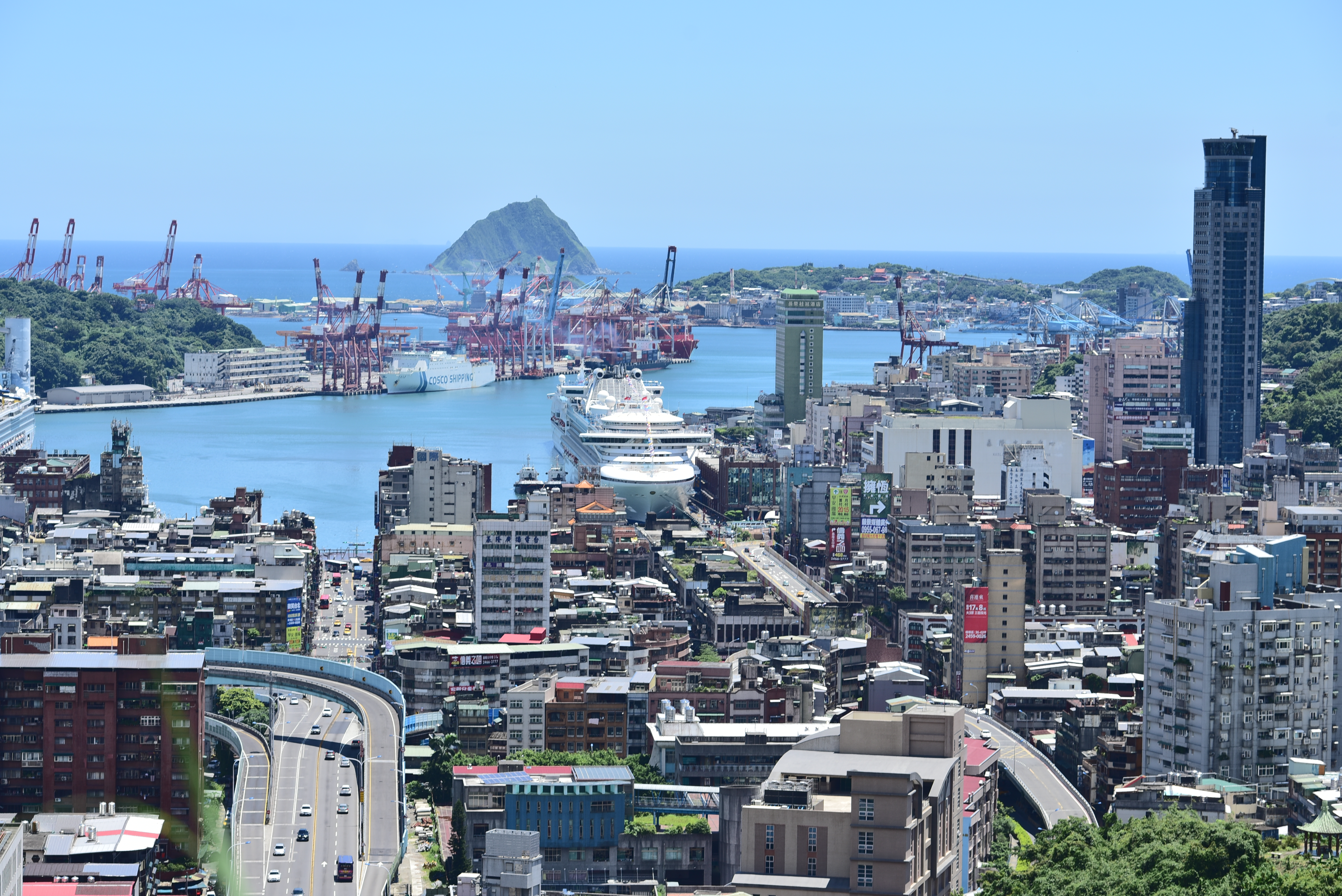
Keelung, largest port city in Northern Taiwan.

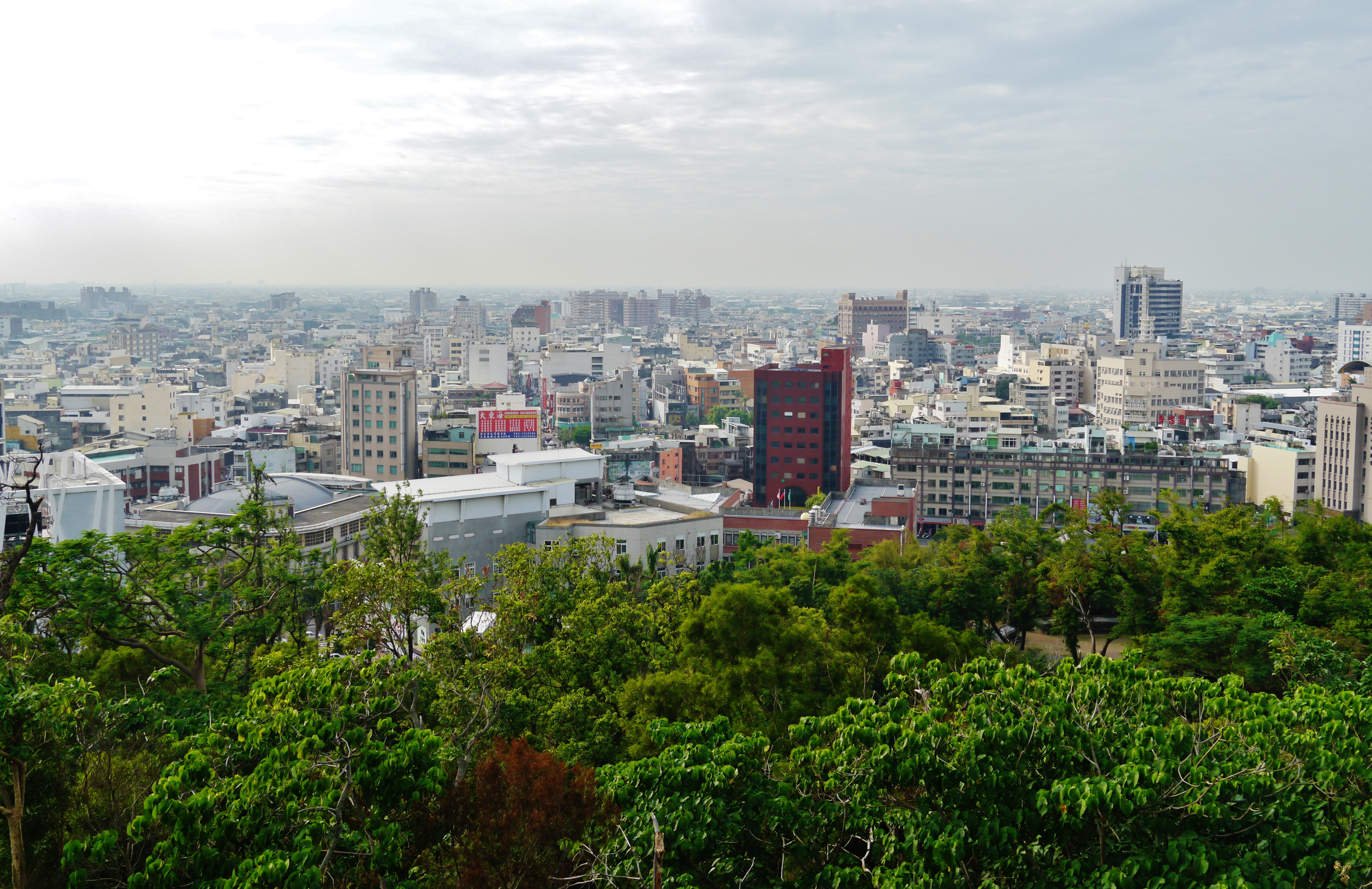
Changhua, largest county-administered city in Taiwan.

== Former cities ==
=== Dissolved prefectural cities ===
Second level political division of Taiwan Cities / 市 (shi, chhī) Districts / 郡 (gun, kūn) Subprefectures / 支廳 (shichō, chi-thiaⁿ)

Name	Japanese	Taiwanese Pe̍h-ōe-jī	Prefecture	Founded	Dissolved	Successor division
Taihoku	臺北市	Tâi-pak-chhī	Taihoku	1920-10-01	1945-10-25	Became city of Taipei
Taichū	臺中市	Tâi-tiong-chhī	Taichū	1920-10-01	1945-10-25	Became city of Taichung
Tainan	臺南市	Tâi-lâm-chhī	Tainan	1920-10-01	1945-10-25	Became city of Tainan
Kīrun	基隆市	Ke-lâng-chhī	Taihoku	1924-12-25	1945-10-25	Became city of Keelung
Takao	高雄市	Ko-hiông-chhī	Takao	1924-12-25	1945-10-25	Became city of Kaohsiung
Shinchiku	新竹市	Sin-tek-chhī	Shinchiku	1930-01-20	1945-10-25	Became city of Hsinchu
Kagi	嘉義市	Ka-gī-chhī	Tainan	1930-01-20	1945-10-25	Became city of Chiayi
Shōka	彰化市	Chiong-hòa-chhī	Taichū	1933-12-20	1945-10-25	Became city of Changhua
Heitō	屏東市	Pîn-tong-chhī	Takao	1933-12-20	1945-10-25	Became city of Pingtung
Giran	宜蘭市	Gî-lân-chhī	Taihoku	1940-10-01	1945-10-25	Became county-administered city of Yilan
Karenkō	花蓮港市	Hoa-liân-káng-chhī	Karenkō	1940-10-01	1945-10-25	Became county-administered city of Hualien

=== Dissolved provincial cities ===
Name	Chinese	Taiwanese Pe̍h-ōe-jī	Founded	Dissolved	Successor division
Changhua	彰化市	Chiong-hòa-chhī or Chiang-hòa-chhī	1945-10-25	1951-12-01	Became a county-administered city in Changhua County
Pingtung	屏東市	Pîn-tong-chhī	1945-10-25	1951-12-01	Became a county-administered city in Pingtung County
Taipei	臺北市	Tâi-pak-chhī	1945-10-25	1967-07-01	Became a special municipality
Kaohsiung	高雄市	Ko-hiông-chhī	1945-10-25	1979-07-01	Became a special municipality
Taichung	臺中市	Tâi-tiong-chhī	1945-10-25	2010-12-25	Became part of the special municipality of Taichung
Tainan	臺南市	Tâi-lâm-chhī	1945-10-25	2010-12-25	Became part of the special municipality of Tainan

=== Dissolved county-administered cities ===
Name	Chinese	Taiwanese Pe̍h-ōe-jī	County	Founded	Dissolved	Successor division
Chiayi	嘉義市	Ka-gī-chhī	Chiayi	1950-08-16	1982-07-01	Became a provincial city
Hsinchu	新竹市	Sin-tek-chhī	Hsinchu	1951-12-01	1982-07-01	Became a provincial city
Fengshan	鳳山市	Hōng-soaⁿ-chhī	Kaohsiung	1972-07-01	2010-12-25	Became a district in special municipality of Kaohsiung
Sanchong	三重市	Sam-tiông-chhī	Taipei	1962-04-01	2010-12-25	Became a district in special municipality of New Taipei
Banqiao	板橋市	Pang-kiô-chhī	Taipei	1972-07-01	2010-12-25	Became a district in special municipality of New Taipei
Yonghe	永和市	Éng-hô-chhī	Taipei	1979-01-01	2010-12-25	Became a district in special municipality of New Taipei
Zhonghe	中和市	Tiong-hô-chhī	Taipei	1979-01-01	2010-12-25	Became a district in special municipality of New Taipei
Xindian	新店市	Sin-tiàm-chhī	Taipei	1980-01-15	2010-12-25	Became a district in special municipality of New Taipei
Xinzhuang	新莊市	Sin-chng-chhī	Taipei	1980-01-15	2010-12-25	Became a district in special municipality of New Taipei
Tucheng	土城市	Thô͘-siâⁿ-chhī	Taipei	1993-06-26	2010-12-25	Became a district in special municipality of New Taipei
Luzhou	蘆洲市	Lô͘-chiu-chhī	Taipei	1997-10-06	2010-12-25	Became a district in special municipality of New Taipei
Xizhi	汐止市	Se̍k-chí-chhī	Taipei	1999-07-01	2010-12-25	Became a district in special municipality of New Taipei
Shulin	樹林市	Chhiū-nâ-chhī	Taipei	1999-10-04	2010-12-25	Became a district in special municipality of New Taipei
Fengyuan	豐原市	Hong-goân-chhī	Taichung	1976-03-01	2010-12-25	Became a district in special municipality of Taichung
Dali	大里市	Tāi-lí-chhī	Taichung	1993-11-01	2010-12-25	Became a district in special municipality of Taichung
Taiping	太平市	Thài-pêng-chhī	Taichung	1996-08-01	2010-12-25	Became a district in special municipality of Taichung
Xinying	新營市	Sin-iâⁿ-chhī	Tainan	1981-12-25	2010-12-25	Became a district in special municipality of Tainan
Yongkang	永康市	Éng-khong-chhī	Tainan	1993-05-01	2010-12-25	Became a district in special municipality of Tainan
Bade	八德市	Pat-tek-chhī	Taoyuan	1995-01-01	2014-12-25	Became a district in special municipality of Taoyuan
Luzhu	蘆竹市	Lô͘-tek-chhī	Taoyuan	2014-06-03	2014-12-25	Became a district in special municipality of Taoyuan
Pingzhen	平鎮市	Pêng-tìn-chhī	Taoyuan	1992-03-01	2014-12-25	Became a district in special municipality of Taoyuan
Taoyuan	桃園市	Thô-hn̂g-chhī	Taoyuan	1971-04-21	2014-12-25	Became a district in special municipality of Taoyuan
Yangmei	楊梅市	Iûⁿ-mûi-chhī	Taoyuan	2010-08-01	2014-12-25	Became a district in special municipality of Taoyuan
Zhongli	中壢市	Tiong-le̍k-chhī	Taoyuan	1967-07-01	2014-12-25	Became a district in special municipality of Taoyuan

== Alphabetical list of all cities and townships ==
List of all cities and townships in the Republic of China, consisting of six special municipalities and two provinces without administrative function.

- For the subdivisions under special municipalities and cities, see District (Taiwan)
- For the subdivisions sort by county, see Township (Taiwan)

=== A ===
- Alishan (阿里山) Chiayi County

=== B ===
- Baisha (白沙) Penghu County
- Baozhong (褒忠) Yunlin County
- Baoshan (寳山) Hsinchu County
- Beidou (北斗) Changhua County
- Beigan (北竿) Lienchiang County
- Beigang (北港) Yunlin County
- Beinan (卑南) Taitung County
- Beipu (北埔) Hsinchu County
- Budai (布袋) Chiayi County

=== C ===
- Caotun (草屯) Nantou County
- Changbin (長濱) Taitung County
- Changhua [Zhanghua] (彰化) Changhua County
- Changzhi (長治) Pingtung County
- Chaozhou (潮州) Pingtung County
- Checheng (車城) Pingtung County
- Chenggong (成功) Taitung County
- Chiayi [Jiayi] (嘉義)
- Chishang (池上) Taitung County
- Chunri (春日) Pingtung County
- Cimei (七美) Penghu County
- Citong (莿桐) Yunlin County

=== D ===
- Dacheng (大城) Changhua County
- Dacun (大村) Changhua County
- Dahu (大湖) Miaoli County
- Dalin (大林) Chiayi County
- Dapi (大埤) Yunlin County
- Dapu (大埔) Chiayi County
- Daren (達仁) Taitung County
- Datong (大同) Yilan County
- Dawu (大武) Taitung County
- Donggang (東港) Pingtung County
- Donghe (東河) Taitung County
- Dongshan (冬山) Yilan County
- Dongshi (東石) Chiayi County
- Dongshi (東勢) Yunlin County
- Dongyin (東引) Lienchiang County
- Douliu (斗六) Yunlin County
- Dounan (斗南) Yunlin County

=== E ===
- Emei (峨眉) Hsinchu County
- Erlin (二林) Changhua County
- Erlun (二崙) Yunlin County
- Ershui (二水) Changhua County

=== F ===
- Fangliao (枋寮) Pingtung County
- Fangshan (枋山) Pingtung County
- Fangyuan (芳苑) Changhua County
- Fanlu (番路) Chiayi County
- Fengbin (豐濱) Hualien County
- Fenglin (鳳林) Hualien County
- Fenyuan (芬園) Changhua County
- Fuli (富里) Hualien County
- Fuxing (福興) Changhua County

=== G ===
- Gaoshu (高樹) Pingtung County
- Gongguan (公館) Miaoli County
- Guangfu (光復) Hualien County
- Guanshan (關山) Taitung County
- Guanxi (關西) Hsinchu County
- Gukeng (古坑) Yunlin County
- Guoxing (國姓) Nantou County

=== H ===
- Haiduan (海端) Taitung County
- Hemei (和美) Changhua County
- Hengchun (恆春) Pingtung County
- Hengshan (橫山) Hsinchu County
- Houlong (後龍) Miaoli County
- Hsinchu [Xinzhu] (新竹)
- Hualien [Hualian] (花蓮) Hualien County
- Huatan (花壇) Changhua County
- Hukou (湖口) Hsinchu County
- Huwei (虎尾) Yunlin County
- Huxi (湖西) Penghu County

=== J ===
- Jiadong (佳冬) Pingtung County
- Ji'an (吉安) Hualien County
- Jianshi (尖石) Hsinchu County
- Jiaoxi (礁溪) Yilan County
- Jiji (集集) Nantou County
- Jincheng (金城) Kinmen County
- Jinfeng (金峰) Taitung County
- Jinhu (金湖) Kinmen County
- Jinning (金寧) Kinmen County
- Jinsha (金沙) Kinmen County
- Jiuru (九如) Pingtung County
- Juguang (莒光) Lienchiang County

=== K ===
- Kanding (崁頂) Pingtung County
- Kaohsiung [Gaoxiong] (高雄)
- Keelung [Jilong] (基隆)
- Kouhu (口湖) Yunlin County

=== L ===
- Laiyi (來義) Pingtung County
- Lanyu (蘭嶼) Taitung County
- Lieyu (烈嶼) Kinmen County
- Ligang (里港) Pingtung County
- Linbian (林邊) Pingtung County
- Linluo (麟洛) Pingtung County
- Linnei (林内) Yunlin County
- Lioujiao (六腳) Chiayi County
- Liuqiu (琉球) Pingtung County
- Lucao (鹿草) Chiayi County
- Lüdao (綠島) Taitung County
- Lugu (鹿谷) Nantou County
- Lukang [Lugang] (鹿港) Changhua County
- Lunbei (崙背) Yunlin County
- Luodong (羅東) Yilan County
- Luye (鹿野) Taitung County

=== M ===
- Mailiao (麥寮) Yunlin County
- Majia (瑪家) Pingtung County
- Magong (馬公) Penghu County
- Manzhou (滿州) Pingtung County
- Meishan (梅山) Chiayi County
- Miaoli (苗栗) Miaoli County
- Mingjian (名間) Nantou County
- Minxiong (民雄) Chiayi County
- Mudan (牡丹) Pingtung County

=== N ===
- Nan'ao (南澳) Yilan County
- Nangan (南竿) Lienchiang County
- Nantou (南投) Nantou County
- Nanzhou (南州) Pingtung County
- Nanzhuang (南庄) Miaoli County
- Neipu (内埔) Pingtung County
- New Taipei [Xinbei] (新北)

=== P ===
- Pingtung [Pingdong] (屏東) Pingtung County
- Pitou (埤頭) Changhua County
- Puli (埔里) Nantou County
- Puxin (埔心) Changhua County
- Puyan (埔鹽) Changhua County
- Puzi (朴子) Chiayi County

=== Q ===
- Qionglin (芎林) Hsinchu County

=== R ===
- Ren'ai (仁愛) Nantou County
- Ruisui (瑞穗) Hualien County

=== S ===
- Sandimen (三地門) Pingtung County
- Sanwan (三灣) Miaoli County
- Sanxing (三星) Yilan County
- Sanyi (三義) Miaoli County
- Shengang (伸港) Changhua County
- Shetou (社頭) Changhua County
- Shitan (獅潭) Miaoli County
- Shizi (獅子) Pingtung County
- Shoufeng (壽豐) Hualien County
- Shuili (水里) Nantou County
- Shuilin (水林) Yunlin County
- Shuishang (水上) Chiayi County
- Sihu (四湖) Yunlin County
- Su'ao (蘇澳) Yilan County

=== T ===
- Tai'an (泰安) Miaoli County
- Taibao (太保) Chiayi County
- Taichung [Taizhong] (臺中)
- Taimali (太麻里) Taitung County
- Tainan (臺南)
- Taipei [Taibei] (臺北)
- Taitung [Taidong] (臺東) Taitung County
- Taiwu (泰武) Pingtung County
- Taixi (臺西) Yunlin County
- Taoyuan (桃園)
- Tianwei (田尾) Changhua County
- Tianzhong (田中) Changhua County
- Tongluo (銅鑼) Miaoli County
- Tongxiao (通霄) Miaoli County
- Toucheng (頭城) Yilan County
- Toufen (頭份) Miaoli County
- Touwu (頭屋) Miaoli County
- Tuku (土庫) Yunlin County

=== W ===
- Wandan (萬丹) Pingtung County
- Wangan (望安) Penghu County
- Wanluan (萬巒) Pingtung County
- Wanrong (萬榮) Hualien County
- Wufeng (五峰) Hsinchu County
- Wujie (五結) Yilan County
- Wuqiu (烏坵) Kinmen County
- Wutai (霧臺) Pingtung County

=== X ===
- Xianxi (線西) Changhua County
- Xihu (溪湖) Changhua County
- Xihu (西湖) Miaoli County
- Xikou (溪口) Chiayi County
- Xiluo (西螺) Yunlin County
- Xincheng (新城) Hualien County
- Xinfeng (新豐) Hsinchu County
- Xingang (新港) Chiayi County
- Xinpi (新埤) Pingtung County
- Xinpu (新埔) Hsinchu County
- Xinyi (信義) Nantou County
- Xinyuan (新園) Pingtung County
- Xiulin (秀林) Hualien County
- Xiushui (秀水) Changhua County
- Xiyu (西嶼) Penghu County
- Xizhou (溪州) Changhua County

=== Y ===
- Yanping (延平) Taitung County
- Yanpu (鹽埔) Pingtung County
- Yilan (宜蘭) Yilan County
- Yizhu (義竹) Chiayi County
- Yongjing (永靖) Changhua County
- Yuanchang (元長) Yunlin County
- Yuanli (苑裡) Miaoli County
- Yuanlin (員林) Changhua County
- Yuanshan (員山) Yilan County
- Yuchi (魚池) Nantou County
- Yuli (玉里) Hualien County

=== Z ===
- Zaoqiao (造橋) Miaoli County
- Zhongliao (中寮) Nantou County
- Zhongpu (中埔) Chiayi County
- Zhuangwei (壯圍) Yilan County
- Zhubei (竹北) Hsinchu County
- Zhudong (竹東) Hsinchu County
- Zhunan (竹南) Miaoli County
- Zhuolan (卓蘭) Miaoli County
- Zhuoxi (卓溪) Hualien County
- Zhuqi (竹崎) Chiayi County
- Zhushan (竹山) Nantou County
- Zhutang (竹塘) Changhua County
- Zhutian (竹田) Pingtung County

== Alphabetical list of all cities and townships (Tongyòng Pinyin) ==
Tongyòng Pinyin was the standard of Chinese romanization of Taiwan between 2002 and 2008. Although the standard was shifted to Hànyǔ Pīnyīn from 1 January 2009, the change to signs and documents using Tongyòng Pinyin is not complete. There are still some signs using Tongyòng Pinyin on highways and roads.

=== A ===
- Alishan (阿里山) Chiayi County

=== B ===
- Baisha (白沙) Penghu County
- Baojhong (褒忠) Yunlin County
- Baoshan (寶山) Hsinchu County
- Beidou (北斗) Changhua County
- Beigan (北竿) Lienchiang County
- Beigang (北港) Yunlin County
- Beinan (卑南) Taitung County
- Beipu (北埔) Hsinchu County
- Budai (布袋) Chiayi County

=== C ===
- Caotun (草屯) Nantou County
- Changbin (長濱) Taitung County
- Changhua [Jhanghua] (彰化) Changhua County
- Changjhih (長治) Pingtung County
- Chaojhou (潮州) Pingtung County
- Checheng (車城) Pingtung County
- Chenggong (成功) Taitung County
- Chiayi [Jiayi] (嘉義)
- Chihshang (池上) Taitung County
- Chunrih (春日) Pingtung County
- Cihtong (莿桐) Yunlin County
- Cimei (七美) Penghu County
- Cyonglin (芎林) Hsinchu County

=== D ===
- Dacheng (大城) Changhua County
- Dacun (大村) Changhua County
- Dahu (大湖) Miaoli County
- Dalin (大林) Chiayi County
- Dapi (大埤) Yunlin County
- Dapu (大埔) Chiayi County
- Daren (達仁) Taitung County
- Datong (大同) Yilan County
- Dawu (大武) Taitung County
- Donggang (東港) Pingtung County
- Donghe (東河) Taitung County
- Dongshan (冬山) Yilan County
- Dongshih (東石) Chiayi County
- Dongshih (東勢) Yunlin County
- Dongyin (東引) Lienchiang County
- Douliou (斗六) Yunlin County
- Dounan (斗南) Yunlin County

=== E ===
- Emei (峨眉) Hsinchu County
- Erlin (二林) Changhua County
- Erlun (二崙) Yunlin County
- Ershuei (二水) Changhua County

=== F ===
- Fangliao (枋寮) Pingtung County
- Fangshan (枋山) Pingtung County
- Fangyuan (芳苑) Changhua County
- Fanlu (番路) Chiayi County
- Fenyuan (芬園) Changhua County
- Fongbin (豐濱) Hualien County
- Fonglin (鳳林) Hualien County
- Fuli (富里) Hualien County
- Fusing (福興) Changhua County

=== G ===
- Gaoshu (高樹) Pingtung County
- Gongguan (公館) Miaoli County
- Guangfu (光復) Hualien County
- Guanshan (關山) Taitung County
- Guansi (關西) Hsinchu County
- Gukeng (古坑) Yunlin County
- Guosing (國姓) Nantou County

=== H ===
- Haiduan (海端) Taitung County
- Hemei (和美) Changhua County
- Hengchun (恆春) Pingtung County
- Hengshan (橫山) Hsinchu County
- Houlong (後龍) Miaoli County
- Hsinchu [Sinjhu] (新竹)
- Hualien [Hualian] (花蓮) Hualien County
- Huatan (花壇) Changhua County
- Hukou (湖口) Hsinchu County
- Husi (湖西) Penghu County
- Huwei (虎尾) Yunlin County

=== J ===
- Jhongliao (中寮) Nantou County
- Jhongpu (中埔) Chiayi County
- Jhubei (竹北) Hsinchu County
- Jhuci (竹崎) Chiayi County
- Jhudong (竹東) Hsinchu County
- Jhunan (竹南) Miaoli County
- Jhuolan (卓蘭) Miaoli County
- Jhuosi (卓溪) Hualien County
- Jhushan (竹山) Nantou County
- Jhutang (竹塘) Changhua County
- Jhutian (竹田) Pingtung County
- Jiadong (佳冬) Pingtung County
- Ji-an (吉安) Hualien County
- Jianshih (尖石) Hsinchu County
- Jiaosi (礁溪) Yilan County
- Jiji (集集) Nantou County
- Jincheng (金城) Kinmen County
- Jinfong (金峰) Taitung County
- Jinhu (金湖) Kinmen County
- Jinning (金寧) Kinmen County
- Jinsha (金沙) Kinmen County
- Jiouru (九如) Pingtung County
- Jyuguang (莒光) Lienchiang County

=== K ===
- Kanding (崁頂) Pingtung County
- Kaohsiung [Gaosyong] (高雄)
- Keelung [Jilong] (基隆)
- Kouhu (口湖) Yunlin County

=== L ===
- Laiyi (來義) Pingtung County
- Lanyu (蘭嶼) Taitung County
- Lieyu (烈嶼) Kinmen County
- Ligang (里港) Pingtung County
- Linbian (林邊) Pingtung County
- Linluo (麟洛) Pingtung County
- Linnei (林內) Yunlin County
- Lioujiao (六腳) Chiayi County
- Liouciou (琉球) Pingtung County
- Lucao (鹿草) Chiayi County
- Lugu (鹿谷) Nantou County
- Lukang [Lugang] (鹿港) Changhua County
- Lunbei (崙背) Yunlin County
- Luodong (羅東) Yilan County
- Luye (鹿野) Taitung County
- Lyudao (綠島) Taitung County

=== M ===
- Mailiao (麥寮) Yunlin County
- Majia (瑪家) Pingtung County
- Magong (馬公) Penghu County
- Manjhou (滿州) Pingtung County
- Meishan (梅山) Chiayi County
- Miaoli (苗栗) Miaoli County
- Mingjian (名間) Nantou County
- Minxiong (民雄) Chiayi County
- Mudan (牡丹) Pingtung County

=== N ===
- Nan-ao (南澳) Yilan County
- Nangan (南竿) Lienchiang County
- Nanjhou (南州) Pingtung County
- Nanjhuang (南庄) Miaoli County
- Nantou (南投) Nantou County
- Neipu (內埔) Pingtung County
- New Taipei [Sinbei] (新北)

=== P ===
- Pingtung [Pingdong] (屏東) Pingtung County
- Pitou (埤頭) Changhua County
- Puli (埔里) Nantou County
- Pusin (埔心) Changhua County
- Puyan (埔鹽) Changhua County
- Puzih (朴子) Chiayi County

=== R ===
- Ren-ai (仁愛) Nantou County
- Rueisuei (瑞穗) Hualien County

=== S ===
- Sandimen (三地門) Pingtung County
- Sansing (三星) Yilan County
- Sanwan (三灣) Miaoli County
- Sanyi (三義) Miaoli County
- Shengang (伸港) Changhua County
- Shetou (社頭) Changhua County
- Shihtan (獅潭) Miaoli County
- Shihzih (獅子) Pingtung County
- Shoufong (壽豐) Hualien County
- Shueilin (水林) Yunlin County
- Shueili (水里) Nantou County
- Shueishang (水上) Chiayi County
- Siansi (線西) Changhua County
- Sihhu (四湖) Yunlin County
- Sihu (溪湖) Changhua County
- Sihu (西湖) Miaoli County
- Sijhou (溪州) Changhua County
- Sikou (溪口) Chiayi County
- Siluo (西螺) Yunlin County
- Sincheng (新城) Hualien County
- Sinfong (新豐) Hsinchu County
- Singang (新港) Chiayi County
- Sinpi (新埤) Pingtung County
- Sinpu (新埔) Hsinchu County
- Sinyi (信義) Nantou County
- Sinyuan (新園) Pingtung County
- Sioushuei (秀水) Changhua County
- Sioulin (秀林) Hualien County
- Siyu (西嶼) Penghu County
- Su-ao (蘇澳) Yilan County

=== T ===
- Tai-an (泰安) Miaoli County
- Taibao (太保) Chiayi County
- Taichung [Taijhong] (臺中)
- Taimali (太麻里) Taitung County
- Tainan (臺南)
- Taipei [Taibei] (臺北)
- Taisi (臺西) Yunlin County
- Taitung [Taidong] (臺東) Taitung County
- Taiwu (泰武) Pingtung County
- Taoyuan (桃園)
- Tianjhong (田中) Changhua County
- Tianwei (田尾) Changhua County
- Tongluo (銅鑼) Miaoli County
- Tongsiao (通霄) Miaoli County
- Toucheng (頭城) Yilan County
- Toufen (頭份) Miaoli County
- Touwu (頭屋) Miaoli County
- Tuku (土庫) Yunlin County

=== W ===
- Wandan (萬丹) Pingtung County
- Wang-an (望安) Penghu County
- Wanluan (萬巒) Pingtung County
- Wanrong (萬榮) Hualien County
- Wufong (五峰) Hsinchu County
- Wujie (五結) Yilan County
- Wuciou (烏坵) Kinmen County
- Wutai (霧臺) Pingtung County

=== Y ===
- Yanping (延平) Taitung County
- Yanpu (鹽埔) Pingtung County
- Yijhu (義竹) Chiayi County
- Yilan (宜蘭) Yilan County
- Yongjing (永靖) Changhua County
- Yuanchang (元長) Yunlin County
- Yuanli (苑裡) Miaoli County
- Yuanlin (員林) Changhua County
- Yuanshan (員山) Yilan County
- Yuchih (魚池) Nantou County
- Yuli (玉里) Hualien County

=== Z ===
- Zaociao (造橋) Miaoli County

== See also ==
- List of metropolitan areas in Taiwan
- Administrative divisions of Taiwan
- List of administrative divisions of Taiwan
- Lists of cities by country
- List of metropolitan areas by population

=== Historical ===
- History of the administrative divisions of China (1912–1949)
- List of cities in China
