= Legislative Yuan constituencies in Yunlin County =

Yunlin County
- 2 Single-member constituency for the Legislative Yuan
- District(s): Yunlin County
- Electorate: 556,996

Current constituency
- Created: 2008
- Number of members: 2

Yunlin County legislative districts (Chinese: 雲林縣選舉區; pinyin: Yúnlín Xiàn xuǎnjǔ qū) consist of 2 single-member constituencies, each represented by a member of the Legislative Yuan of Taiwan.

== Current districts ==
- Yunlin County Constituency 1 - Mailiao, Taixi, Dongshi, Baozhong, Tuku, Huwei, Sihu, Yuanchang, Kouhu, Shuilin, Beigang Townships
- Yunlin County Constituency 2 - Lunbei, Erlun, Xiluo, Cihtong, Linnei, Dapi, Dounan, Gukeng Townships, Douliu City
Yunlin County Constituency 1

Yunlin County Constituency 2

== Legislators ==
Kuomintang Democratic Progressive Party

Election	Yunlin County 1	Yunlin County 2
2008 7th	Chang Chia-chun	Chang Sho-wen (2008-2009)^{1}
2009 by-election	Chang Chia-chun	Liu Chien-kuo
2012 8th	Chang Chia-chun	Liu Chien-kuo
2016 9th	Su Chih-fen	Liu Chien-kuo
2020 10th	Su Chih-fen	Liu Chien-kuo
2024 11th	Ting Hsueh-Chung	Liu Chien-kuo

Chang Sho-wen resigned in 2009 due to election fraud.
