= Tainan Prefecture =

Tainan Prefecture 臺南州/台南州
- Tainan-shū
- 1920-1952
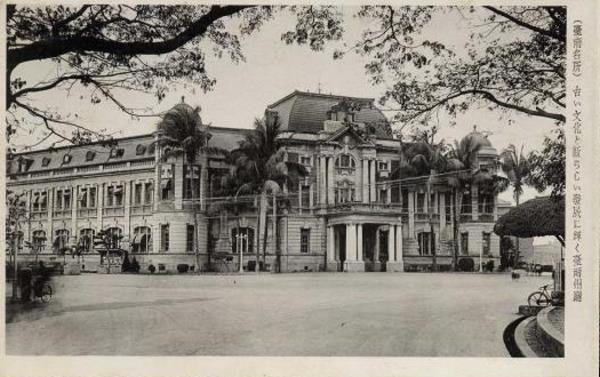
- The Tainan Prefecture government building, which now serves as the National Museum of Taiwan Literature
- Capital: Tainan
- Population
  - 1941: 1,550,695
- Historical era: Taiwan under Japanese rule
  - Established: 1920
  - Disestablished: 25 October 1945
  - Treaty of San Francisco: 28 April 1952
- Political subdivisions: 2 cities (市); 10 districts (郡)
- Today part of: Tainan City, Chiayi City, Chiayi County and Yunlin County

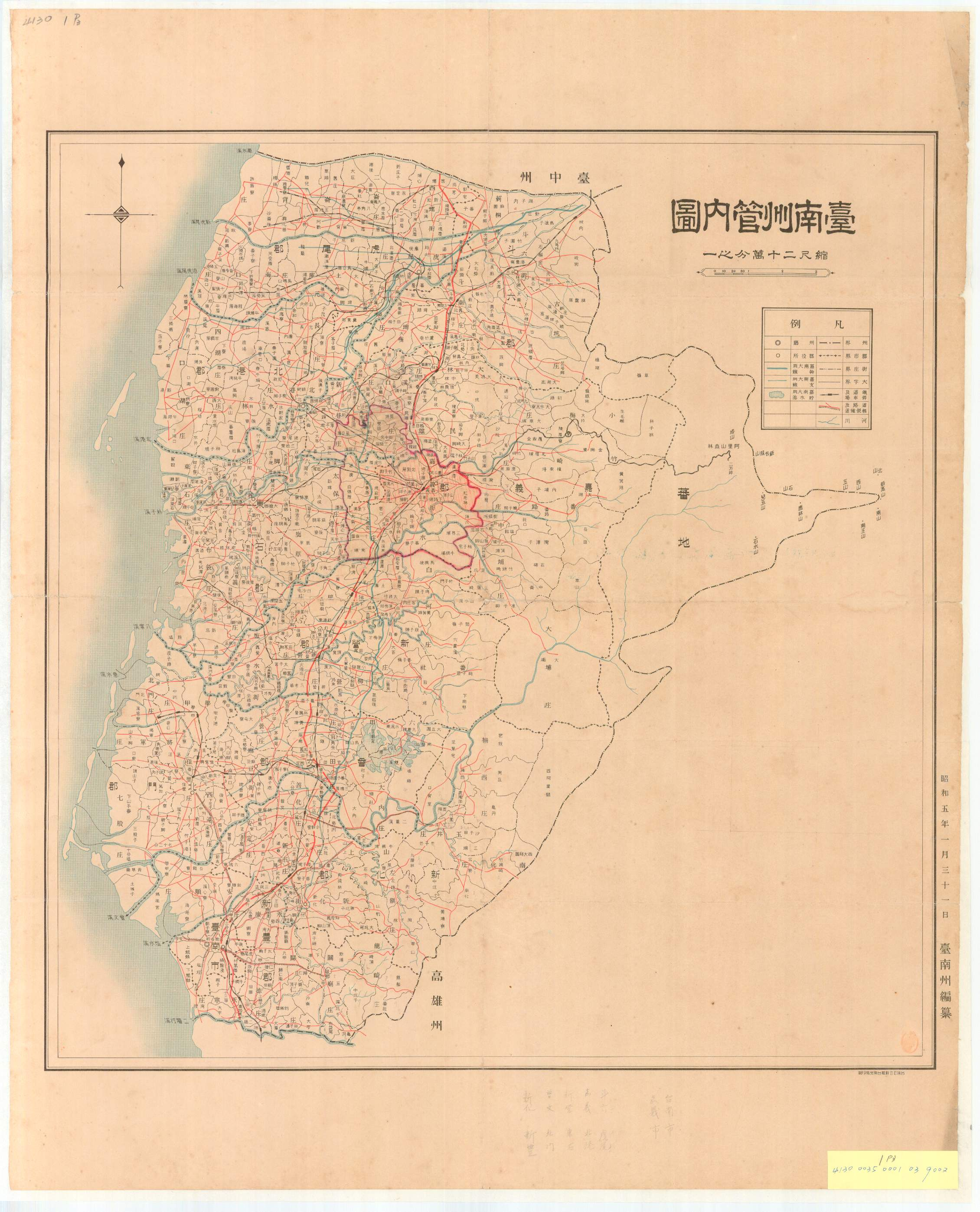
Tainan Prefecture

Tainan Prefecture (臺南州/台南州, Tainan-shū) was one of the administrative divisions of Taiwan during the Japanese rule. The prefecture consisted of modern-day Tainan City, Chiayi City, Chiayi County, and Yunlin County.

== Population ==
Total population	1,550,695
Japanese	53,446
Taiwanese	1,489,621
Korean	253
1941 (Showa 16) census.

== Administrative divisions ==
Administrative divisions of Tainan Prefecture (1930)

=== Cities and districts ===
In 1945 (Shōwa 20), there were 2 cities and 10 districts.

Cities (市 shi)			Districts (郡 gun)		
Name	Kanji	Kana	Name	Kanji	Kana
Tainan City	臺南市	たいなんし	Niitoyo District	新豐郡	にいとよぐん
Tainan City	臺南市	たいなんし	Shinka District	新化郡	しんかぐん
Tainan City	臺南市	たいなんし	Sobun District	曾文郡	そぶんぐん
Tainan City	臺南市	たいなんし	Hokumon District	北門郡	ほくもんぐん
Tainan City	臺南市	たいなんし	Shin'ei District	新營郡	しんえいぐん
Kagi City	嘉義市	かぎし	Kagi District	嘉義郡	かぎぐん
Kagi City	嘉義市	かぎし	Toroku District	斗六郡	とろくぐん
Kagi City	嘉義市	かぎし	Kobi District	虎尾郡	こびぐん
Kagi City	嘉義市	かぎし	Hokukō District	北港郡	ほくこうぐん
Kagi City	嘉義市	かぎし	Tōseki District	東石郡	とうせきぐん

=== Towns and Villages ===
The districts are further divided into towns (街) and villages (庄)

District	Name	Kanji	Notes
Niitoyo 新豐郡	Jintoku village	仁德庄	Today Rende District
Niitoyo 新豐郡	Kijin village	歸仁庄	Today Gueiren District
Niitoyo 新豐郡	Kanbyō village	關廟庄	Today Guanmiao District
Niitoyo 新豐郡	Tatsuzaki village	龍崎庄	Today Longci District
Niitoyo 新豐郡	Eikō village	永康庄	Today Yongkang District
Niitoyo 新豐郡	Anjun village	安順庄	Today Annan District
Niitoyo 新豐郡	Einei village	永寧庄	Abolished in 1940, annexed into Tainan City and Zintoku village
Shinka 新化郡	Shinka town	新化街	Today Sinhua District
Shinka 新化郡	Zenka town	善化街	Today Shanhua District
Shinka 新化郡	Shinshi village	新市庄	Today Sinshih District
Shinka 新化郡	Antei village	安定庄	Today Anding District
Shinka 新化郡	Yamakami village	山上庄	Today Shanshang District
Shinka 新化郡	Tamai village	玉井庄	Today Yujing District
Shinka 新化郡	Nansei village	楠西庄	Today Nansi District
Shinka 新化郡	Nanka village	南化庄	Today Nanhua District
Shinka 新化郡	Sachin village	左鎮庄	Today Zuojhen District
Sobun 曽文郡	Matō town	麻豆街	Today Madou District
Sobun 曽文郡	Kaei village	下營庄	Today Xiaying District
Sobun 曽文郡	Rokkō village	六甲庄	Today Liujia District
Sobun 曽文郡	Kanden village	官田庄	Today Guantian District
Sobun 曽文郡	Ōuchi village	大內庄	Today Danei District
Hokumon 北門郡	Kari town	佳里街	Today Jiali District
Hokumon 北門郡	Seikō village	西港庄	Today Sigang District
Hokumon 北門郡	Shichiko village	七股庄	Today Cigu District
Hokumon 北門郡	Shōgun village	將軍庄	Today Jiangjun District
Hokumon 北門郡	Hokumon village	北門庄	Today Beimen District
Hokumon 北門郡	Gakkō village	學甲庄	Today Syuejia District
Shin'ei 新營郡	Shin'ei town	新營街	Today Xinying District
Shin'ei 新營郡	Ensui town	鹽水街	Today Yanshuei District
Shin'ei 新營郡	Shirakawa village	白河庄	Today Baihe District
Shin'ei 新營郡	Ryūei village	柳營庄	Today Liouying District
Shin'ei 新營郡	Kōheki village	後壁庄	Today Houbi District
Shin'ei 新營郡	Bansha village	番社庄	Today Dongshan District
Kagi 嘉義郡	Tairin town	大林街	Today Dalin Township
Kagi 嘉義郡	Mizukami village	水上庄	Today Shuishang Township
Kagi 嘉義郡	Tamio village	民雄庄	Today Minxiong Township
Kagi 嘉義郡	Shinkō village	新巷庄	Today Xingang Township
Kagi 嘉義郡	Keikō village	渓口庄	Today Xikou Township
Kagi 嘉義郡	Kōme village	小梅庄	Today Meishan Township
Kagi 嘉義郡	Takesaki village	竹崎庄	Today Zhuqi Township
Kagi 嘉義郡	Banro village	番路庄	Today Fanlu Township
Kagi 嘉義郡	Chūho village	中埔庄	Today Zhongpu Township
Kagi 嘉義郡	Taiho village	大埔庄	Today Dapu Township
Kagi 嘉義郡	Aboriginal Area	蕃地	Today Alishan Township
Kagi 嘉義郡	Kagi town	嘉義街	Upgraded to a city in 1930, today Chiayi City
Toroku 斗六郡	Toroku town	斗六街	Today Douliu City and Linnei Township
Toroku 斗六郡	Tonan town	斗南街	Today Dounan Township
Toroku 斗六郡	Kokō village	古坑庄	Today Gukeng Township
Toroku 斗六郡	Taihi village	大埤庄	Today Dapi Township
Toroku 斗六郡	Shidō village	莿桐庄	Today Cihtong Township
Kobi 虎尾郡	Kobi town	虎尾街	Today Huwei Township
Kobi 虎尾郡	Seira town	西螺街	Today Xiluo Township
Kobi 虎尾郡	Doko town	土庫街	Today Tuku Township and Baozhong Township
Kobi 虎尾郡	Jirin village	二崙庄	Today Dapi Township
Kobi 虎尾郡	Ronbai village	崙背庄	Today Lunbei Township and Mailiao Township
Kobi 虎尾郡	Kaikō village	海口庄	Today Taixi Township and Dongshi Township
Hokkō 北港郡	Hokkō town	北港街	Today Beigang Township
Hokkō 北港郡	Kanchō village	元長庄	Today Yuanchang Township
Hokkō 北港郡	Shiko village	四湖庄	Today Sihu Township
Hokkō 北港郡	Kōko village	口湖庄	Today Kouhu Township
Hokkō 北港郡	Suirin village	水林庄	Today Shuilin Township
Tōseki 東石郡	Bokushi town	朴子街	Today Puzi City
Tōseki 東石郡	Rokkyaku village	六脚庄	Today Lioujiao Township
Tōseki 東石郡	Tōseki village	東石庄	Today Dongshi Township
Tōseki 東石郡	Hotei village	布袋庄	Today Budai Township
Tōseki 東石郡	Rokusō village	鹿草庄	Today Lucao Township
Tōseki 東石郡	Taihō village	太保庄	Today Taibao City
Tōseki 東石郡	Gichiku village	義竹庄	Today Yizhu Township

== See also ==
- Political divisions of Taiwan (1895–1945)
- Governor-General of Taiwan
- Taiwan under Japanese rule
- Administrative divisions of Taiwan
- Tainan Prefecture (Qing dynasty)
- Old Tainan Magistrate Residence
