= Provincial Highway 78 (Taiwan) =

Road in Taiwan

Provincial Highway 78
- 台78線
- 台西古坑線 (Taixi-Gukeng Expressway)

Route information
- Maintained by Directorate General of Highways
- Length: 42.879 km (26.644 mi)
- Existed: 6 February 2002–present

Major junctions
- West end: Prov 61 in Taixi, Yunlin
- Nat 1 in Dounan, Yunlin
- East end: Nat 3 in Gukeng, Yunlin

Location
- Country: Taiwan

Highway system
- Highway system in Taiwan
← Prov 76	→ Prov 82

Provincial Highway 78

Provincial Highway 78 (Chinese: 台78線) begins in Taixi, Yunlin, Taiwan, on Zhonghua Road (Provincial Highway No. 17) and ends in Gukeng, Yunlin on National Highway No. 3.

== Length ==
The total length is 42.879 km.

== Exit List ==
The entire route is within Yunlin County.

City	Location	km	Mile	Exit	Name	Destinations	Notes
Yunlin County	Taixi	0	0.0	0	Taixi System	Prov 61 – Kouhu, Taixi	
Yunlin County	Taixi	1	0.62	1	Taixi	Prov 17 – Sihu, Taixi	
Yunlin County	Dongshi	8.2	5.1	8	Dongshi	Cty 153 – Dongshi, Mailiao	
Yunlin County	Yuanchang	15.1	9.4	15	Yuanchang	Prov 19 – Yuanchang, Baozhong	
Yunlin County	Tuku	22	14	22	Tuku	Tuku	
Yunlin County	Huwei	25.4	15.8	25	Huwei	Cty 145 – Huwei, Tuku	
Yunlin County	Dounan	30.4	18.9	30	Yunlin System	Nat 1 – Dounan, Dalin	
Yunlin County	Dounan	32.6	20.3	32	Dounan	Prov 1 – Dounan, Dapi	
Yunlin County	Gukeng	39.4	24.5	39	Gukeng	Prov 3 – Douliu, Gukeng	
Yunlin County	Gukeng	42.879	26.644	43	Gukeng System	Nat 3 – Linnei, Meishan	
1.000 mi = 1.609 km; 1.000 km = 0.621 mi: Incomplete access

== Major Cities Along the Route ==
- Douliu City

== Intersections with other Freeways and Expressways ==
- National Highway No. 1 at Yunlin JCT. in Dapi, Yunlin
- National Highway No. 3 at Gukeng JCT. in Gukeng, Yunlin
- Provincial Highway No. 61 at Taixi IC. in Taixi, Yunlin

== See also ==
- Highway system in Taiwan

== Notes ==
- Completed in December 2004.
