= Jinluen River =

River in Taitung County, Taiwan

Physical characteristics
- Source: Yiding Mountain
- Mouth: Pacific Ocean
- Length: 26.40 kilometers

The Jinluen River is a river in Taitung County, Taiwan. It passes through Taimali and Jinfeng Townships.

== Tributaries ==
The Jinluen River has two major tributaries: the Balao and Dulaolaoen Rivers.

== See also ==
- List of rivers in Taiwan
