= 市 =

市 is a character for "city" in Chinese, Japanese, and Korean Hanja.

- List of cities in China
- List of cities in Taiwan
- List of cities in Japan
- List of cities in North Korea
- List of cities in South Korea
- List of cities in Malaysia

== See also ==
- Chinese characters
