= Zhutang =

Zhutang may refer to the following places in mainland China or Taiwan:

- Zhutang, Jiangyin (祝塘镇), town in Jiangyin City, Jiangsu
- Zhutang, Changhua (竹塘鄉), township of Changhua County, Taiwan
