= Taixi, Yunlin =

Rural township in Yunlin, Taiwan

Coordinates: 23°42′N 120°12′E

Taixi Township 臺西鄕
- Rural township
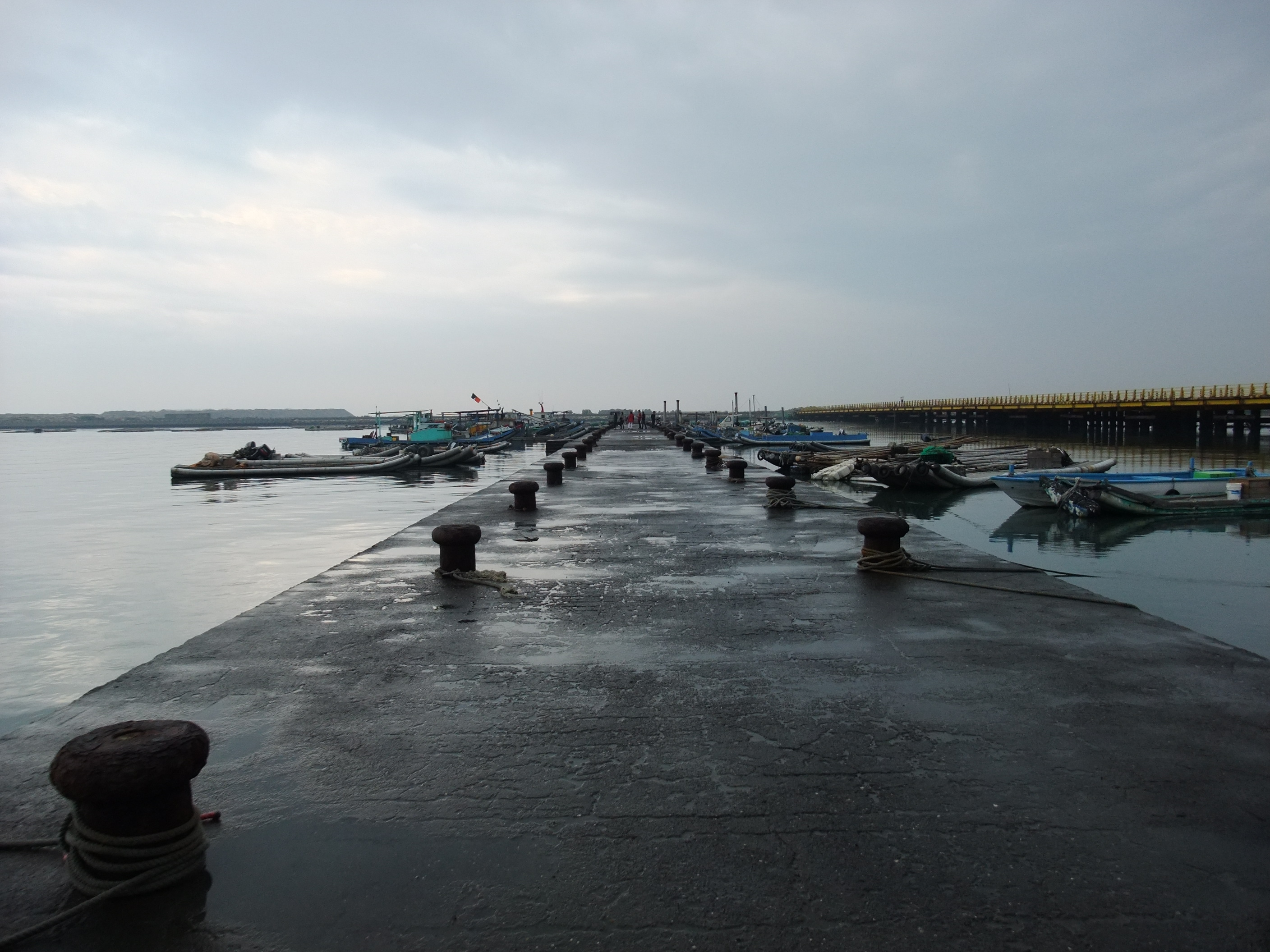
- Fishing harbor in Taixi Township

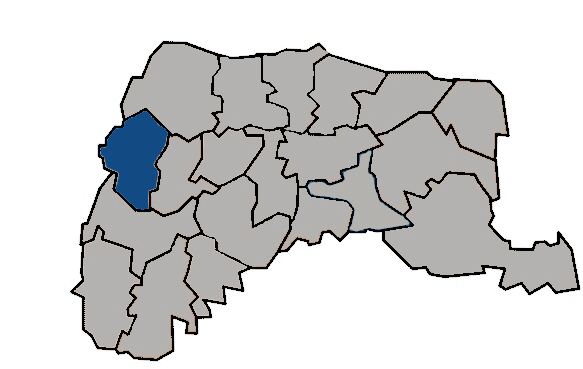
- Taixi Township in Yunlin County
- Location: Yunlin County, Taiwan

Area
  - Total: 54 km^{2} (21 sq mi)

Population (February 2023)
  - Total: 22,077
  - Density: 410/km^{2} (1,100/sq mi)
- Website: www.taihsi.gov.tw

Taixi Township (Chinese: 臺西鄕; Hanyu Pinyin: Táixī Xiāng; Tongyong Pinyin: Táisi Siang; Wade–Giles: T'ai^{2}-hsi^{1} Hsiang^{1}), is a rural township in Yunlin County, Taiwan, lying to the west of Dongshi, south of Mailiao and north of Sihu, and including a section of coastline on the Taiwan Strait.

== History ==
The town was formerly called Haikou (Chinese: 海口, meaning "seaport" or "river mouth"), a direct toponym describing the town's location at the end of the Huwei River where the river empties into the ocean. In 1941, the town was renamed Taixi. The reason for this name change was due to a perceived national shortcoming: in Taiwan, there existed four cities called Taipei (Chinese: 臺北, literally "Taiwan-North"), Taichung (Chinese: 臺中, "Taiwan-Middle"), Taitung (Chinese: 臺東, "Taiwan-East"), and Tainan (Chinese: 臺南, "Taiwan-South"), but there was no place called Taixi (Chinese: 臺西, "Taiwan-West"). To fill this gap in Taiwan's place naming system, the town, which is located at the approximate middle of Taiwan's west coast, was renamed Taixi.

Taixi was first settled by Han Chinese in the Kangxi era of the Qing Dynasty and gradually flourished through the reigns of the Yongzheng Emperor and the Qianlong Emperor. Families from Zhangzhou and Quanzhou with the typical Fukienese surnames Chen (Chinese: 陳), Chang (Chinese: 張), Wu (Chinese: 吳), Lin (Chinese: 林), and Ting (Chinese: 丁) cultivated the land and built a port. The port brought great prosperity to the town, and by the reign of the Qianlong Emperor, the town was thriving. Unfortunately, in 1898 a powerful storm hit the area, bringing floods and torrential rain which washed debris and silt from the nearby mountains down to the mouth of the river and the port. Almost overnight, the port was silted up, and Taixi was reduced to the small and relatively impoverished town that it is today.

Taixi's coastal waters were traditionally used in oyster farming, but in 1991 they were zoned for offshore industrial use.

== Demographics ==
As of February 2023, Taixi had 8,420 households and a total population of 22,077, including 10,267 females and 11,810 males.

== Administrative divisions ==
The township comprises 15 villages: Fuqi, Guanghua, Haibei, Haikou, Hainan, Hefeng, Niucuo, Quanzhou, Shanliao, Taixi, Wengang, Wugang, Wulang, Xiding and Yongfeng.

== Economy ==
The township produces radishes.

== Transport ==
- Provincial Highway 17
- Provincial Highway 61
- Provincial Highway 78
- County Highways 154, 155 and 158

== Places of interest ==
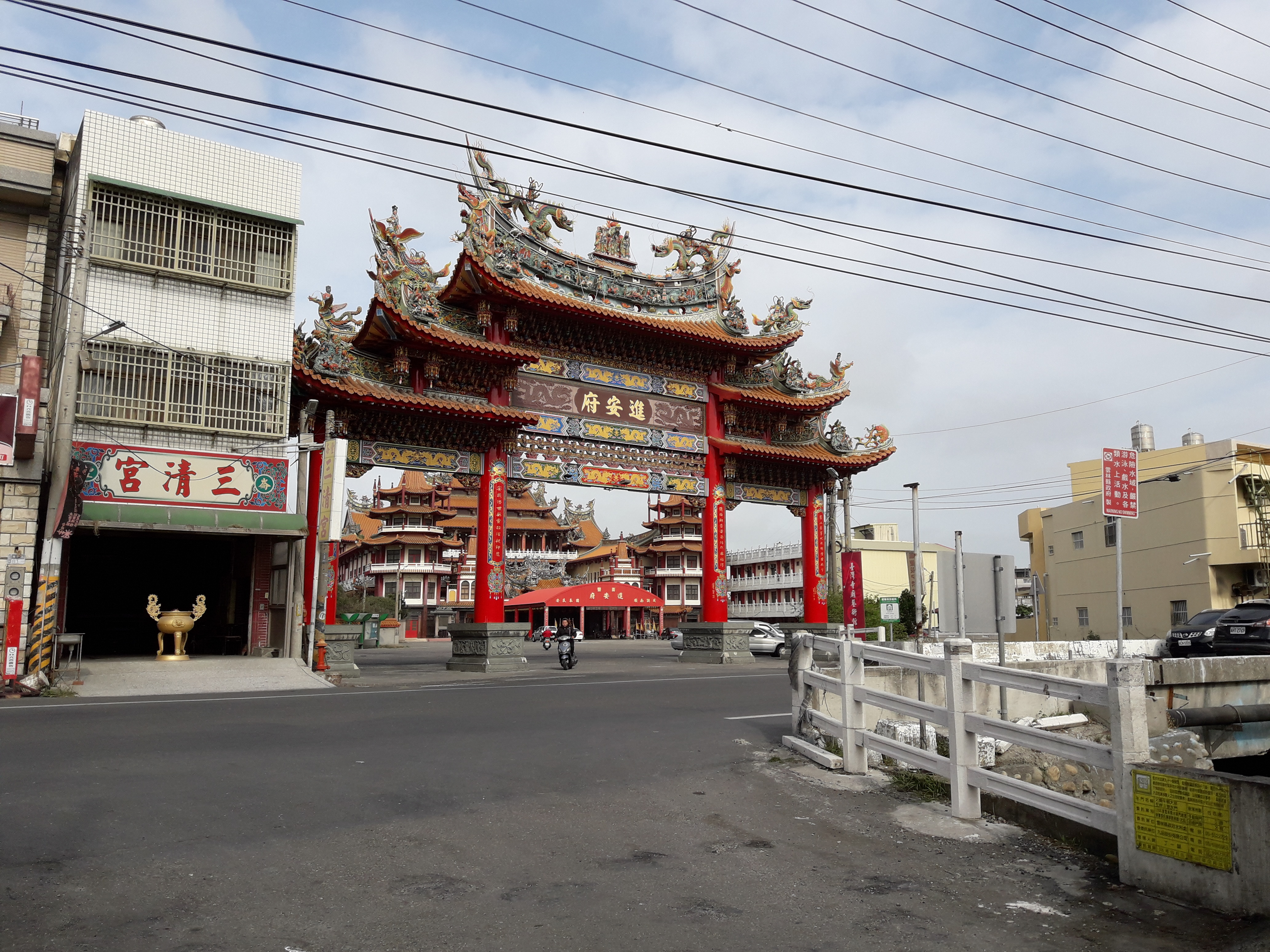
Gateway to Jin'an Temple in Taixi

- The Taixi Seaside Park built in 1992 by the Yunlin County Government covers 121 hectares and is a main contributor to the local economy. The park is primarily wetlands and is host to a variety of wildlife and flora including intertidal animals, such as fiddler crabs, mudskippers, woodlice, egrets, herons, and other migratory birds, and cacti, mangroves and others.

== Representation of Taixi in the media ==
In 1982, a novel was published telling the story of a young Taixi man who escaped prison and went on a killing spree in Taiwan. Although this was fiction, it had a large impact on the way other Taiwanese people perceive its villagers to this day.
