= Zhutang, Changhua =

Rural township in Changhua County, Taiwan

Coordinates: 23°51′10″N 120°24′41″E

Zhutang Township 竹塘鄉 Jhutang; Chutang
- Rural township
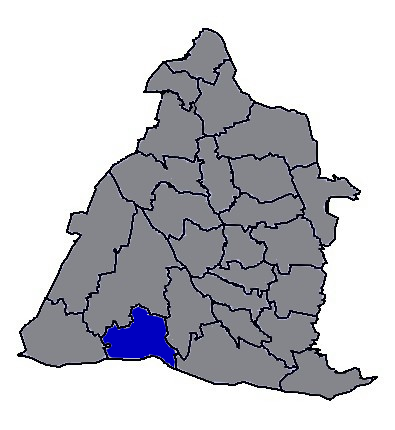

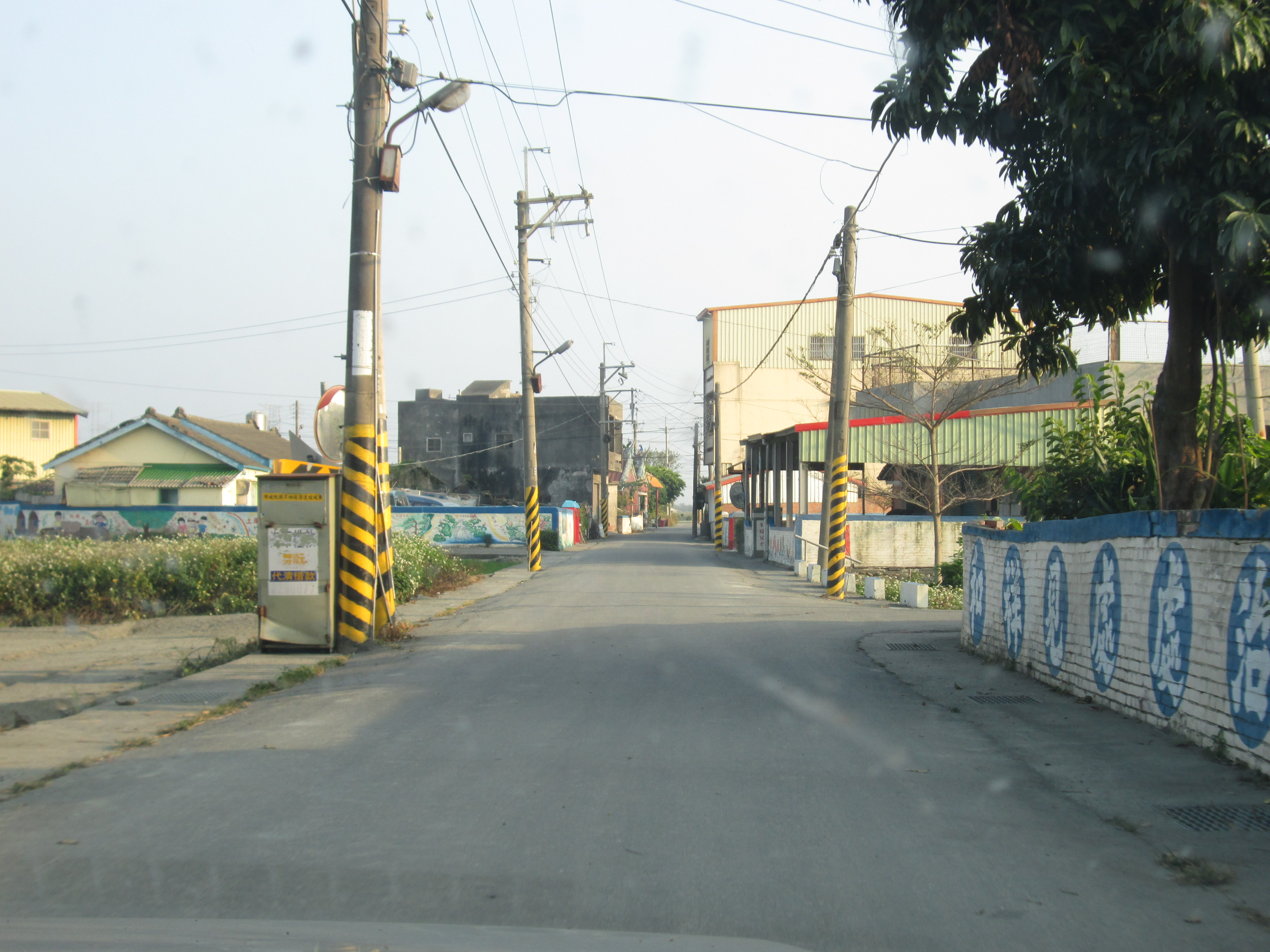
- Zhutang Township in Changhua County
- Location: Changhua County, Taiwan

Area
  - Total: 42 km^{2} (16 sq mi)

Population (March 2023)
  - Total: 14,343
  - Density: 340/km^{2} (880/sq mi)
- Website: town.chcg.gov.tw/chutang

Zhutang Township (Chinese: 竹塘鄉; pinyin: Zhútáng Xiāng) is a rural township in Changhua County, Taiwan. It has a population total of 14,353 and an area of 42.1662 square kilometres.

== Administrative divisions ==
- Zhuyuan Village
- Zhutang Village
- Xiaoxi Village
- Minjing Village
- Wuzhuang Village
- Shujiao Village
- Tiantou Village
- Xinguang Village
- Xiqi Village
- Zhulin Village
- Tuku Village
- Neixin Village
- Zhangan Village
- Yongan Village
