= Jinfeng, Taitung =

Mountain indigenous township in Taitung County, Taiwan

Coordinates: 22°36′N 120°58′E

Jinfeng Township 金峰鄉 Jinfong
- Mountain indigenous township
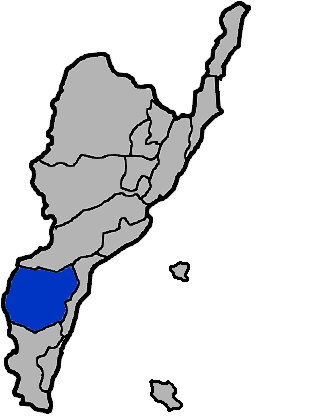
- Jinfeng Township in Taitung County
- Location: Taitung County, Taiwan

Area
  - Total: 381 km^{2} (147 sq mi)

Population (September 2023)
  - Total: 3,711
  - Density: 9.74/km^{2} (25.2/sq mi)

Jinfeng Township (Chinese: 金峰鄉; Hanyu Pinyin: Jīnfēng Xiāng; Tongyong Pinyin: Jinfong Siang) is a mountain indigenous township in Taitung County, Taiwan. The main population is the Paiwan people of the Taiwanese aborigines.

== Administrative divisions ==
- Jialan Village
- Zhengxing Village
- Xinxing Village
- Binmao Village
- Liqiu Village
