= Shuilin =

Rural township in Yunlin, Taiwan

Coordinates: 23.56619°N 120.233978°E

Shuilin Township 水林鄉
- Rural township
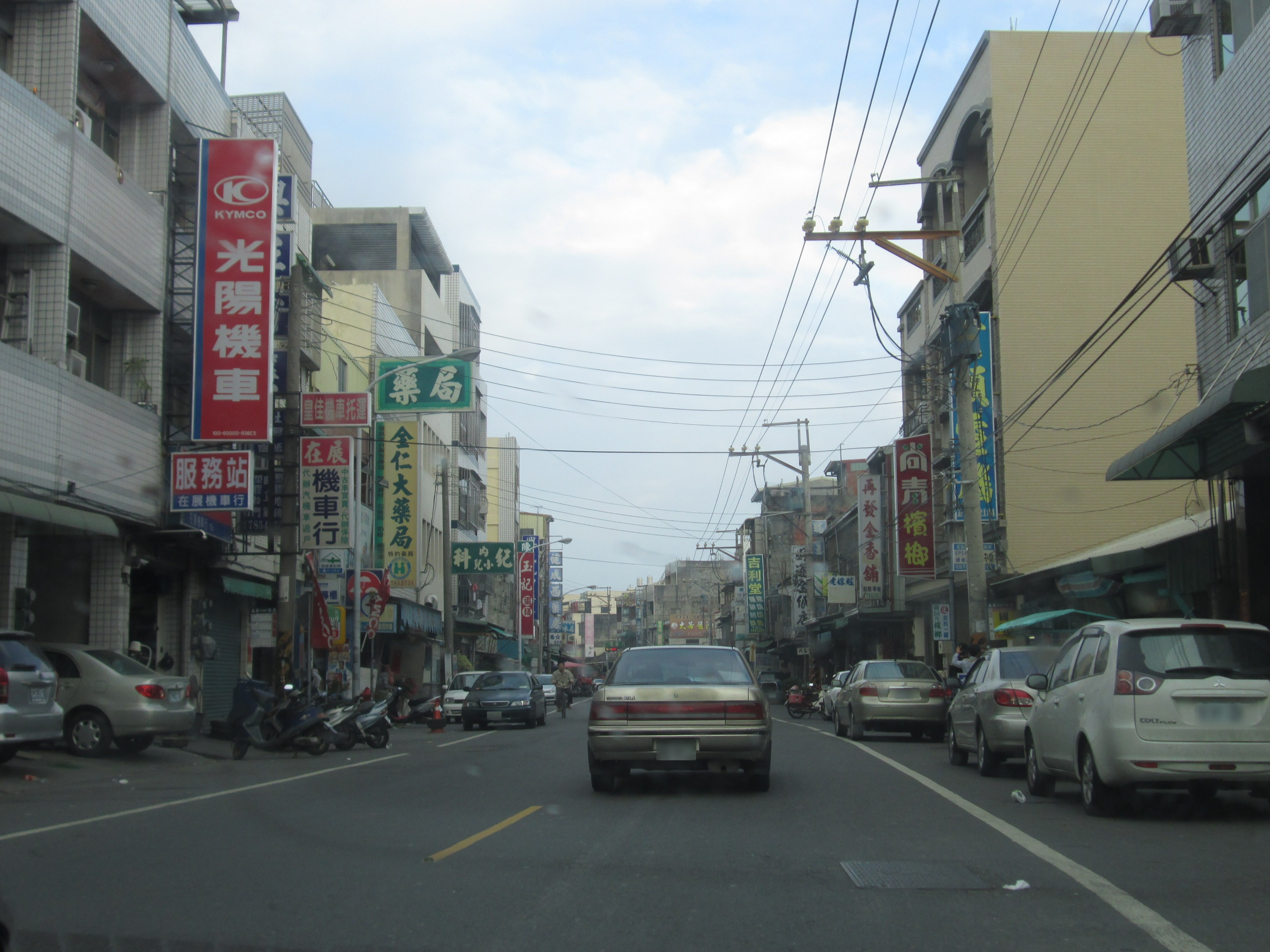

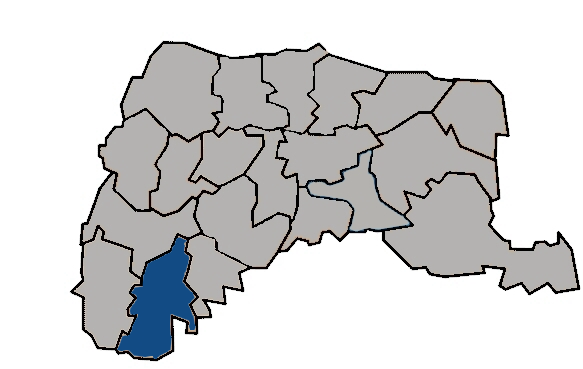
- Shuilin Township in Yunlin County
- Location: Yunlin County, Taiwan

Area
  - Total: 73 km^{2} (28 sq mi)

Population (February 2023)
  - Total: 23,134
  - Density: 320/km^{2} (820/sq mi)

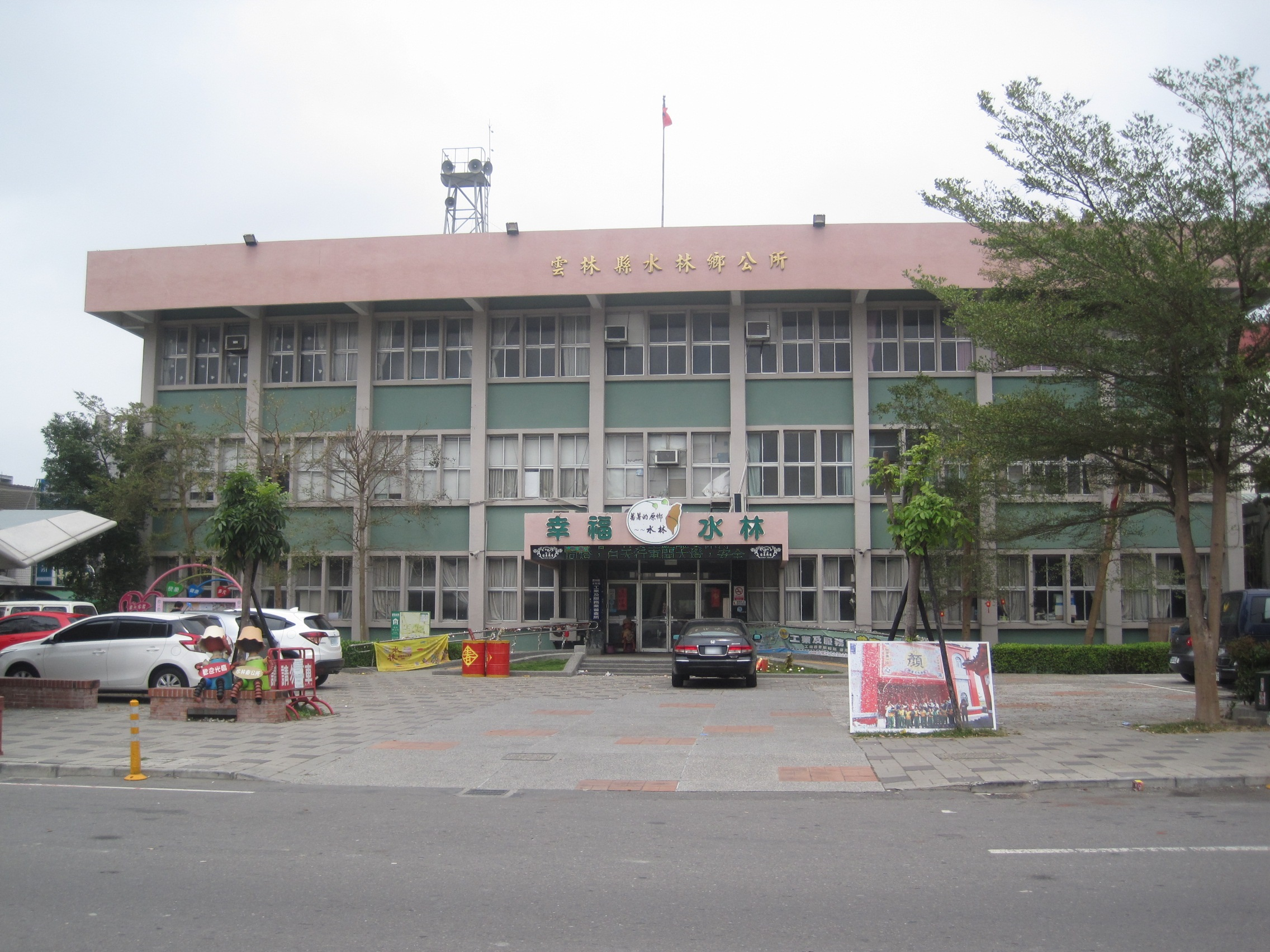
Shulin Township Office

Shuilin Township (Chinese: 水林鄉; pinyin: Shuǐlín Xiāng, Wade–Giles: Shueilin) is a rural township in Yunlin County, Taiwan.

Shuilin Township was originally known as 'Shuicanlin'. The earliest documented references to this name are both verifiable and historically significant. According to accounts, imperial ministers from the late Ming dynasty arrived in Taiwan from the east, where Gaoshan people had already settled, engaging in agriculture across the region. During the 22nd year reign of Emperor Kangxi in the Qing dynasty (1683), additional immigrants from Zhangzhou and Quanzhou in Fujian arrived, cultivating land and forming a settlement.

== History ==
Shuilin Township was originally affiliated with Zhuluo County (now Chiayi County) in the first year reign of Emperor Yongzheng. In the 14th year reign of Emperor Guangxu, Yunlin County was established, and the township was placed under its jurisdiction. Following the signing of the Treaty of Shimonoseki in the 32nd year of Guangxu's reign, Taiwan was ceded to Japan, and Shuilin remained under Japanese rule for 50 years. During this period, administrative reforms replaced counties with bureaus, placing Shuilin Township initially under Douliu City Hall and later under Chiayi City Hall.

In the 9th year of the Republic of China, local autonomy was introduced, and the township was reorganised into Beigang County within Tainan Prefecture. Concurrently, 'Shuicanlin' was renamed 'Shuilin Village,' and a village hall was established to oversee local administration.

In 1945, following the conclusion of the Second Sino-Japanese War and Taiwan's transfer to the Republic of China (Retrocession of Taiwan), Shuilin Township was placed under the jurisdiction of Tainan County, with 24 villages under its administration. On 25 October 1950, Taiwan's administrative divisions were reorganised, resulting in the separation of Tainan County into Tainan, Chiayi, and Yunlin Counties. As part of this restructuring, Shuilin Township was reassigned to Yunlin County.

== Geography ==
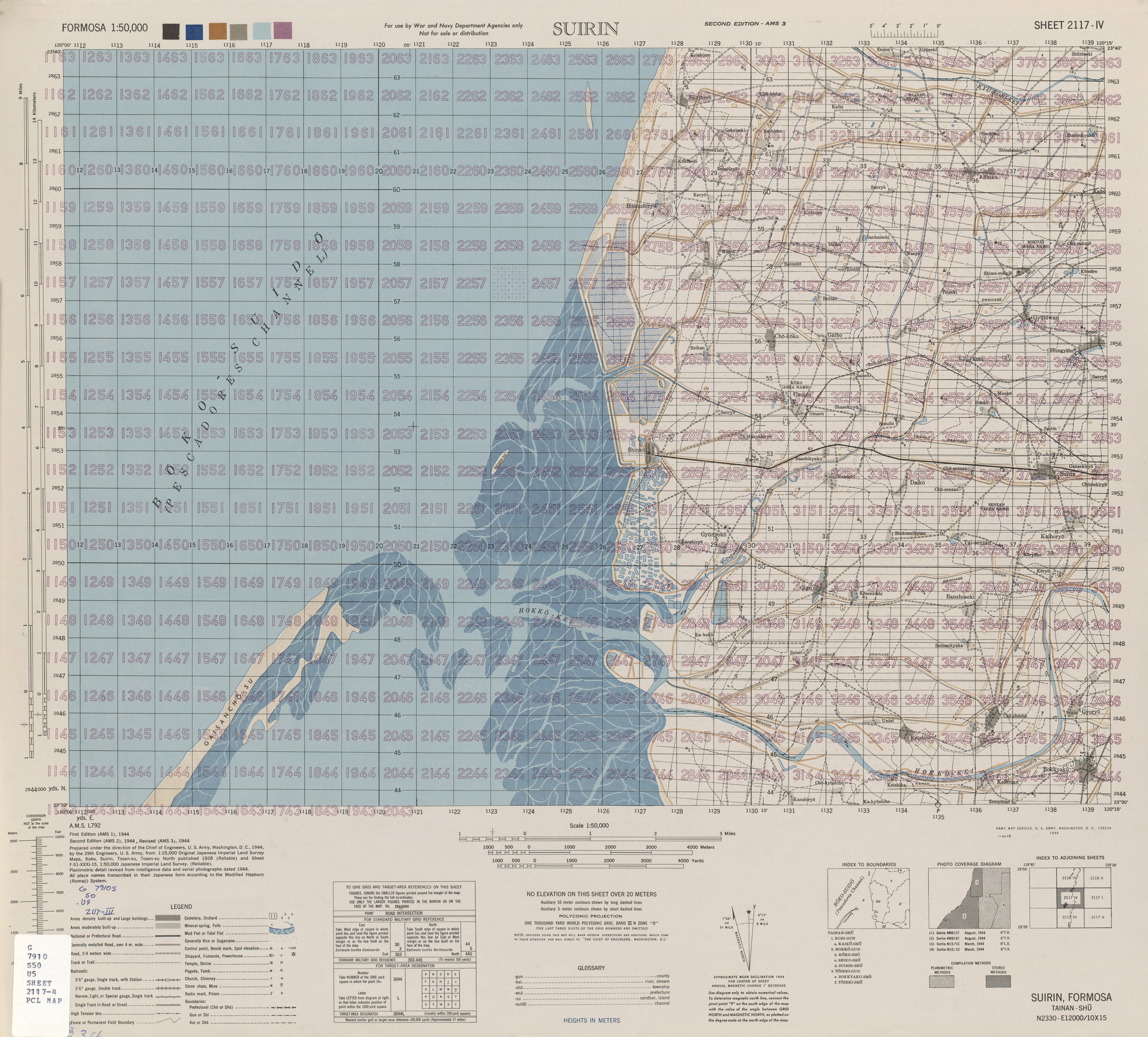
Map of Shuilin (labeled as Suirin) and surrounding area (1944)

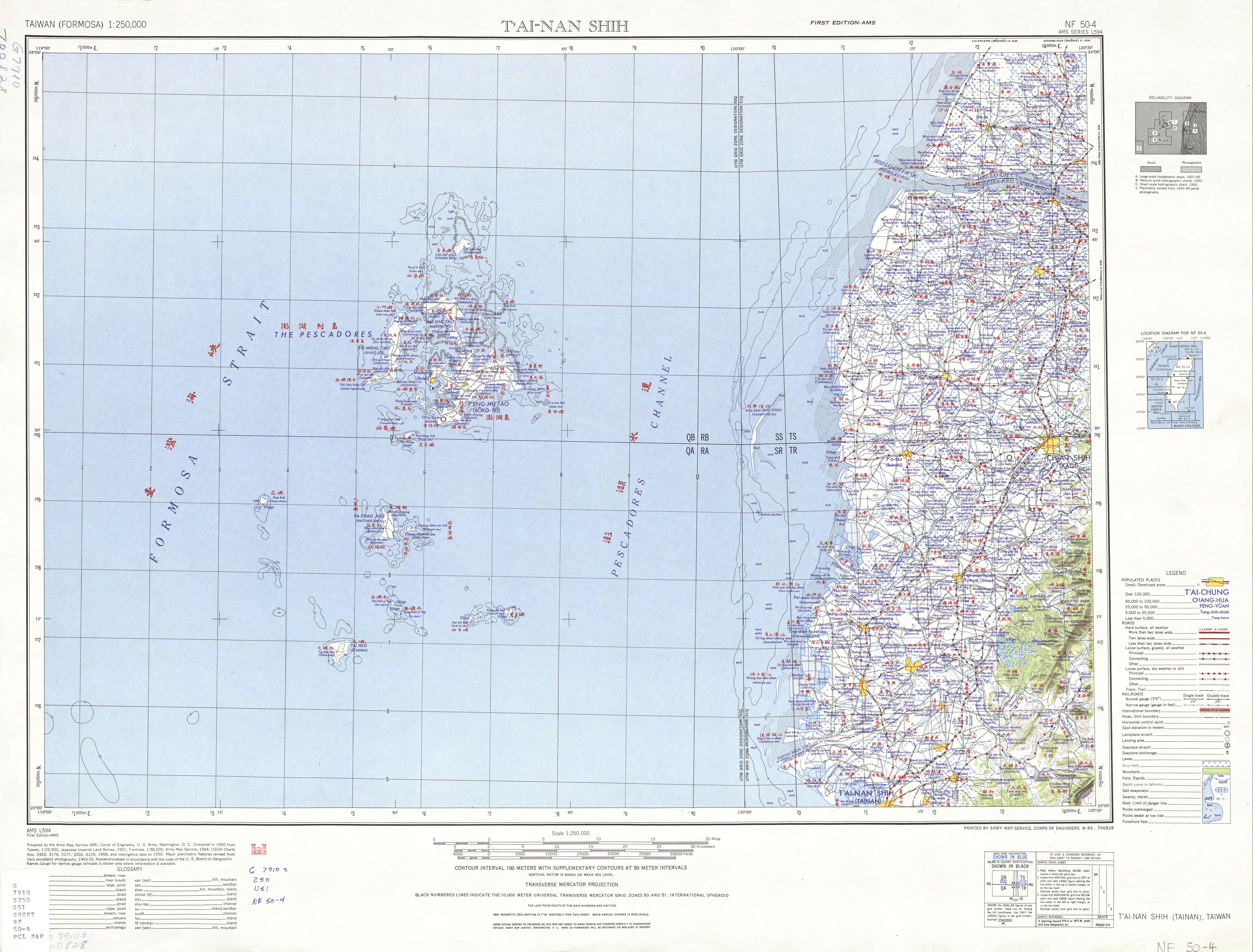
Map including Shuilin (labeled as Shui-lin (Suirin) 水林 (1950)

Shuilin Township has a total population of 23,134 and covers an area of 72.96 square kilometres.

== Administrative divisions ==
The township comprises 24 villages: Chunpu, Dagou, Dashan, Fanshu, Haipu, Houliao, Jianshan, Jiupu, Jugang, Shanjiao, Shuibei, Shuinan, Shunxing, Songbei, Songxi, Songzhong, Suqin, Tucuo, Wende, Wantung, Wanxi, Wanxing, Xijing and Xiqi.
