= Cihtong =

Rural township in Yunlin, Taiwan

Coordinates: 23.772935°N 120.527717°E

Cihtong Township 莿桐鄉 Citong
- Rural township
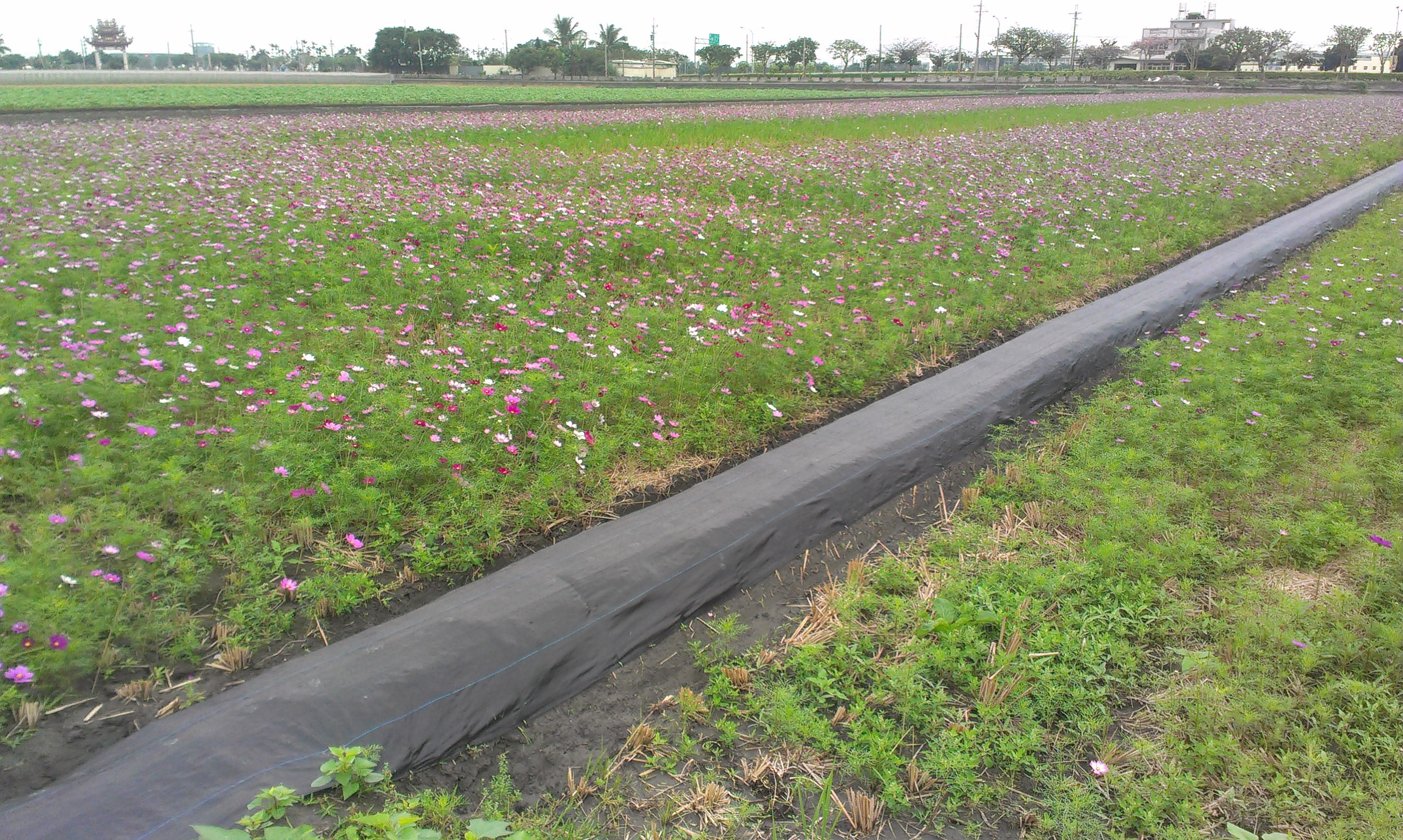
- Farm fields with cover crops in the winter in Cihtong

- 莿桐鄉 CIHTONG TOWNSHIP

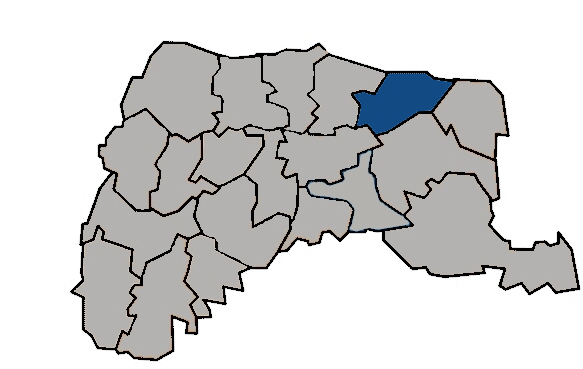
- Cihtong Township in Yunlin County
- Location: Yunlin County, Taiwan

Area
  - Total: 51 km^{2} (20 sq mi)

Population (February 2023)
  - Total: 27,538
  - Density: 540/km^{2} (1,400/sq mi)
- Website: www.cihtong.gov.tw/english/

Citong Township
- Chinese: 莿桐鄉
- Hanyu Pinyin: Cìtóng Xiāng
- Wade–Giles: Tz'u^{4}-t'ung^{2} Hsiang^{1}
- Tongyong Pinyin: Cìhtóng Siang
- Pha̍k-fa-sṳ: Tshṳ̀-thùng-hiông
- Hokkien POJ: Chhì-tông-hiong

Cihtong Township or Citong Township is a rural township in Yunlin County, Taiwan. It has a population total of 27,538 (as of February 2023) and an area of 50.8502 square kilometres.

== Name ==
Cihtong was named after Cihtong Lane (Chinese: 莿桐巷; Pe̍h-ōe-jī: Chhì-tông-hāng). Before the Qing Dynasty era, Erythrina flowers (Chinese: 刺桐; Hanyu Pinyin: cìtóng; Tongyong Pinyin: cìhtóng; Pe̍h-ōe-jī: chhì-tông) flourished in the then-unpopulated area. The first settlers chose a small lane there to establish a village, which had flowers spread throughout its length.

== Geography ==
=== Administrative divisions ===
The township comprises 14 villages: Citong, Damei, Gancuo, Ganxi, Liuge, Mayuan, Puwei, Puzi, Raoping, Sihe, Wuhua, Xinggui, Xingtong and Yihe.

== Economy ==
The township main economy is agriculture. It produces paddy rice mainly along the northern township border with Zhuoshui River in which the output is the highest in the county.
