= Baozhong, Yunlin =

Rural township in Yunlin, Taiwan

Coordinates: 23°41′44″N 120°18′42″E

Baozhong Township 褒忠鄉
- Rural township
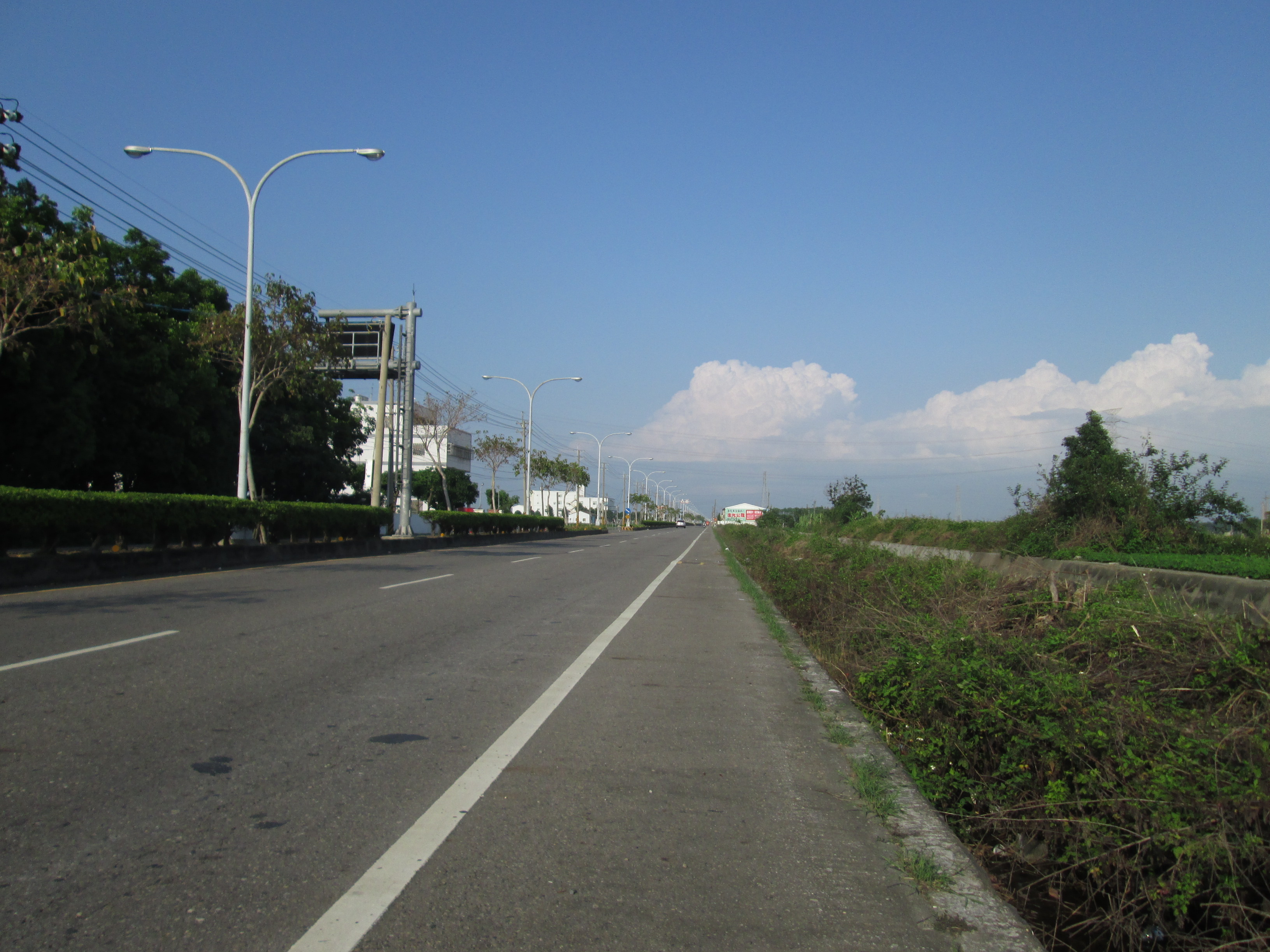

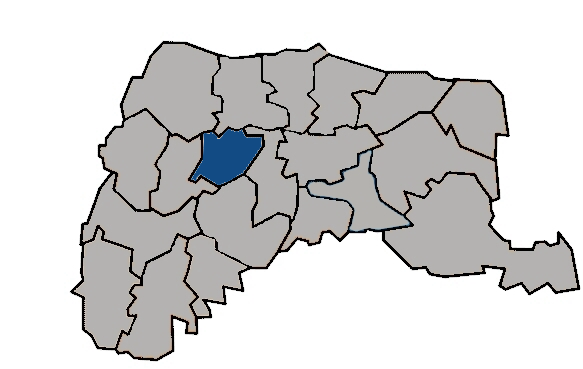
- Baozhong Township in Yunlin County
- Location: Yunlin County, Taiwan

Area
  - Total: 37 km^{2} (14 sq mi)

Population (February 2023)
  - Total: 12,086
  - Density: 330/km^{2} (850/sq mi)

Baozhong Township (Chinese: 褒忠鄉; pinyin: Bāozhōng Xiāng; Wade-Giles: Pao-Chung Hsiang) is a rural township in Yunlin County, Taiwan. It is the smallest township in Yunlin County.

== History ==
Baozhong Township was originally known as Pujianglung Village. During the Qing Dynasty rule, the township was under the jurisdiction of Changhua County and later changed under Yunlin County. During the Japanese rule, the township was placed under the jurisdiction of Pujianglung District, Tuku Subprefecture. Later, Baozhong Township was established to meet the needs of the local people. In 1950, the jurisdiction of the township was changed to the newly added Yunlin County.

== Administrative divisions ==
There is a total of nine villages in Baozhong:

- Zhongmin (中民村)
- Zhongsheng (中勝村)
- Tianyang (田洋村)
- Youcai (有才村)
- Pujiang (埔姜村)
- Maming (馬鳴村)
- Xinhu (新湖村)
- Chaocuo (潮厝村)
- Longyan (龍岩村)

== Demographics ==
According to the census conducted by the Huwei Household Registration Office (虎尾戶政事務所) in February 2023, there are currently about 12,086 people living in Baozhong, in which 53.53% of them are male and 46.47% of them are female. The population of the township has been decreasing every year since 1998. The number of households, however, has been gaining.

== Tourist attractions ==
- Mamingshan Chiang Kai-shek Memorial Park
- Mamingshan Jhen-an Temple

== Notable natives ==
- Chen Liang-gee, Minister of Science and Technology
- Shu Chin-chiang, Chairman of Taiwan Solidarity Union (2005-2006)
- Teresa Teng, former Taiwanese pop singer
