= Dapi, Yunlin =

Rural township in Yunlin, Taiwan

Coordinates: 23.649399°N 120.425407°E

Dapi Township 大埤鄉
- Rural township
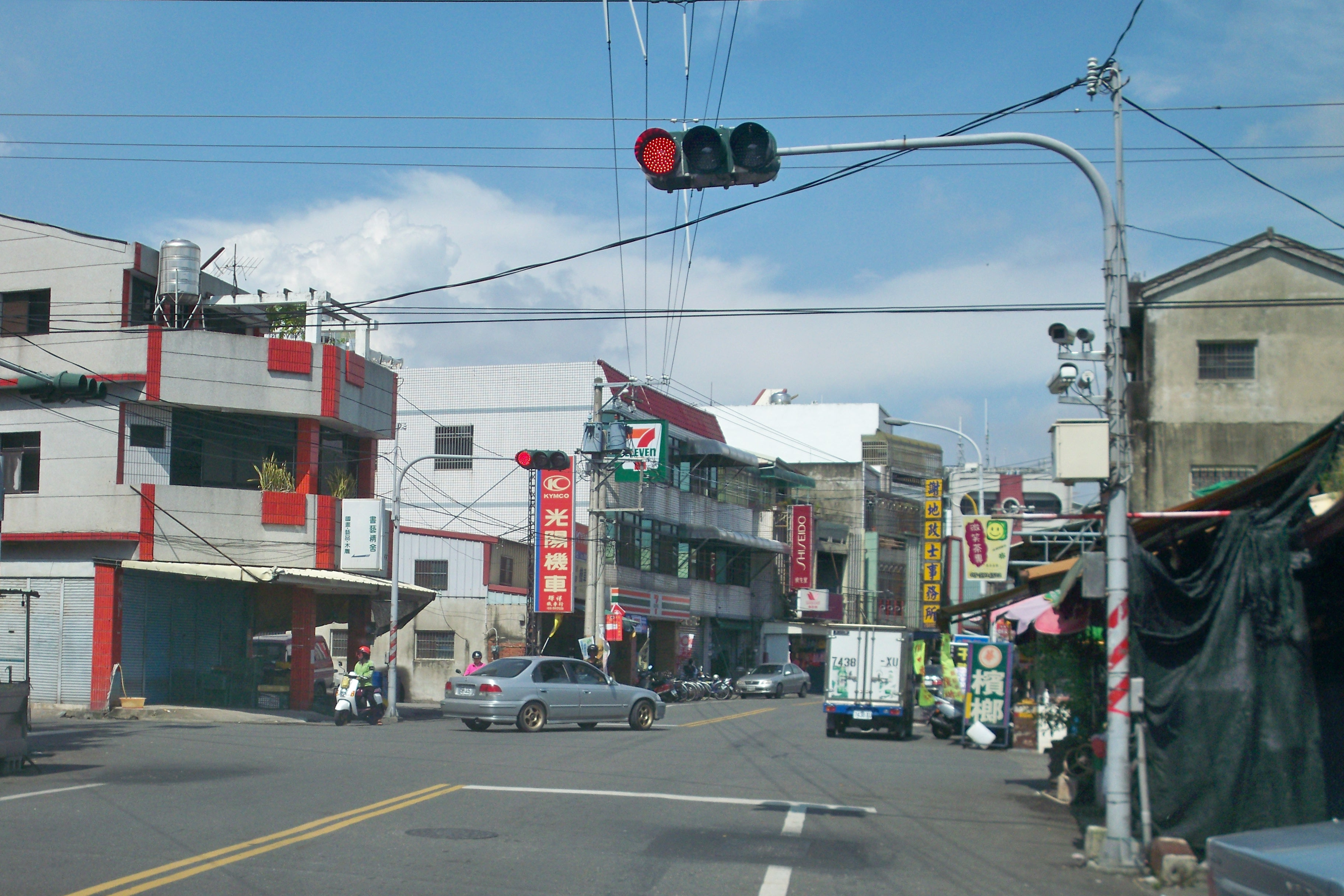

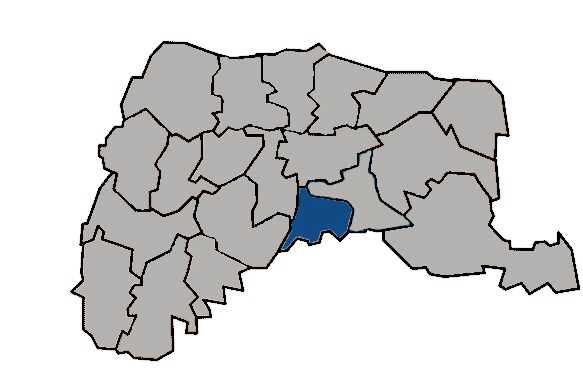
- Dapi Township in Yunlin County
- Location: Yunlin County, Taiwan

Area
  - Total: 45 km^{2} (17 sq mi)

Population (February 2023)
  - Total: 18,178
  - Density: 400/km^{2} (1,000/sq mi)
- Website: Official website

Dapi Township (Chinese: 大埤鄉; pinyin: Dàpí Xiāng) is a rural township in Yunlin County, Taiwan.

== Geography ==
It has a population total of 18,178 and an area of 44.9973 km^{2}.

== Administrative divisions ==
Dapi Township consists of 15 villages, which are Beihe, Beizeng, Dade, Fenggang, Fengtian, Jiaxing, Jitian, Lianmei, Nanhe, Sanjie, Shangyi, Songzhu, Xingan, Xizeng and Yiran.

== Economy ==
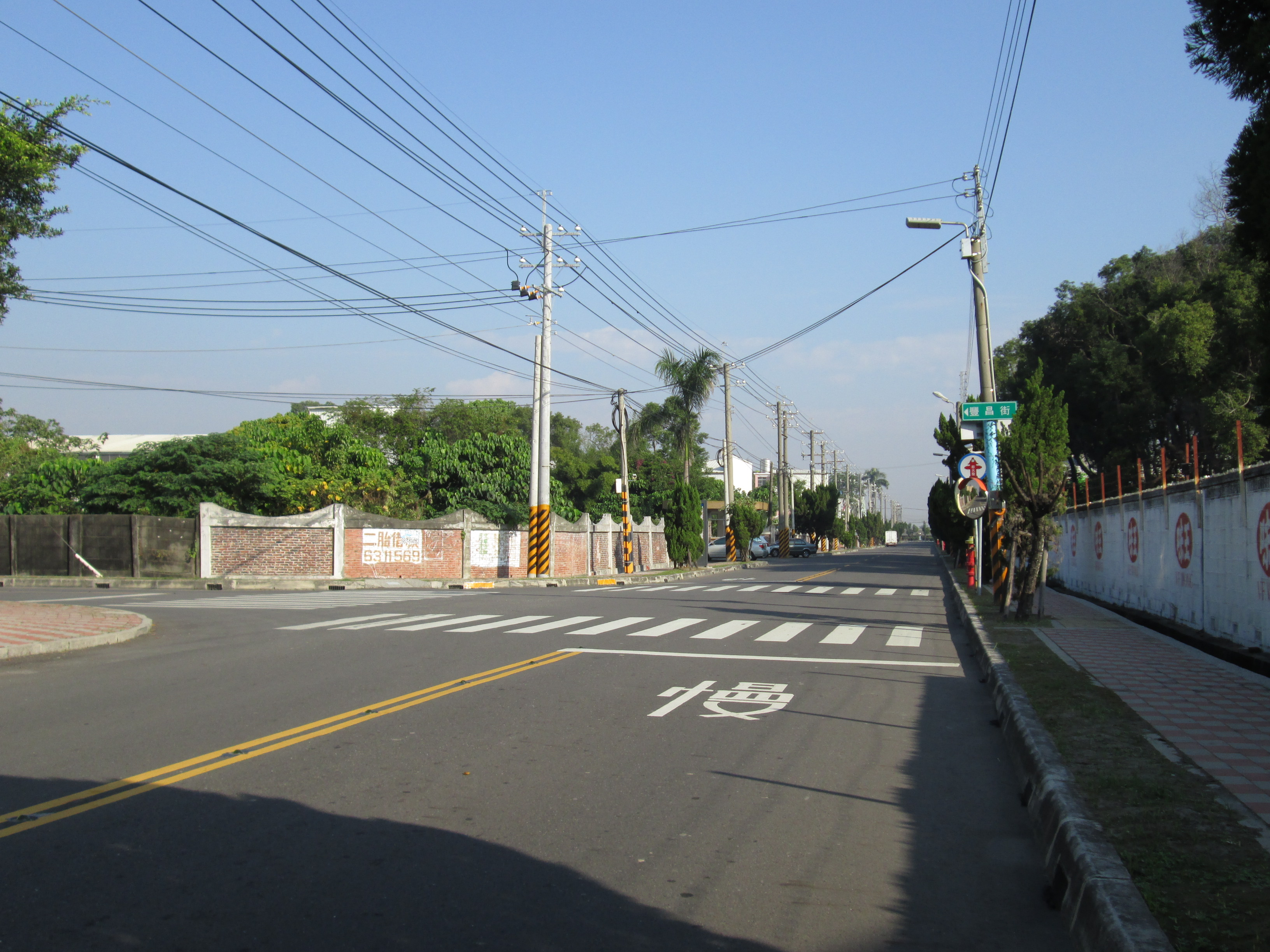
Fengtian Industry Park

Dapi is an agricultural town where the major crops are rice, bamboo shoots, leaf mustard and flowers. It also has livestock husbandry, such as pigs, lambs, chickens, ducks and deer, as well as aquatic animals such as soft-shell turtles and fishes. The township supplies 85% of pickled mustard demand in Taiwan.
