= Yuanchang =

Rural township in Yunlin, Taiwan

Coordinates: 23.642008°N 120.322899°E

Yuanchang Township 元長鄉
- Rural township
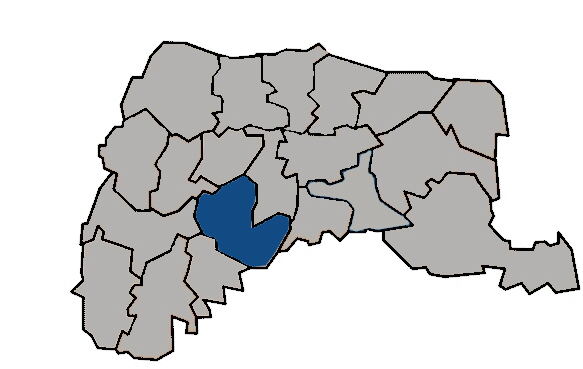
- Yuanchang Township in Yunlin County
- Location: Yunlin County, Taiwan

Area
  - Total: 72 km^{2} (28 sq mi)

Population (February 2023)
  - Total: 23,656
  - Density: 330/km^{2} (850/sq mi)

Yuanchang Township
- Chinese: 元長鄉
- Hanyu Pinyin: Yuánzhǎng Xiāng
- Wade–Giles: Yüan^{2}-chang^{3} Hsiang^{1}
- Pha̍k-fa-sṳ: Ngièn-tshòng-hiông
- Hokkien POJ: Goân-chióng-hiong

Yuanchang Township is a rural township in Yunlin County, Taiwan.

== Name ==
The local Fu clan maintains the name Yuanchang comes from Fu Yuan-chang (傅元掌), their ancestor who settled in the area in 1741. The Yunlin government agrees such a person did exist, but whether the specific man is the progenitor of the township's name is unclear.

== Geography ==
It has a population total of 23,656 and an area of 71.59 square kilometres (27.64 sq mi)

== Administrative divisions ==
Zhangnan, Zhangbei, Zimao, Houhu, Shannei, Gehe, Wukuai, Tanxi, Tantung, Kecuo, Zhuoyun, Dingliao, Xialiao, Longyan, Xizhuang, Lubei, Lunan, Wayao, Neiliao, Lunzi and Xinji Village.

== Tourist attractions ==
- Ao Feng Kung
- Cooperation Irrigation Project
- San-nei Lee House
- Mr. Fu Graveyard
- Tasi Graveyard
- Hou-Jiang-Yen Denomination

== Notable natives ==
- Jacklyn Wu, actress and singer
- Tsai Pi-chung, acting Magistrate of Hualien County (2018)
- Lin Zhu-an (林竹岸, b. 1936), Taiwanese opera musician
