= Dongshi, Yunlin =

Rural township in Yunlin, Taiwan

Coordinates: 23°42′7.4″N 120°15′20.1″E

Township 東勢鄉
- Rural township
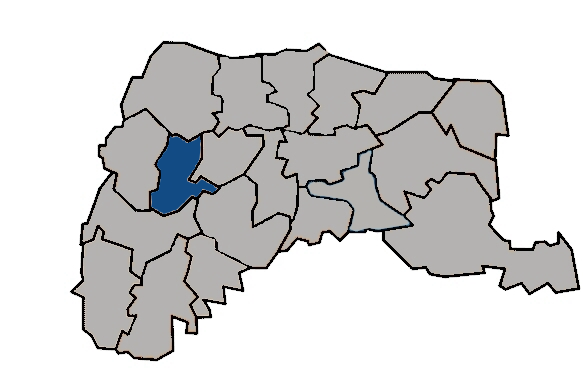
- Dongshi Township in Yunlin County
- Location: Yunlin County, Taiwan

Area
  - Total: 48 km^{2} (19 sq mi)

Population (February 2023)
  - Total: 13,601
  - Density: 280/km^{2} (730/sq mi)

Dongshi Township (Chinese: 東勢鄉; Hanyu Pinyin: Dōngshì Xiāng; Tongyong Pinyin: Dongshìh Siang; Wade–Giles: Tung^{1}-shih^{4} Hsiang^{1}), also spelled Dongshih Township, is a rural township in Yunlin County, Taiwan.

== Geography ==
It has a population total of 13,601 and an area of 48.3562 square kilometers.

== Economy ==
The township produces chicken from its farms. It also produces radishes.

== Administrative divisions ==
Yuemei, Fuxing, Jialong, Tungnan, Tungbei, Longtan, Chenghai, Changnan, Annan, Tongan, Simei and Xinkun Village.
