= Sihu, Yunlin =

Rural township in Yunlin, Taiwan

Coordinates: 23.641065°N 120.201019°E

Sihu Township 四湖鄉
- Rural township
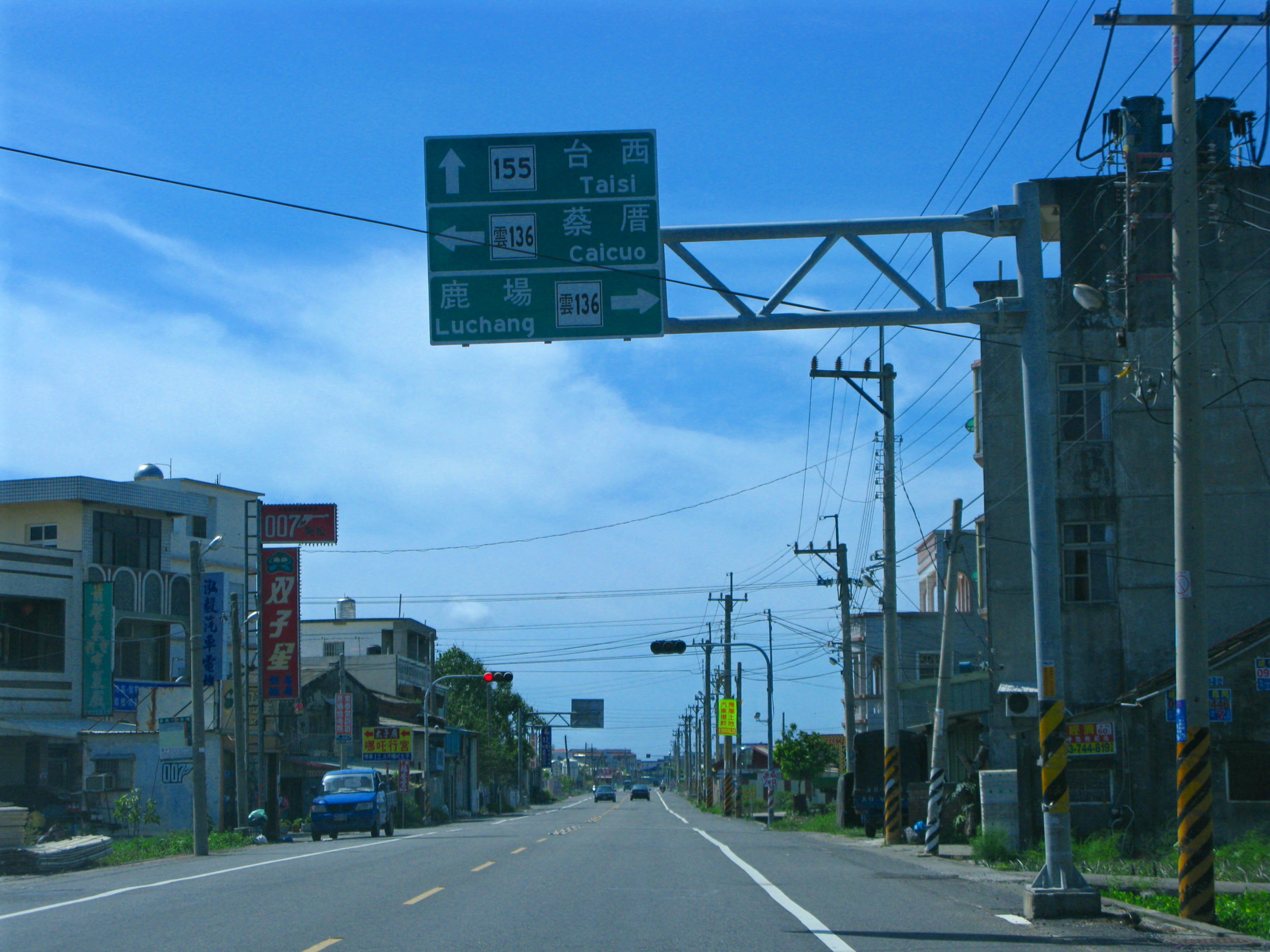

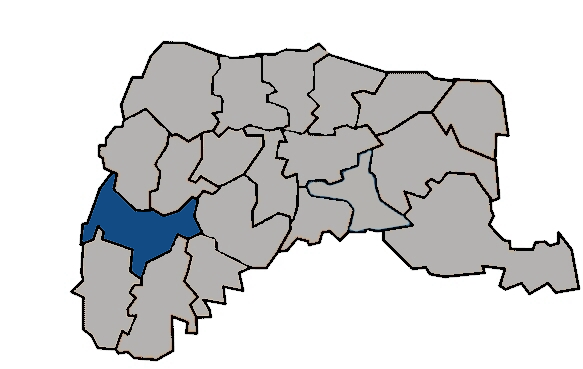
- Sihu Township in Yunlin County
- Location: Yunlin County, Taiwan

Area
  - Total: 77 km^{2} (30 sq mi)

Population (February 2023)
  - Total: 21,458
  - Density: 280/km^{2} (720/sq mi)
- Website: www.zuhu.gov.tw

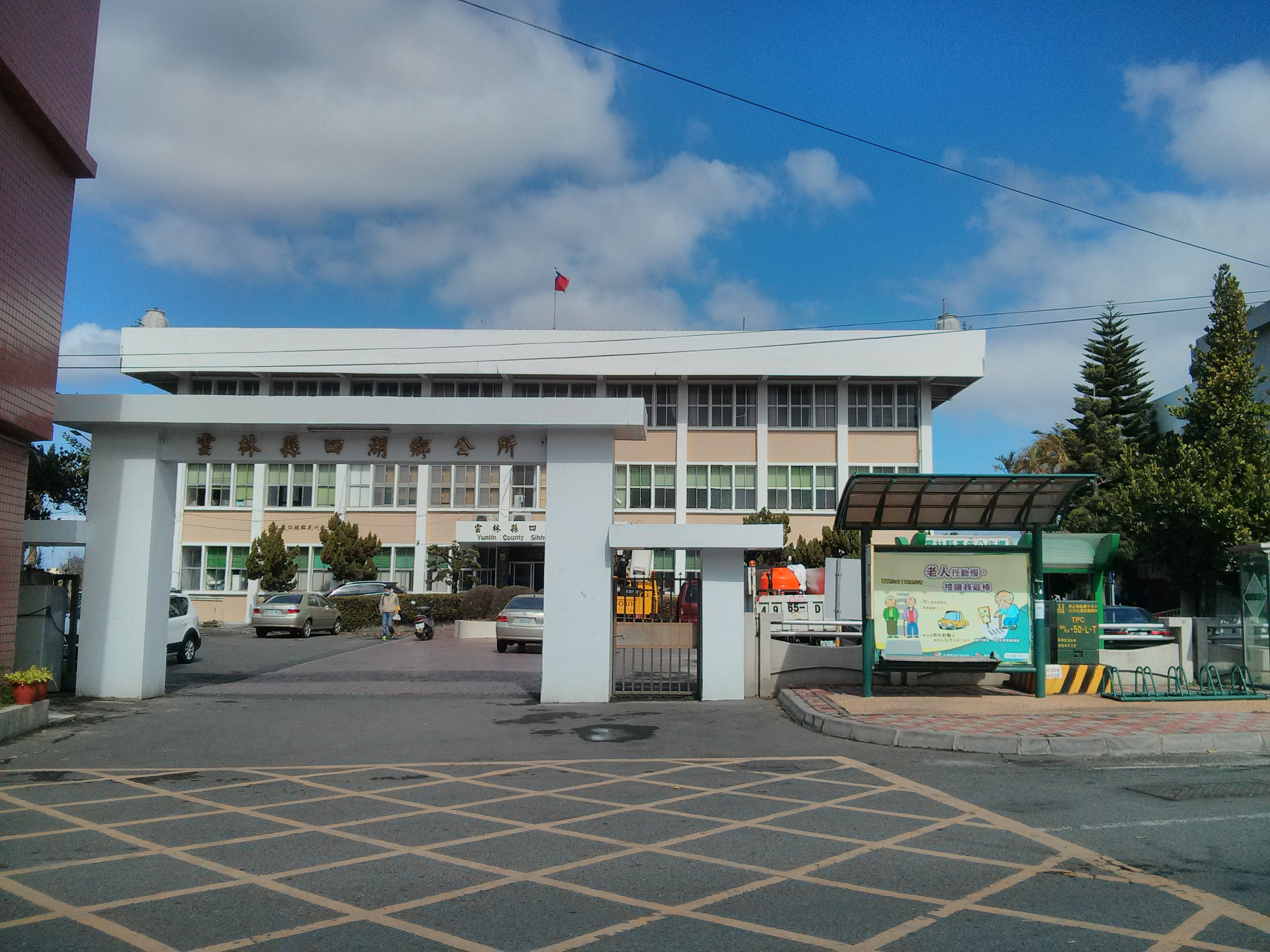
Sihu Township Office

Sihu Township (Chinese: 四湖鄉; pinyin: Sìhú Xiāng; Pe̍h-ōe-jī: Sì-ô͘-hiong, Wade–Giles: Szuhu) is a rural township in Yunlin County, Taiwan.

== Geography ==
As of February 2023, it has a population total of 21,458 and an area of 77.1189 km^{2}, including a section of coastline on the Taiwan Strait.

== History ==
Sihu's coastal waters were traditionally used in oyster farming, but in 1991 they were zoned for offshore industrial use.

== Administrative divisions ==
The township comprises 21 villages: Botung, Bozi, Caicuo, Feisha, Feitung, Guanggou, Huliao, Huxi, Lincuo, Lintung, Luchang, Lunbei, Lunnan, Neihu, Sanxing, Shihu, Sihu, Xiangdiao, Xide, Xinzhuang and Xiwei.

== Economy ==
The township produces radishes.

== Notable natives ==
- Chen Kuei-ru, running athlete
- Kerris Tsai, pop singer
- Lee Chin-yung, Magistrate of Yunlin County (2014–2018)
