= Rai Hau-min =

The Honourable Chief Justice Rai Hau-min
- 賴浩敏
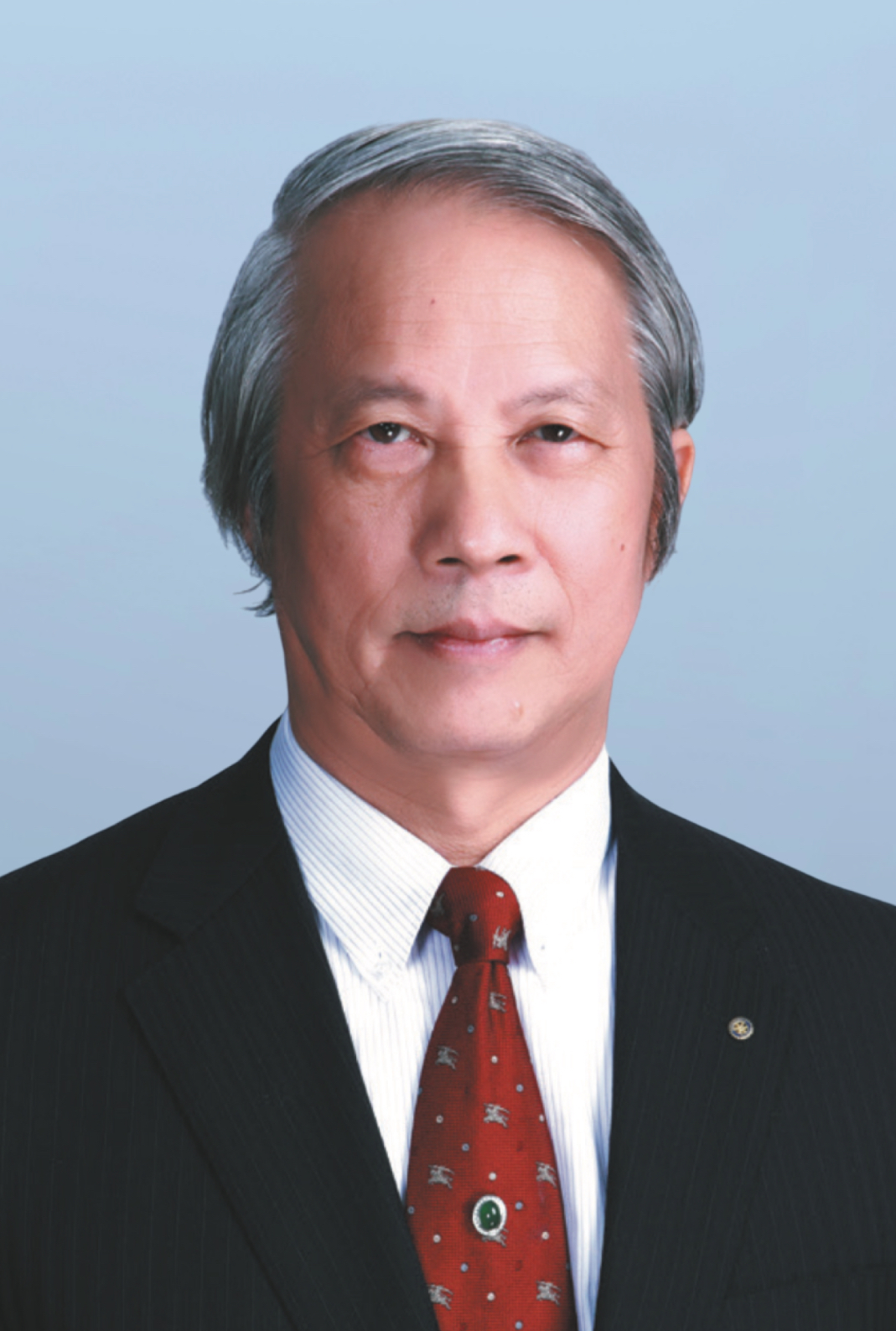
- Official portrait, 2010

10th President of the Judicial Yuan
- In office 13 October 2010 – 1 November 2016
- Appointed by: Ma Ying-jeou
- Vice President: Su Yeong-chin
- Preceded by: Hsieh Tsai-chuan (acting); Lai In-jaw
- Succeeded by: Hsu Tzong-li

1st Chairperson of the Central Election Commission
- In office 4 November 2009 – 12 October 2010
- Prime Minister: Wu Den-yih
- Preceded by: Position established Chang Cheng-hsiung
- Succeeded by: Liu I-chou (acting)

Personal details
- Born: 2 January 1939 (age 87) Tō'oku Village, Byōritsu District, Shinchiku Prefecture, Taiwan, Empire of Japan (modern-day Touwu, Miaoli County, Taiwan)
- Party: Independent
- Education: National Taiwan University (LLB); University of Tokyo (LLM)

Rai Hau-min

Chinese name
- Traditional Chinese: 賴浩敏
- Hanyu Pinyin: Lài Hàomǐn
- Hokkien POJ: Lōa Hō-bín
- Tâi-lô: Luā Hō-bín

Rai Hau-min (Chinese: 賴浩敏; pinyin: Lài Hàomǐn; Pe̍h-ōe-jī: Lōa Hō-bín; born 2 January 1939 in Tō'oku Village, Shinchiku Prefecture, Japanese Taiwan) is a Taiwanese attorney and judge who was the President of the Judicial Yuan of Taiwan from 2010 to 2016. Rai founded the Formosa Transnational Attorney at Law (萬國法律事務所) in 1974 and served as the Chairperson of the Central Election Commission from 4 November 2009 to 12 October 2010 before his appointment as President of the Judicial Yuan.

== Education ==
Rai earned his bachelor's and master's degrees in law from National Taiwan University and the University of Tokyo in Japan, respectively.

== Honors ==
- Grand Cordon of the Order of the Rising Sun, 2017

== See also ==
- Politics of Taiwan

Legal offices
Preceded by Lai In-Jaw	President of Judicial Yuan; 2010-2016	Succeeded by Hsu Tzong-li
