= Foguang =

Foguang may refer to:

- Foguang Temple, temple in Shanxi, China
- Foguang University, university located in Yilan, Taiwan

== See also ==
- Fo Guang Shan
