= Tuku Junior High School =

Tuku Junior High School 雲林縣立土庫國民中學
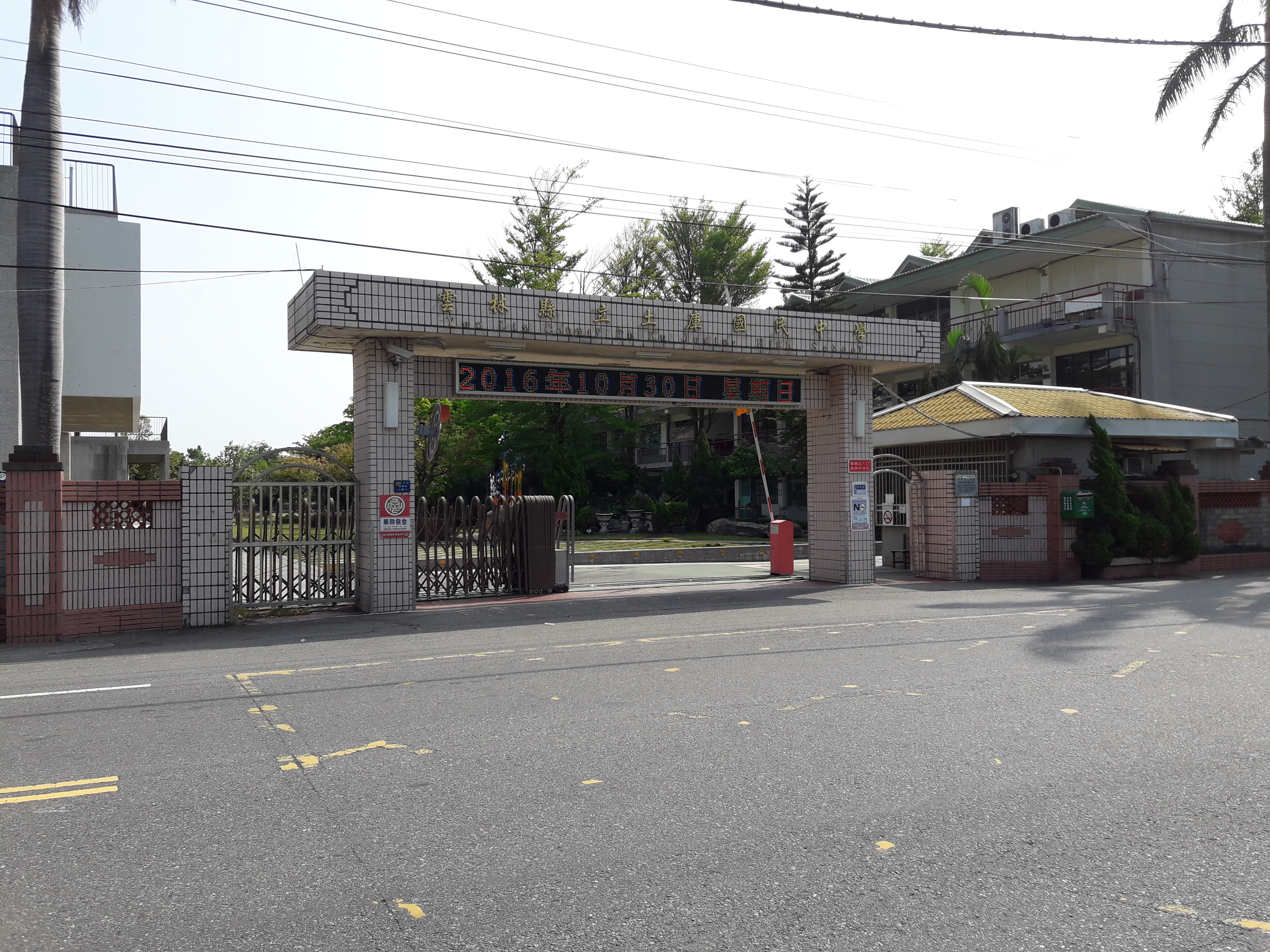
- The old gate of the school

Location
- Tuku, Yunlin County; Taiwan
- Coordinates: 23.6863°N 120.3884°E

Information
- Established: 1968
- Website: www.tkjh.ylc.edu.tw

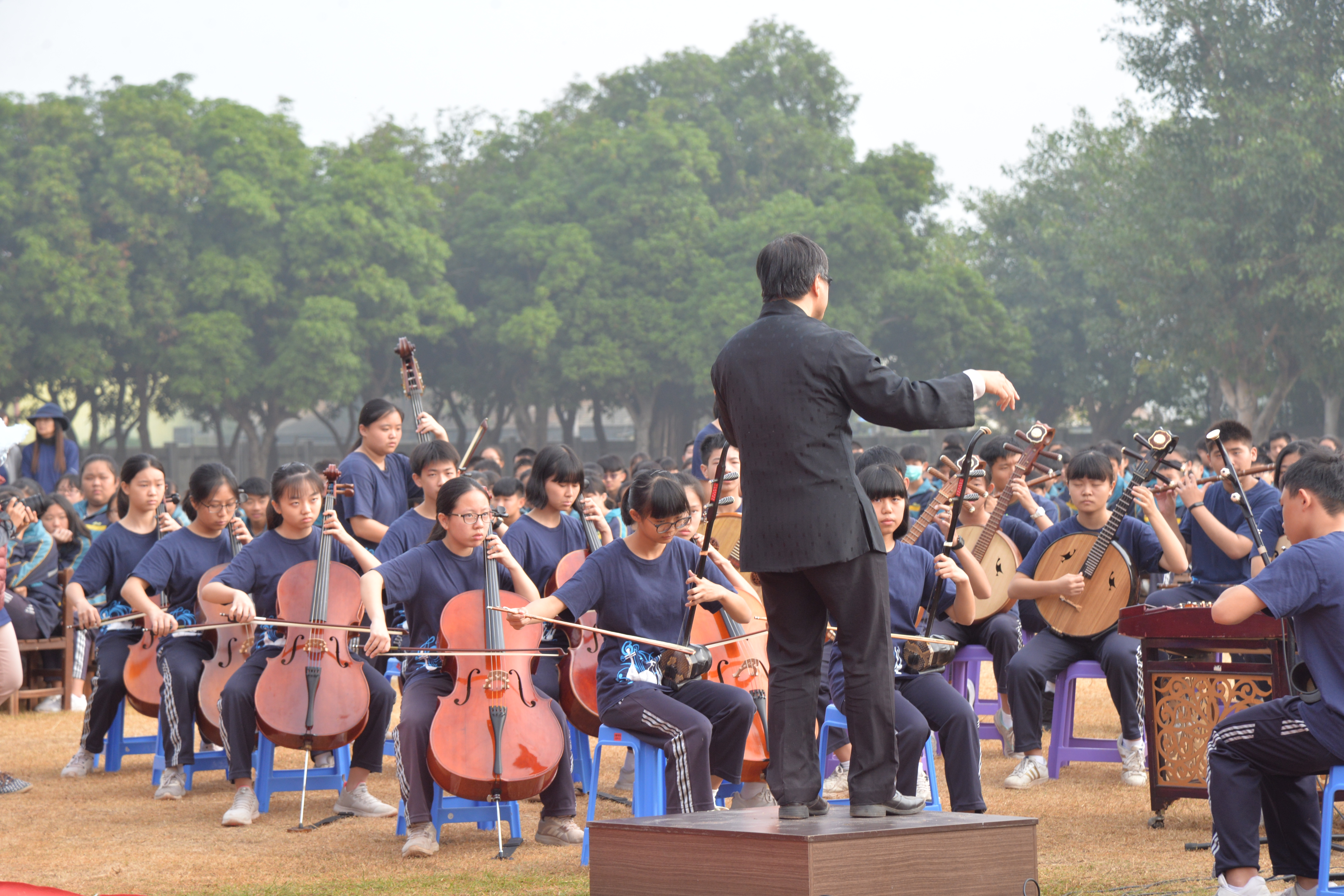
Tuku Junior High School Chinese Orchestra

The Yunlin County Tuku Junior High School (referred to as TKJH or TJHS Chinese: 雲林縣立土庫國民中學; pinyin: Yúnlín Xiàn lì Tǔkù Guómínzhōngxué; Wade–Giles: Yün-lin Hsien Li T'u-k'u Kuo-min-chung-hsüeh) is a junior high school located in Tuku, Yunlin, Taiwan, which has two kinds of special classes - Chinese music (art talent) class and PE class.

Tuku Junior high school was established in 1968. The first principal was Wang Liang-fu, and then was Liu Ho-pi(劉和璧), Lin Chiu-hua(林久華), Hsieh Fei-fei(謝霏霏), Jhong Jin-sen(鍾進森), Yang Shan-yuan(楊善淵), and Chen Chien-lung(陳健隆).

The alumnus including the former Yunlin County Mayors Chang Jung-wei(張榮味) and Chang Li-shan(張麗善). After Yang Shan-yuan started his term, he began to find foreign schools to cultural exchange, like Cheongdo Middle School in South Korea.

The school's area is around by farms and residential areas. The building Southern Tzu-chiang Building is listed the historical buildings of Yunlin.

== History ==
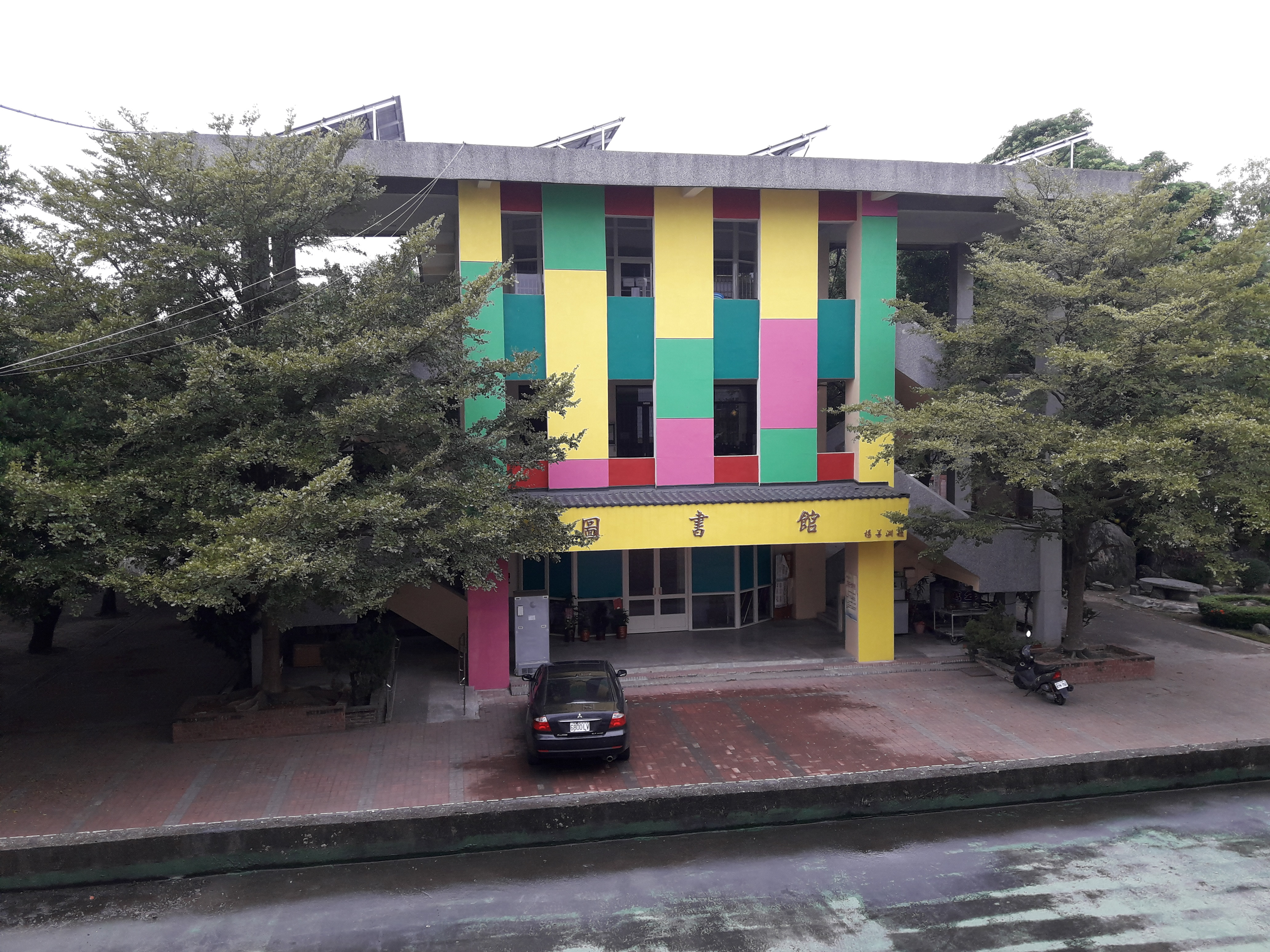
Library (Former Chiang Kai-shek Library). (Note: It was removed the word "Chiang Kai-shek" in its official name after Yang Shan-yuan began to be the principal.)

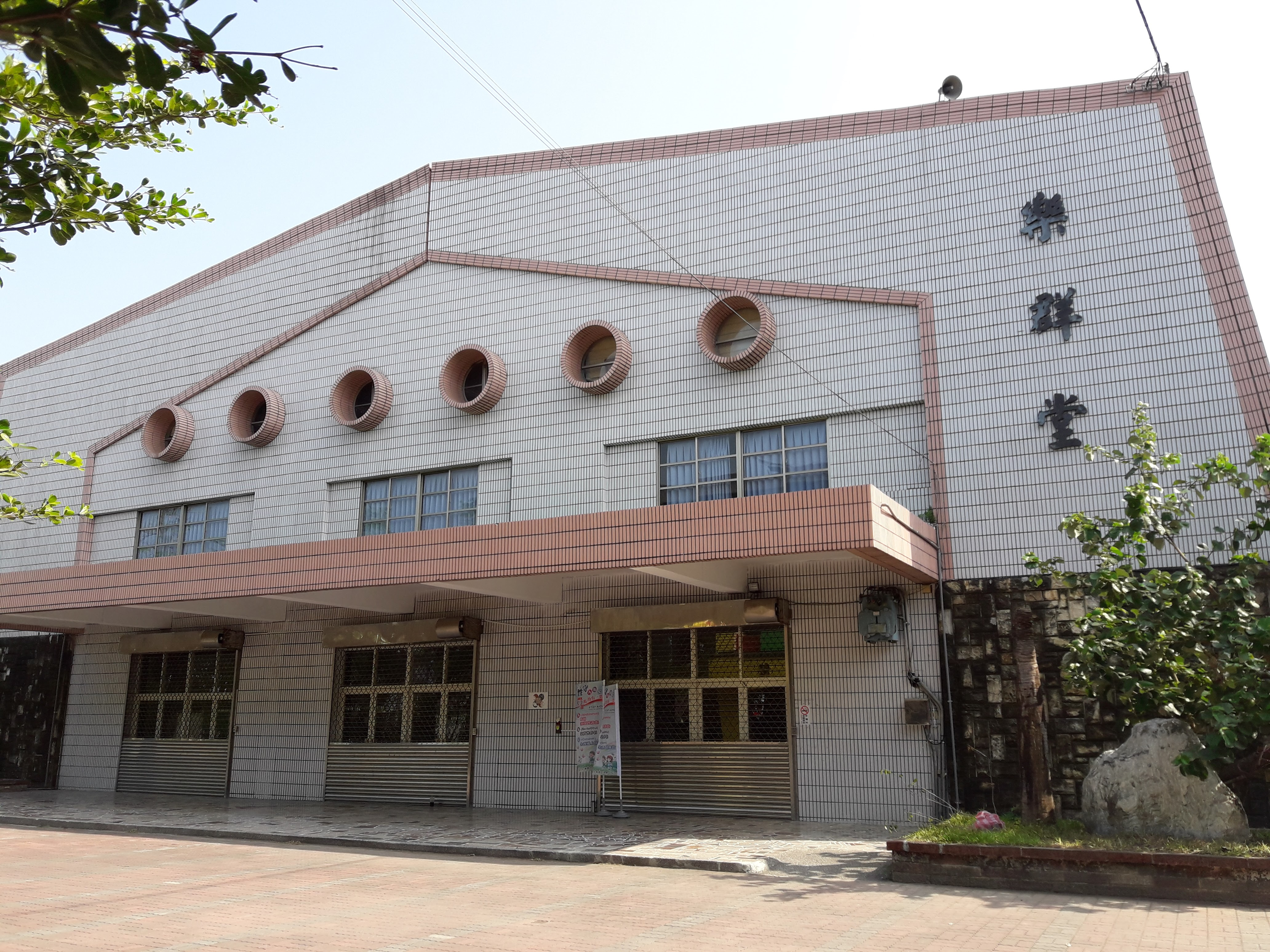
The activity center "Yao-chun Hall".

In 1968, the government of the Republic of China started 9-year compulsory education and claimed that each townships will have a junior high school. At that time, there is no junior high school in Tuku Township, so the Yunlin County Government ordered the former principal of the Pao-chung Junior High School(褒忠國中), Liu Tai-tzung(劉岱宗), to prepare to create a junior high school there. The Tuku Junior High School was established on August 1, its first principal was Wang Liang-fu(王梁甫), he was assigned by the Taiwan Provincial Government. Wang transferred to be principal of the Tuku VHS of C&I(土庫高級商工職業學校) in 1980, Liu Ho-pi(劉和璧) took over as the second principal.

In 1976, Tuku Junior High School built a library and named it the Chiang Kai-shek Library(中正圖書館) to commemorate the late President Chiang Kai-shek of the Republic of China; a swimming pool was built in 1978. Principal Liu retired in 1993, Lin Chiu-hwa(林久華) began to manage the TKJH until 1998, he decided to remove the swimming pool in 1994. In 1995, the county government accepted local request, three of the villages of Huwei Township - Yanping Village(延平里), Dongtun Village(東屯里), and Xitun Village(西屯里) - were listed into the common school district of the Ch'ung-to Junior High School(崇德國中) and the Tuku Junior High School. In the same year, a student of the TKJH raped an 8-year-old girl, locals are very concerned about this.

After Principal Lin, the school has gone through the leadership of Principal Hsieh Fei-fei(謝霏霏), Principal Jhong Jin-sen(鍾進森), and Principal Yang Shan-yuan(楊善淵). The covered court was completed during Yang's tenure. The current principal is Chen Chien-lung(陳健隆).

=== Sister schools ===
The TKJH has a sister school: in Gyeongbuk, South Korea.

== Campus ==
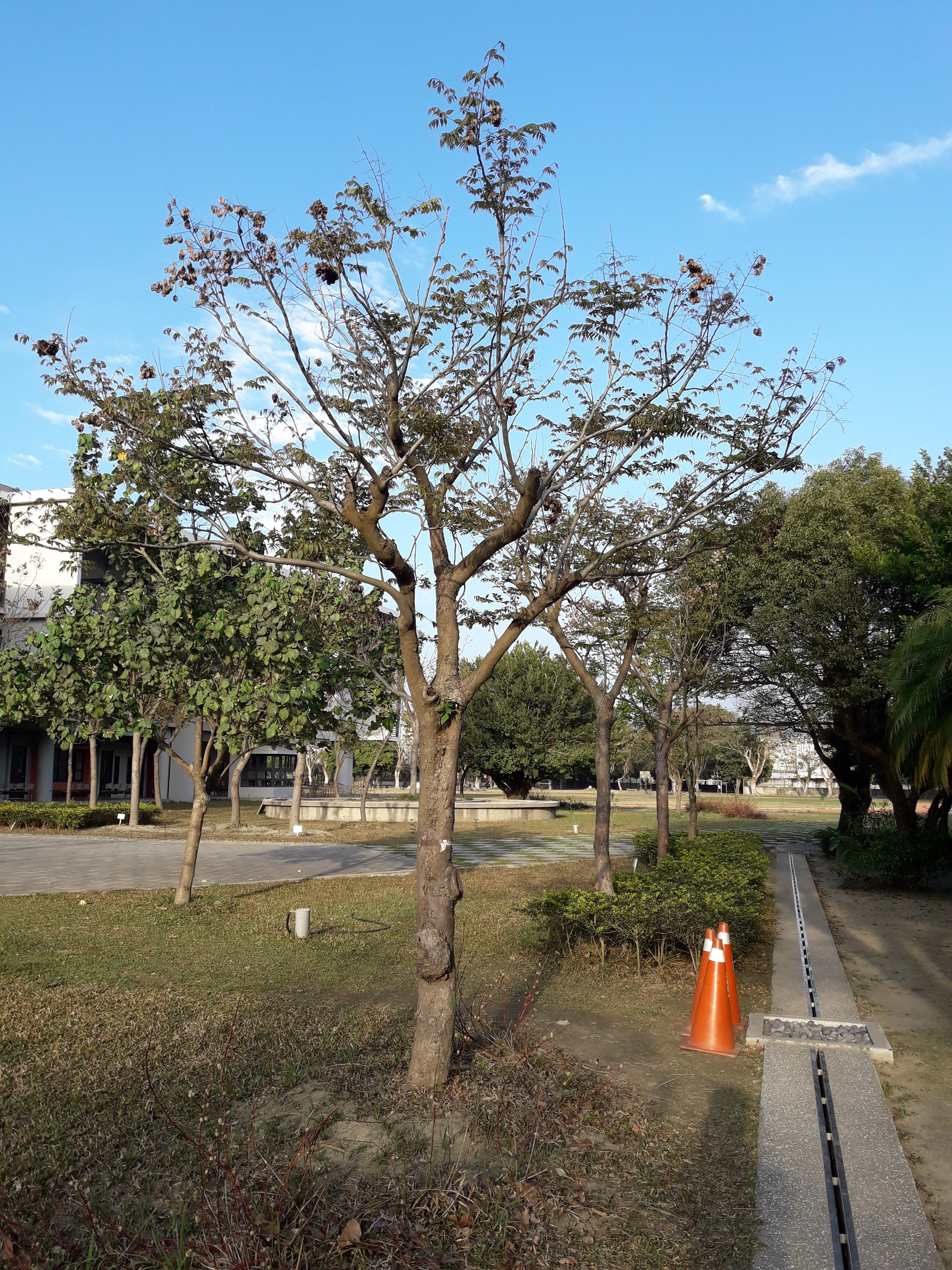
Koelreuteria elegans in the campus.

Tuku Junior High School is located in Fuxing(復興), Tuku, Yunlin. Its area is about 5 hectares. At the time of establishment, the campus and its surroundings were desolate. The campus is surrounded by farmland and some houses now.
