= Lai In-jaw =

Taiwanese jurist and politician

- 賴英照
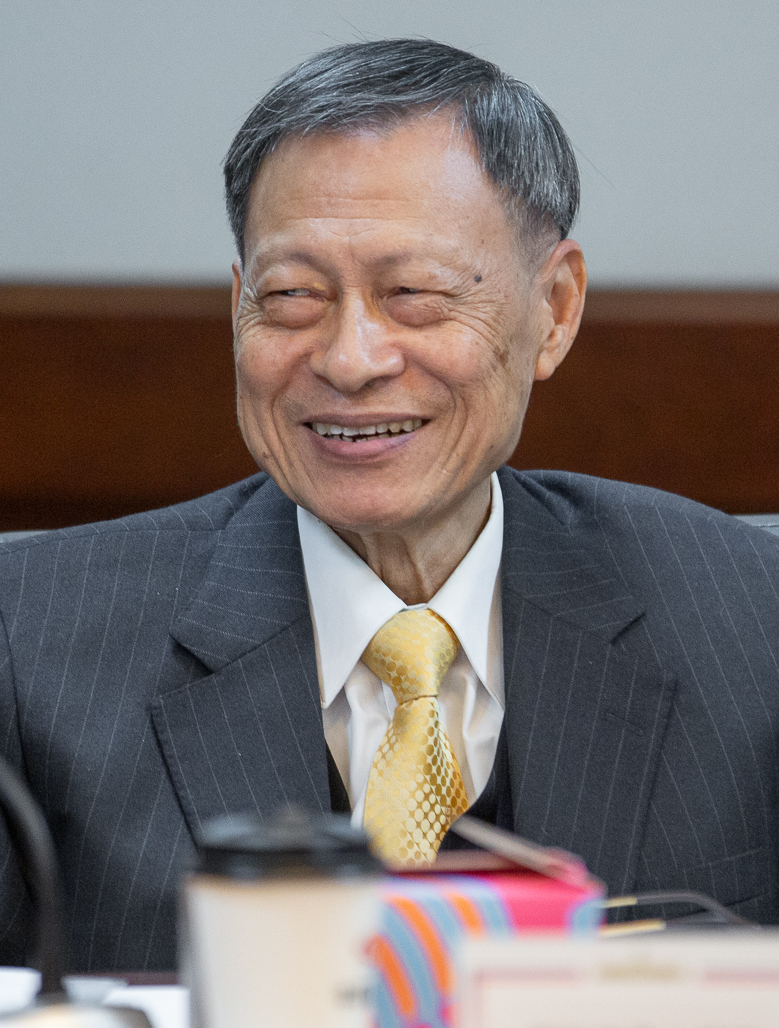
- Lai in 2023

9th President of the Judicial Yuan
- In office 1 October 2007 – 18 July 2010
- President: Chen Shui-bian; Ma Ying-jeou
- Preceded by: Weng Yueh-sheng
- Succeeded by: Hsieh Tsay-chuan (acting); Rai Hau-min

15th Deputy Chief Justice of Taiwan
- In office 7 April 2006 – 1 October 2007
- Chief Justice: Weng Yueh-sheng
- Preceded by: Cheng Chun-mo
- Succeeded by: Hsieh Tsay-chuan

18th Vice Premier of the Republic of China
- In office 6 October 2000 – 1 February 2002
- Premier: Chang Chun-hsiung
- Preceded by: Chang Chun-hsiung
- Succeeded by: Lin Hsin-i

2nd Vice Governor of Taiwan Province
- In office 1 July 1996 – 1 July 1998
- Governor: James Soong
- Preceded by: Lin Fong-cheng
- Succeeded by: Position abolished

Personal details
- Born: 24 August 1946 (age 80) Jiaoxi, Yilan County, Taiwan
- Education: National Ilan University (BS); National Chung Hsing University (LLB); National Taiwan University (LLM); Harvard University (LLM, SJD)

Lai In-Jaw
- Traditional Chinese: 賴英照
- Simplified Chinese: 赖英照
Transcriptions
Standard Mandarin
- Hanyu Pinyin: Laì Yīnzhaò
- Wade–Giles: Laì Yìn-chaò
Southern Min
- Hokkien POJ: Lōa Eng-chiàu

Lai In-jaw (Chinese: 賴英照; pinyin: Laì Yīnzhaò; Pe̍h-ōe-jī: Lōa Eng-chiàu) is a Taiwanese politician and jurist who was the former president of the Judicial Yuan as well as Chief Justice of the Constitutional Court. He was the senior advisor to President Chen Shui-bian for a short time before taking his position in the Judicial Yuan.

== Early life and education ==
Lai was born in Jiaoxi Township, Yilan County. As a child, his father gifted him a copy of Three Hundred Tang Poems, which he memorized. He achieved outstanding grades in primary school and enrolled in a five-year degree program at the Taiwan Provincial Ilan School of Agriculture and Forestry (now National Ilan University). After graduating, he completed mandatory military service in the Republic of China Armed Forces and simultaneously studied for the college entrance exam.

Upon finishing military service, Lai was admitted to study law at National Chung Hsing University, where he attended night classes, worked for the National Youth Division of Taiwan and the Taipei City Government, and graduated as valedictorian. After earning a Bachelor of Laws (LL.B.) in 1973, Lai proceeded to the National Taiwan University and completed a Master of Laws (LL.M.) in 1976.

Lai then went to the United States to enroll in Harvard University, where he studied under law professor Louis Loss. He earned another Master of Laws (LL.M.) and a Doctor of Juridical Science (S.J.D.) in 1977 and 1981, respectively, from Harvard Law School. His doctoral dissertation was titled, "Legal problems of parent-subsidiary corporations in Taiwan".

== Career ==
Lai taught at the College of Law and Business, National Chung Hsing University (now National Taipei University) from 1981 to 1984. After that, he took up various government posts in the Ministry of Finance. In October 2000 during the first term of President Chen Shui-bian, he became the Vice Premier under Premier Chang Chun-hsiung. He was succeeded by Lin Hsin-i in February 2002.

Appointed by President Chen in 2007, Lai was promoted to the president of Judicial Yuan, after serving as a judge since 2003. He stepped down in July 2010 as a result of corruption scandal among four judges of Taiwan Higher Court. In June 2011, after further public protests over the conduct of judges, the Legislative Yuan passed the Judges Act, which created a mechanism for the external evaluation and removal of unfit judges. He turned down the offer of senior advisors to the office of the president of the Republic of China in the same year.

Lai now serves as a lecture professor of National Chung Hsing University, National Taipei University and Chung Yuan Christian University.
