= Chang Chuan-tien =

Taiwanese politician

- 張川田

Member of the Legislative Yuan
- In office 1 February 1999 – 10 September 2006
- Constituency: Yilan County

Member of the National Assembly
- In office 1992–1997

Personal details
- Born: 15 August 1945 Shōkei, Giran, Taihoku Prefecture, Taiwan, Empire of Japan (today Jiaoxi, Yilan County, Taiwan)
- Died: 10 September 2006 (aged 61) Jiaoxi, Yilan, Taiwan
- Party: Democratic Progressive Party (since 1986)
- Children: 4
- Education: Tunghai University (BA)

Chang Chuan-tien (Chinese: 張川田; pinyin: Zhāng Chuāntián; 15 August 1945 – 10 September 2006) was a Taiwanese politician.

== Early life and education ==
Chang was born in Taihoku Prefecture of Japanese Taiwan, in what is now Jiaoxi, Yilan. He earned a bachelor's degree in political science from Tunghai University, graduating in 1973.

== Political career ==
He cofounded the Democratic Progressive Party in 1986, and was a member of the Yilan Gang, a DPP clique. Chang served in the National Assembly from 1992 to 1997, and in 1998, was elected to the Legislative Yuan. He represented his hometown Yilan County district until he died in 2006 from liver failure, aged 61.
