= Chen In-chin =

Taiwanese university professor

- 陳英鈐

Chairperson of Central Election Commission of the Republic of China
- In office 17 November 2017 – 25 November 2018
- Vice: Chen Chao-chien (陳朝建)
- Preceded by: Liu I-chou
- Succeeded by: Chen Chao-chien (acting); Lee Chin-yung

Personal details
- Education: National Taiwan University (LLB, LLM); Heidelberg University (PhD)

Chen In-chin (traditional Chinese: 陳英鈐; simplified Chinese: 陈英钤; pinyin: Chén Yīngqián) is a Taiwanese lawyer and legal scholar. He is a law professor at National Central University. He was the Chairperson of Central Election Commission from 17 November 2017 to 25 November 2018.

== Education and academic career ==
Chen graduated with his bachelor's and master's degree in law from National Taiwan University in 1986 and 1992 respectively. He then earned his doctoral degree in law from Heidelberg University in Germany in 1999.

Chen began teaching at Ming Chuan University as an assistant professor of law in 2000. He was promoted to associate professor in 2003. He left Ming Chuan University for National Central University (NCU) in 2006, and was appointed to the rank of full professor in 2008. He was the director of the Graduate Institute of Law and Government at NCU between 2015 and 2017.He received the Research Excellence Award of National Central University in 2015. 2022 and 2024, respectively.

== Central Election Commission ==
Chen won 70 of 72 ballots in a Legislative Yuan vote in November 2017, confirming him to the chairmanship of the Central Election Commission.

Chen believed he was impeached for his faithful implementation of Interpretation Nr. 748. Interpretation No. 748 requires lawmakers to legalize same-sex marriage within two years, as long as it allows same-sex couples to get married, either by amending the Civil Code or enacting a special law, and if the Legislative Yuan has not completed amending the law by May 24, 2019, same-sex couples can register for marriage directly under the Civil Code. Judicial Yuan President Hsu Tzong-li said "the result of the referendum cannot contradict the holdings of the Taiwan Constitutional Court" 。The Supreme Administrative Court ruling reveals that the Central Election Commission (CEC) has a "constitutional obligation to deliver a constitutional administrative act" by examining whether the referendum proposal complies with Interpretation of the Taiwan Constitutional Court.

Former Ombudswoman Ms. Gau Fehng-Shian believed that "same-sex marriage is against public order and morality" ，and "the laws of men are no match for morality, much less for the law of Christ," she vowed to "become a wise overseer, making laws after God's will. She invited representatives of religious groups to form the Taiwan Religious Alliance for Family Protection (TAFP) in 2013 to oppose gay marriage. The Family Protection League and other groups opposing same-sex marriage formed the Next Generation Happiness Coalition (CHNG). The leading proposer of the 12th national referendum, Tseng Hsien-Ying, is one member of the CHNG.

During the referendum campaign, Ombudswoman Ms. Gau called Mr. Tseng and offered to help in any way she could. The Executive Yuan submitted updated submissions on October 29, 2018, clearly stating, if this ballot initiative is passed, the government will proceed to realize the right of same-sex marriage. The supplemental submission annoyed Mr. Tseng. After reading the updated opinion, "many (anti-gay-marriage) people are now rumoring whether the 12th referendum is invalid, whether they should vote no (to this referendum)?" "Our (Mr. Tseng’s campaign) office has received over 250 phone calls per day from citizens asking if they should go to vote. How should they vote”. On November 15, 2018, Mr. Tseng petitioned his case to Ombudswoman Ms. Gau, saying that the government’s position paper has "confused voters' judgment". Ms. Gau immediately sent two official letters to the CEC before the referendum, requesting accountability for the “confusion of voters judgement”. Chen resigned after the local election on 24 November 2018. On 7 November 2019, the Control Yuan voted to impeach Chen. The investigatory agency determined that the Organic Law of the Central Election Commission was violated during the 2018 Taiwanese referendum. The impeachment reiterates that the CEC's announcement of the Executive Yuan's clarification to let the public understand that if the referendum passes, same-sex couples will be able to marry under a special law is confusing the (anti-gay-marriage) public's judgment.

After reading the original submission of the Executive Yuan, Associate Professor of the Department of Law at the University of Taipei, Ms. Guan Xiaowei believes that if the referendum is passed, it will "exclude same-sex couples from marriage" and that it will only be possible to formulate a separate "civil union for same-sex couples" in addition to the Civil Code. She discussed with other constitutional scholars, some of whom believed that same-sex couples can still get married" even if the referendum is passed. Even constitutional scholars, not to mention the general public, disagree on the legal effect of the referendum, which is known as "voter confusion"官曉薇:反同婚公投「提案內容」與「提案真意」不符中選會應徹查. The said referendum was passed on November 24, 2018, and international media such as the Associated Press (AP News), the British Broadcasting Corporation (bbc), Al Jazeera (Al Jazeera), and The Guardian reported that most Taiwanese rejected the legalization of same-sex marriage through the referendum.

On February 21, 2019, the Executive Yuan passed the draft of the " Act for Implementation of J.Y. Interpretation No. 748" (司法院釋字第七四八號釋施行法) under the premise of complying with Interpretation 748 and the said Referendum. On May 17, 2019, the Legislature enacted a special law-" Act for Implementation of J.Y. Interpretation No. 748(the implementation law)" (司法院釋字第七四八號解釋施行法) (《實施法》), whereby same-sex couples may register their marriages with household registration offices. Taiwan became the first country in Asia to legalize same-sex marriage.

On January 4, 2020, CHNG General Director You Hsin-yi (the leading sponsor of the 10th national referendum) talked openly with Ombudswoman Ms. Gau about the 2018 referendum and she received the Certificate of Appreciation from the Taiwan Christian Federation After the implementation law was passed, the CHNG's May 21, 2019 press release stated that the implementation law was a smear tactic to 'take the meaning of the referendum out of context'. Mr. Tseng believes that the implementation law violates the referendum intention. According to Article 30, Paragraph 3 of the Referendum Law, the leading sponsor may request the Judicial Yuan to interpret the law, but Mr. Tseng did not request the Judicial Yuan to interpret the law. Tseng considered that the implementation law was against the will of the majority voters, and claimed that he would initiate a referendum on the implementation of the law, but he did not initiate any referendum.

The Secretary General of the Chinese Regional Bishops’ Conference, who also opposes same-sex marriage, argued that the CHNG was "asking for trouble" by pushing for a referendum Nr. 12. According to the Catholic doctrine, "marriage is between one man and one woman". Referendum Nr. 12 has become a "push" for same-sex marriage, which is exactly the opposite of the CHNG's purpose .
