= Wufengqi Waterfall =

Waterfall in Jiaoxi, Yilan County, Taiwan

Wufengqi Waterfall 五峰旗瀑布
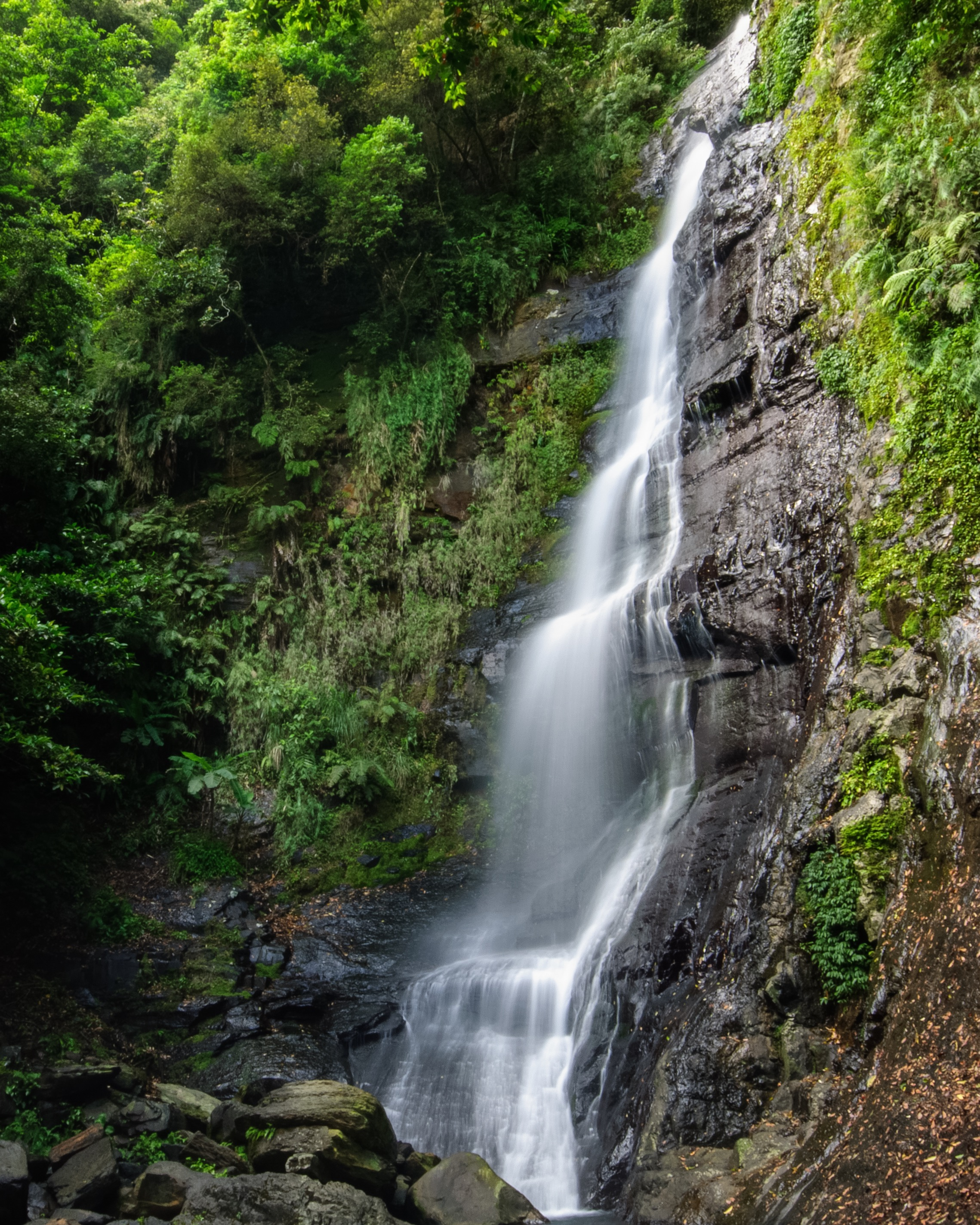
- Interactive map of Wufengqi Waterfall 五峰旗瀑布
- Location: Jiaoxi, Yilan County, Taiwan
- Coordinates: 23°35′46.8″N 120°42′30.9″E
- Type: waterfall

The Wufengqi Waterfalls (Chinese: 五峰旗瀑布; pinyin: Wǔfēngqí Pùbù) are a popular tourist attraction located in the Wufengqi Scenic Area in Jiaoxi Township, Yilan County, Taiwan. They are so named because they stand in front of a row of five steep mountains, whose sharp peaks resemble the five triangular flags (三角旗) hanging down the back of war generals in Chinese opera.

== Geology ==
The waterfalls consist of three layers, with a total drop of 100 meters. The upper layer flows rapidly through a narrow mountain chasm while the bottom layer ends at the entrance of the Wufengqi Scenic Area, where there are a barbecue area and a play area for children. A viewing pavilion built by the middle layer allows visitors to enjoy the lush mountains and the cascades of water from the steep mountains.

== Transportation ==
The waterfalls are accessible by the Taiwan Tourist Shuttle from Jiaoxi Station of Taiwan Railway.

== See also ==
- List of waterfalls
