= Jiaoxi, Yilan =

Rural township in Yilan County, Taiwan

Coordinates: 24°49′N 121°46′E

Jiaoxi Township 礁溪鄉 Shōkei
- Rural township

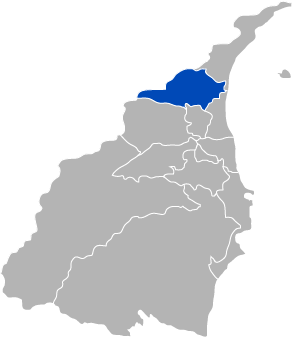
- Jiaoxi Township in Yilan County
- Country: Republic of China (Taiwan)
- County: (Yilan County, Taiwan) Yilan
- Rural villages (村): 18

Government
  - Leader (鄉長): Chang Yung-Te (張永德)

Area
  - Total: 101.4278 km^{2} (39.1615 sq mi)

Population (September 2023)
  - Total: 34,932
  - Density: 344.40/km^{2} (892.00/sq mi)
- Time zone: UTC+8 (National Standard Time)
- Postal code: 262
- Website: jiaosi.e-land.gov.tw (in Chinese)

Jiaoxi Township (Chinese: 礁溪鄉; Hanyu Pinyin: jiāo xī xiāng; Tongyong Pinyin: Jiaosi Siang; Wade–Giles: Chiao^{1}-hsi^{1} Hsiang^{1}; Pe̍h-ōe-jī: Ta-khe-hiong, Taⁿ-khe-hiong, Taⁿ-kheⁿ-hiong) or Chiaohsi Township is a rural township in the northern section of Yilan County, Taiwan.

== Geography ==
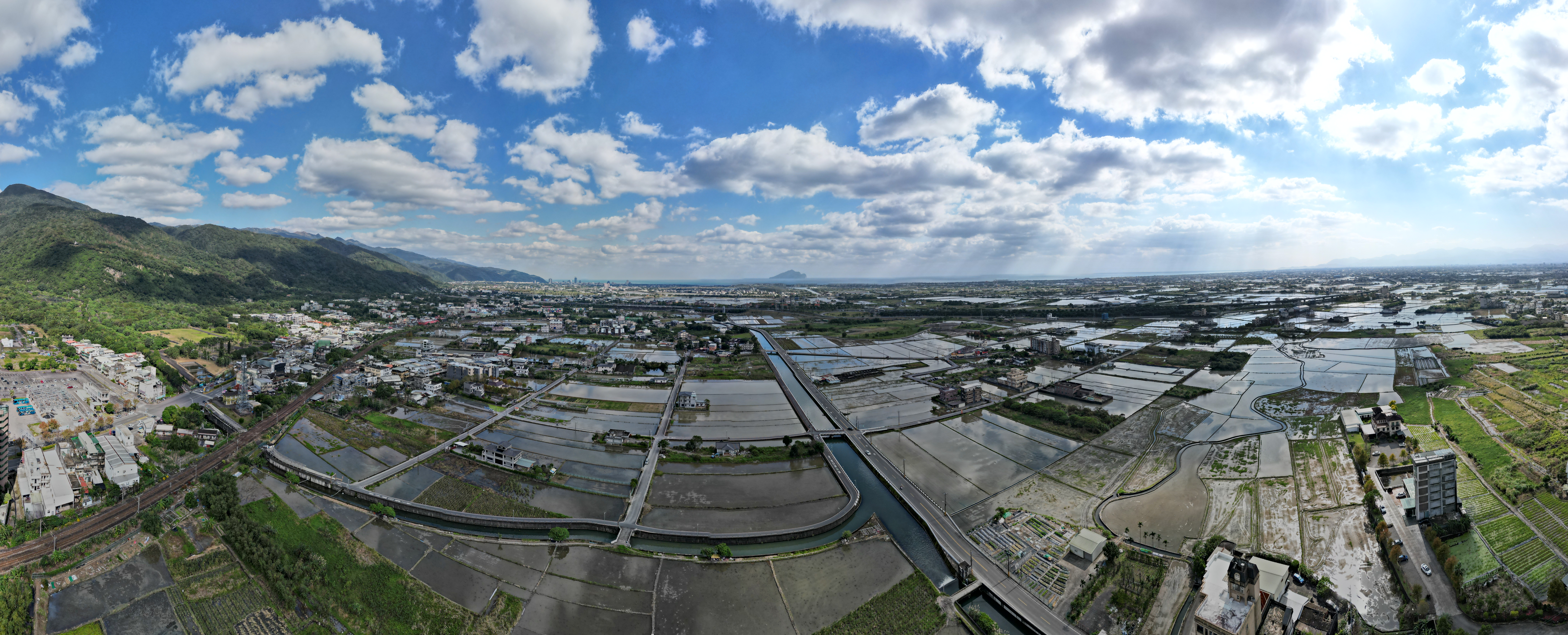
Jiaoxi Township in Yilan from above with Turtle Island 龜山島, Taiwan's one active Volcano, sitting on the horizon in the middle of the frame.

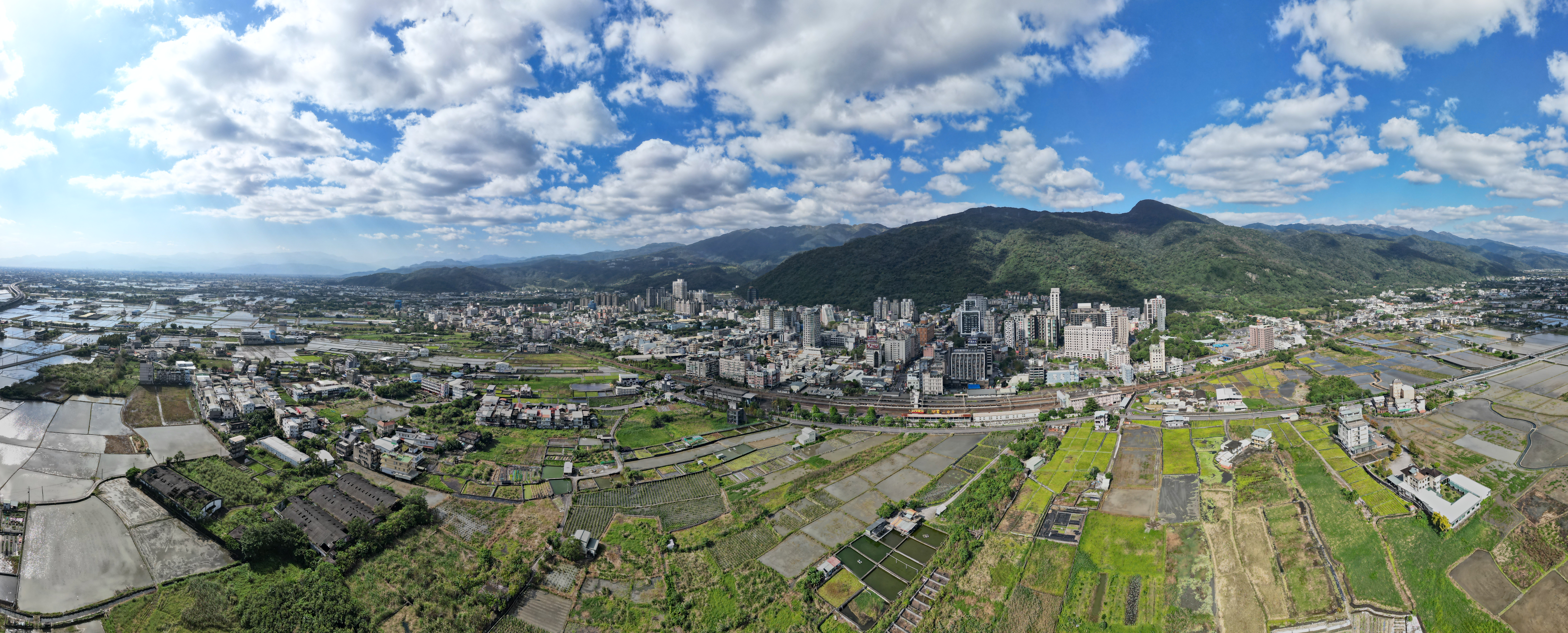
Jiaoxi Aerial Panorama with Jiaoxi Train Station in the middle of the frame. December 2022.

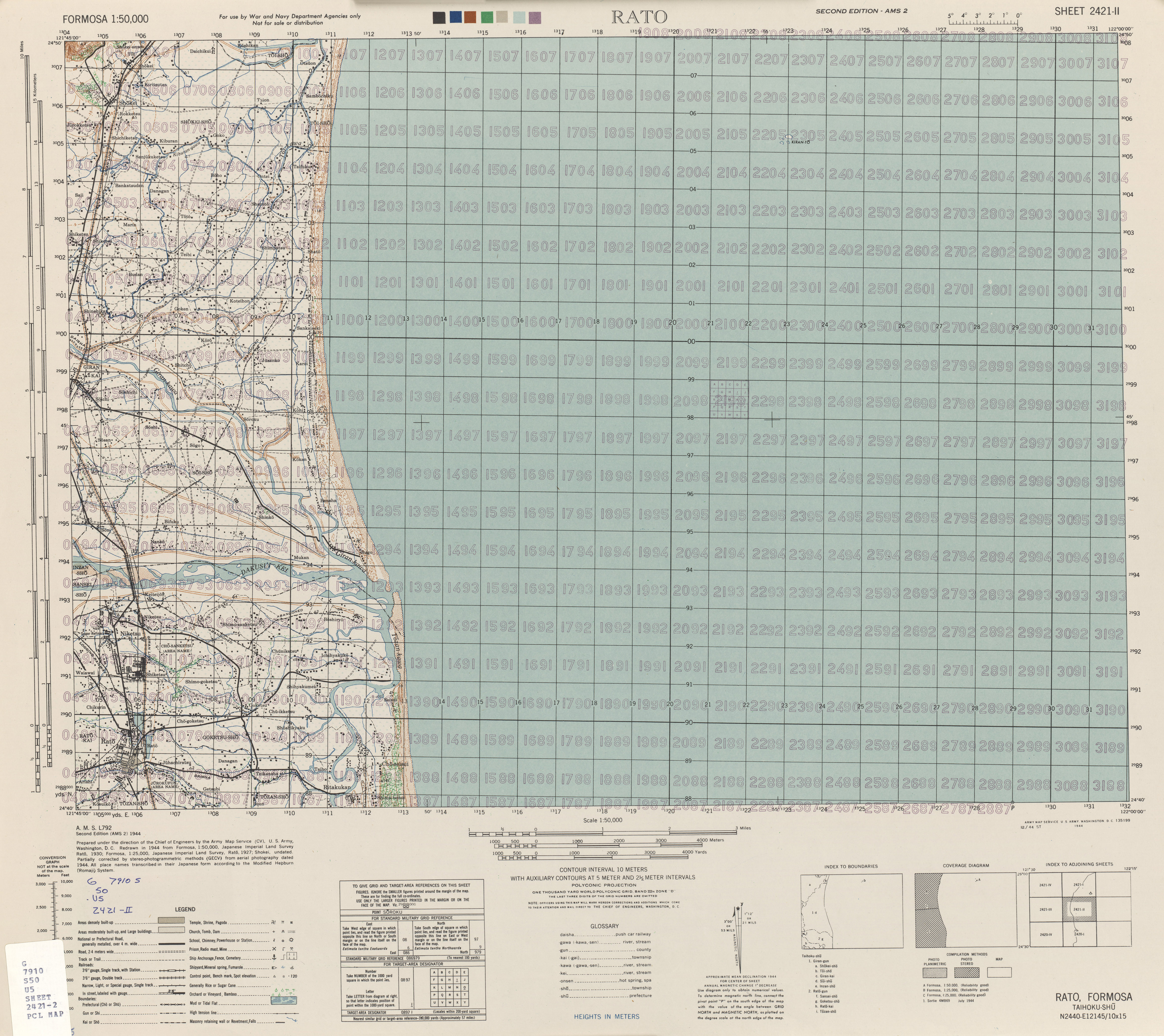
Map including Jiaoxi (labeled as Shōkei) (1944)

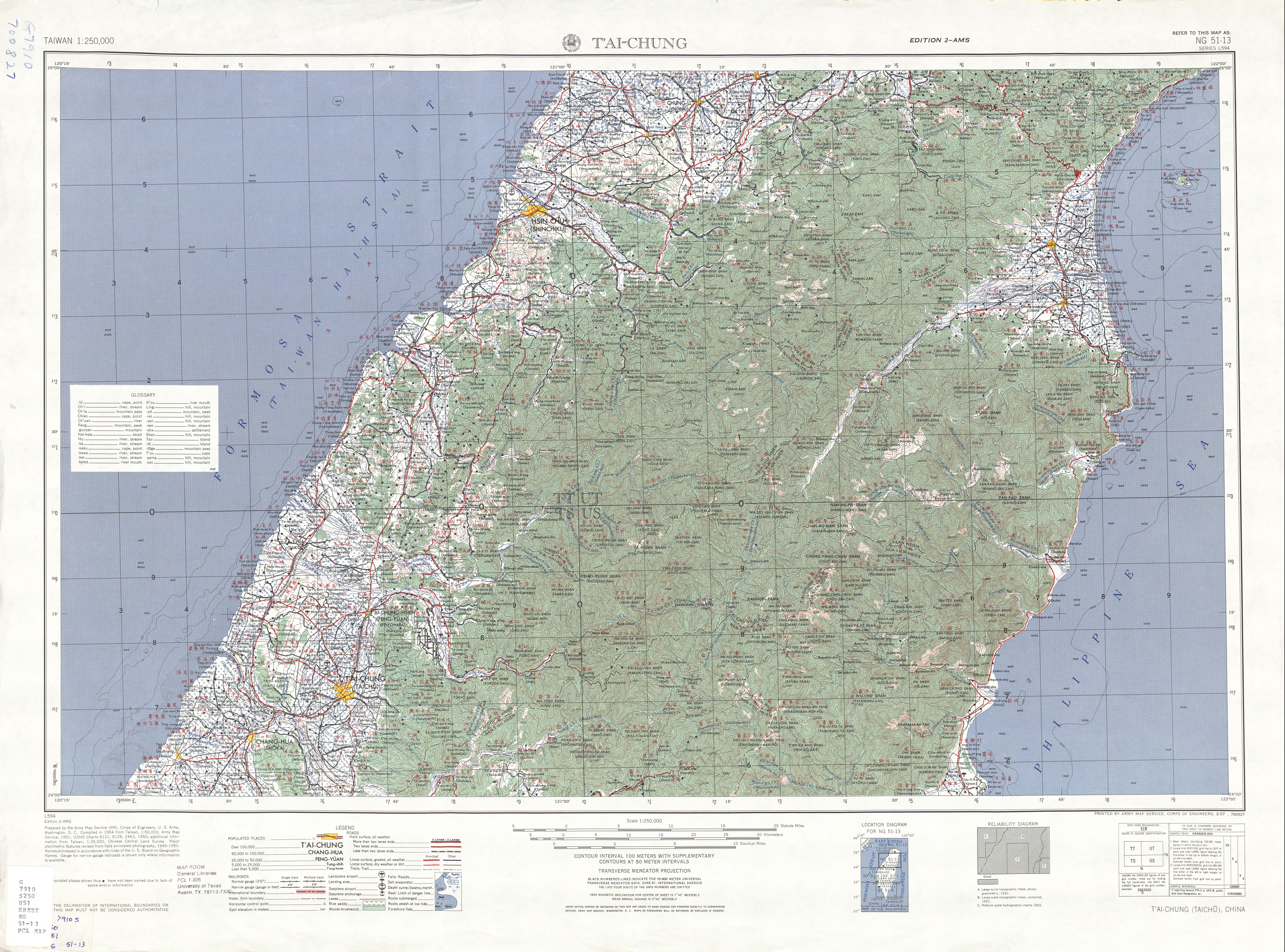
Map including Jiaoxi (labeled as Chiao-chʻi (Shōkei) 礁溪) (1954)

- Area: 101.43 km^{2}
- Population: 35,399 (December 2024)

== Administrative divisions ==
The township includes eighteen villages:

- Baiyun (白雲村), Yushi (Yushih; 玉石村), Deyang (德陽村), Dazhong (大忠村), Dayi (大義村), Liujie (六結村), Erlong (二龍村), Shichao (時潮村), Yutian (玉田村), Sanmin (三民村), Linmei (林美村), Baie (白鵝村), Yuguang (玉光村), Guangwu (光武村), Wusha (吳沙村), Longtan (龍潭村), Paolun (匏崙村) and Erjie Village (二結村).

== Education ==
As of 2024, about 24% of the population had a bachelor's degree. Jiaoxi has five elementary and two junior high schools. It is home to two universities as listed below.

- Fo Guang University
- Tamkang University Lanyang Campus

== Tourist attractions ==
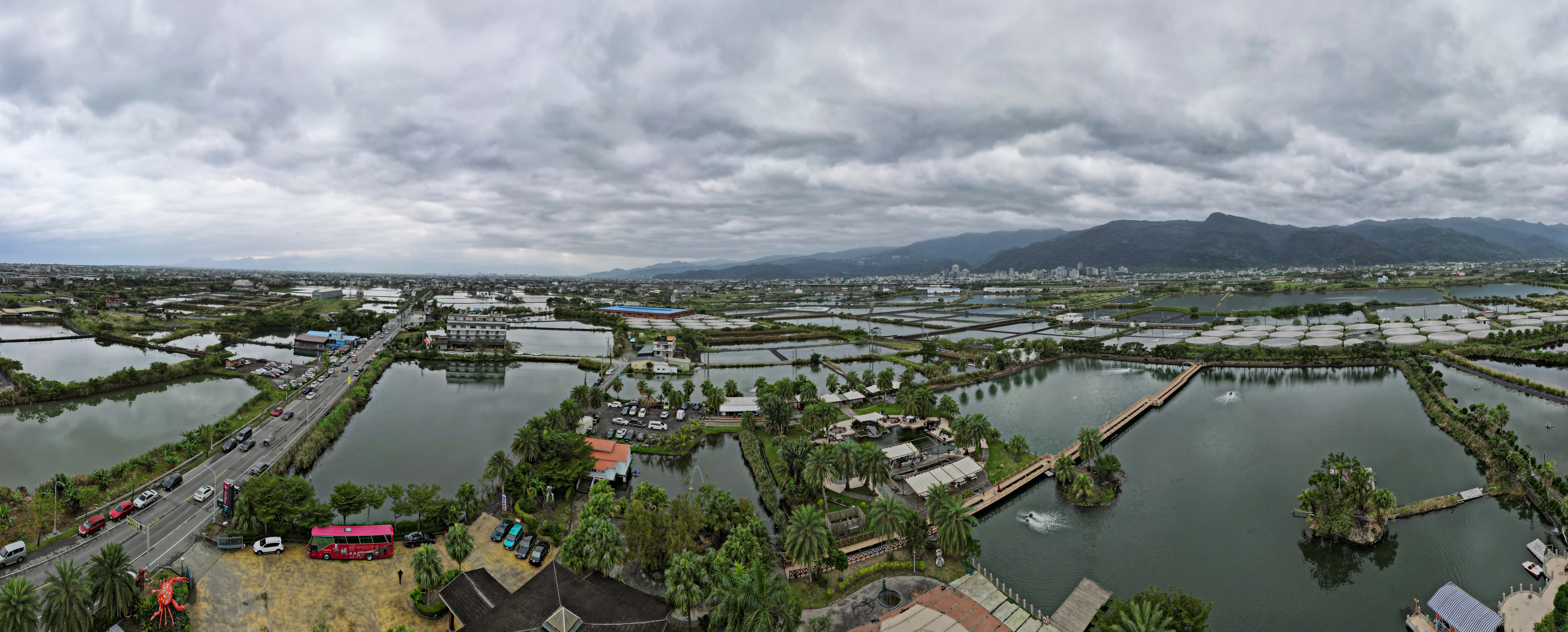
Aerial panorama of Jiaoxi rural township. December 2022.

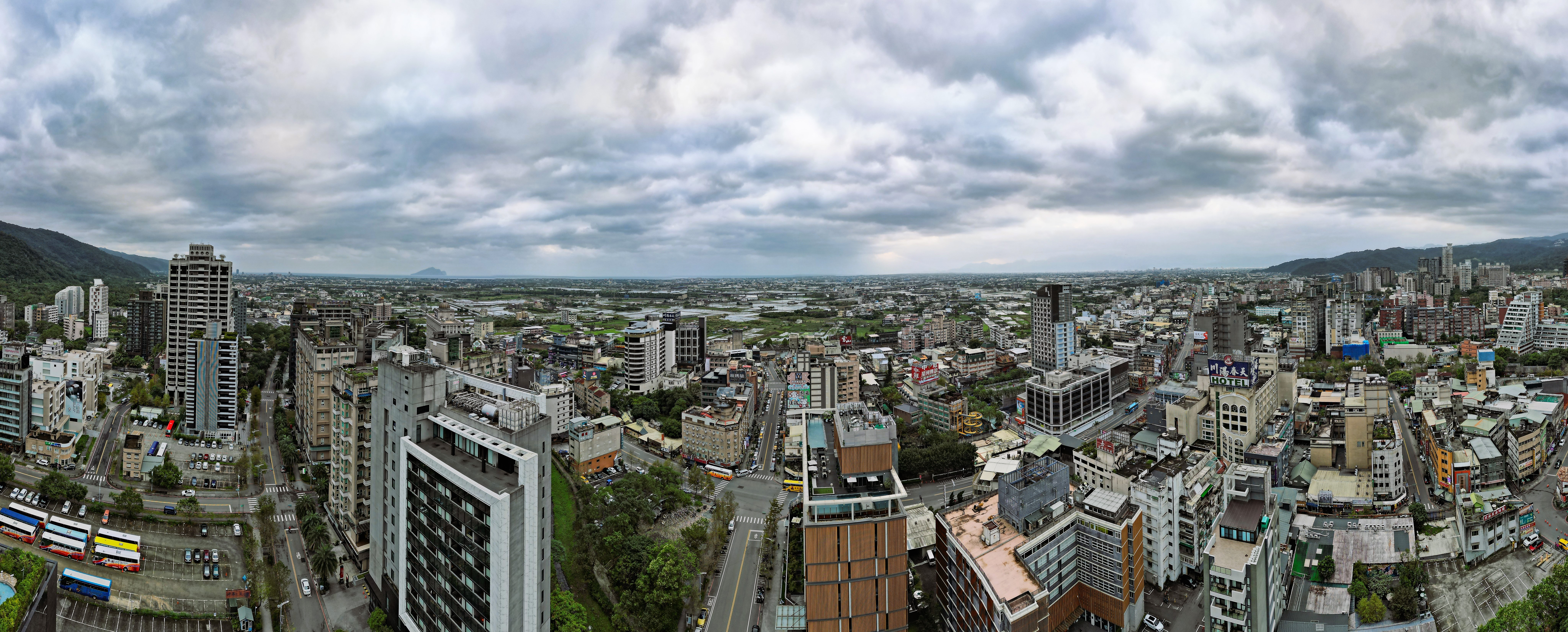
Aerial panorama of Jiaoxi Township

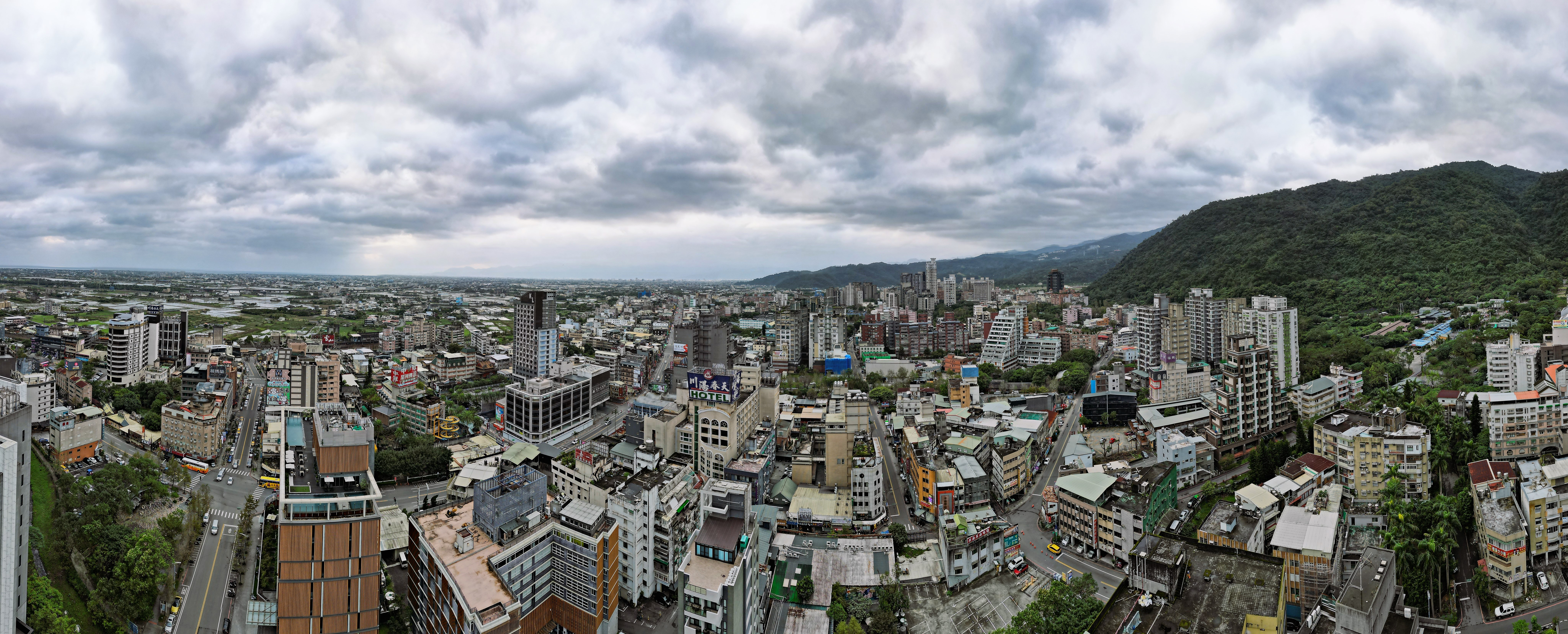
Aerial panorama of Jiaoxi Township - another perspective. December 2022.

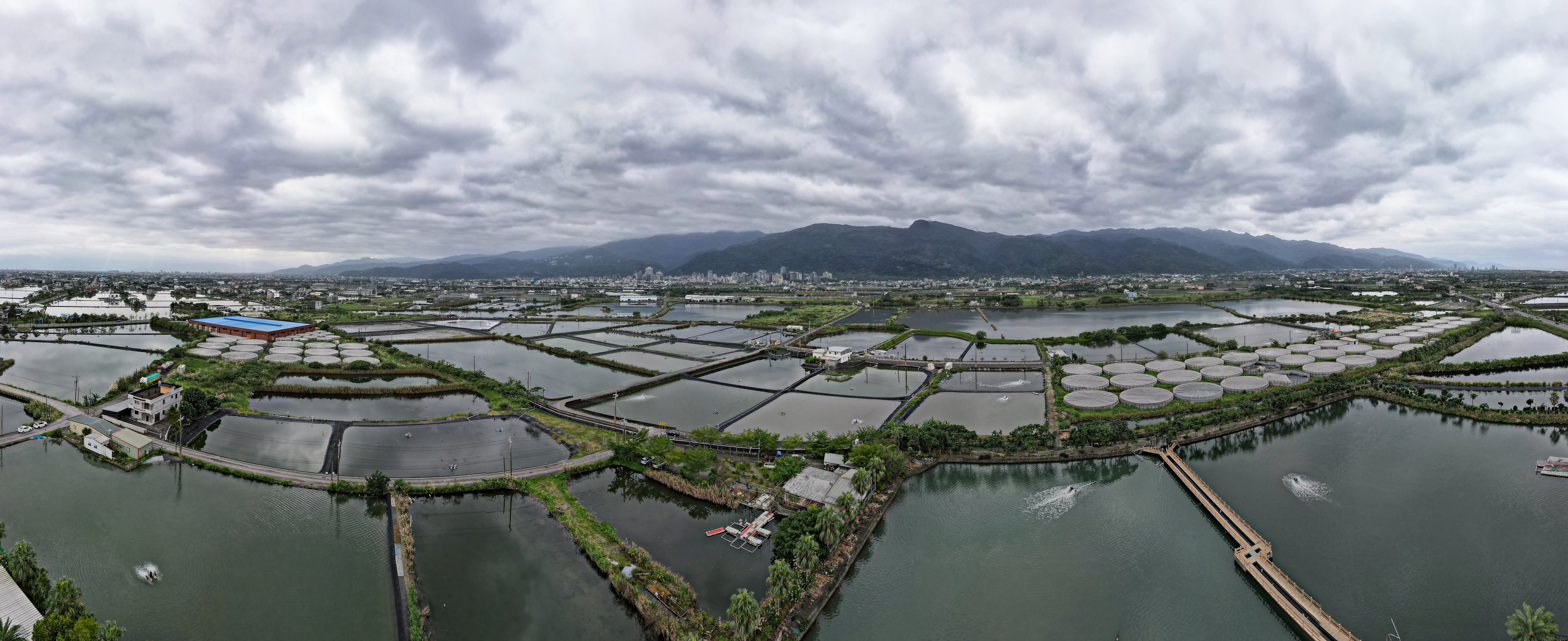
Aerial panorama of the Jiaoxi countryside. December 2022.

Jiaoxi is famous for its hot springs. The industry, as well as associated industries like hospitality, experience noticeable increases in revenue on weekends and holidays during the hot spring season in winter.

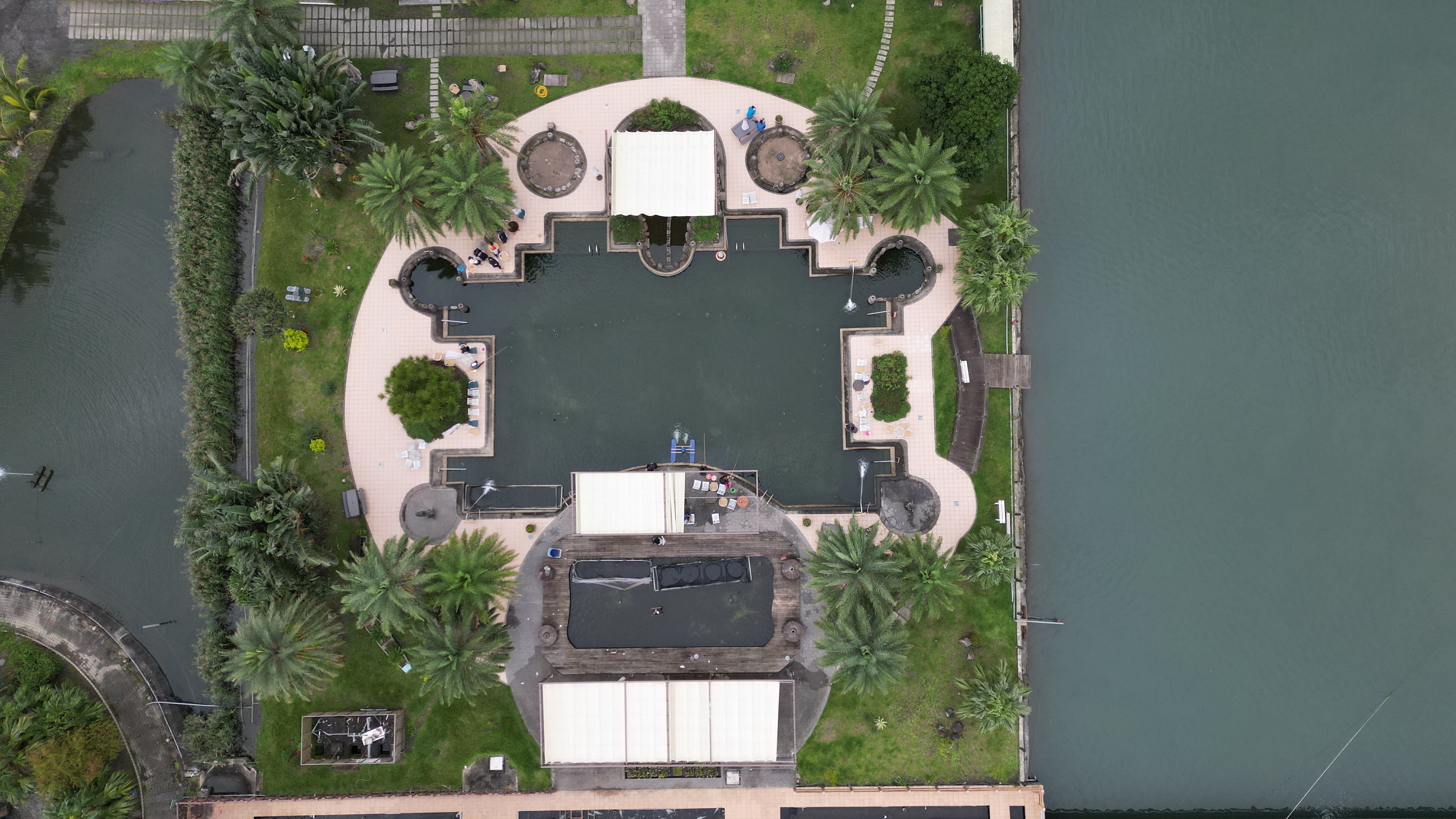
Aerial perspective of a fish farm in Jiaoxi Township in Yilan county. December 2022.

In March 2012, it was named one of the Top 10 Small Tourist Towns by the Tourism Bureau of Taiwan.

Other notable points of interests include:

- Wufengqi Waterfall

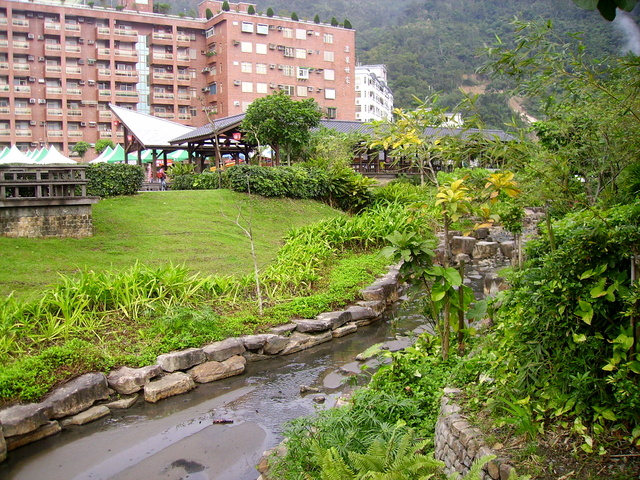
Jiaoxi hot spring

== Events ==
- Jiaoxi Hot Spring Festival

== Transportation ==
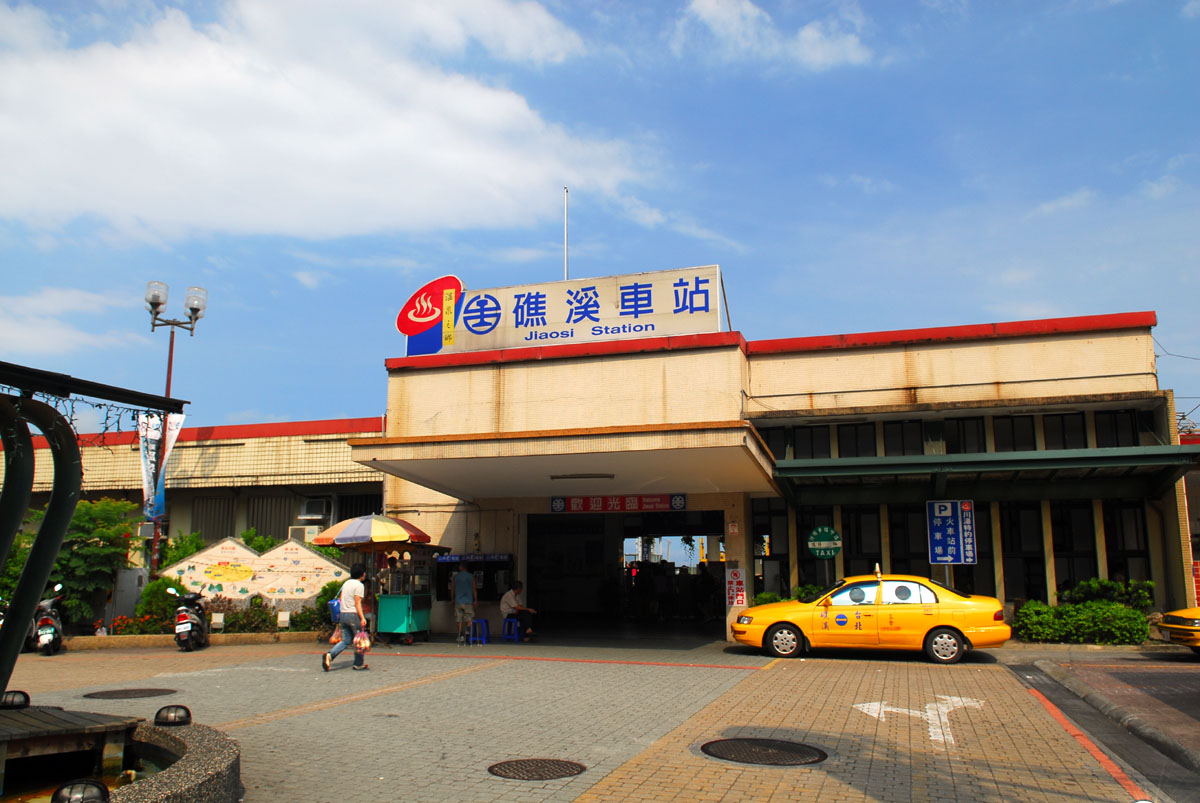
Jiaoxi Station

Jiaoxi is served by Jiaoxi Station on the Yilan Line run by Taiwan Railway. Another convenient way of transportation to/from Taipei and further to Yilan City is by bus route that uses the National Freeway 5 and passes through the Snow Mountain Tunnel. It is operated by Kamalan Bus Inc. and Capital Star (首都之星). The Provincial Highway 9 also serves the township.

== Notable natives ==
- Chang Chuan-tien, member of Legislative Yuan (1999–2006)
- Lai In-jaw, President of Control Yuan (2007–2010)
- Wu Tze-cheng, Minister of Public Construction Commission
