= Ho Sheng-lung =

Taiwanese politician

Ho Sheng-lung (Chinese: 何聖隆; 1954–2015) was a Taiwanese politician.

Ho served on the Keelung City Council for two terms, totaling eight years, before winning a by-election to represent Keelung in the Legislative Yuan. He took office on 26 January 1998, replacing Lee Chin-yung, who had vacated the seat to serve as Mayor of Keelung. Ho left the Third Legislative Yuan on 29 January 1999, two days before its term ended. In 2014, after Huang Ching-tai, Keelung City Council speaker and mayoral candidate, became subject to an investigation, Ho called on the Kuomintang to select another candidate for the Keelung mayoralty, and for Huang to willingly withdraw from the election. Ho died, aged 62, at the Keelung Chang Gung Memorial Hospital on 21 July 2015, where he was seeking treatment for liver cancer.
