= Central Election Commission (Taiwan) =

Taiwanese independent agency in charge of elections

- 中央選舉委員會; Zhōngyāng Xuǎnjǔ Wěiyuánhuì (Taiwanese Mandarin); Tiong-iong Soán-kí Ui-oân-hoē (Taiwanese Hokkien); Tûng-ông Sién-kí Vî-yèn-fi (Taiwanese Hakka)
- Logo

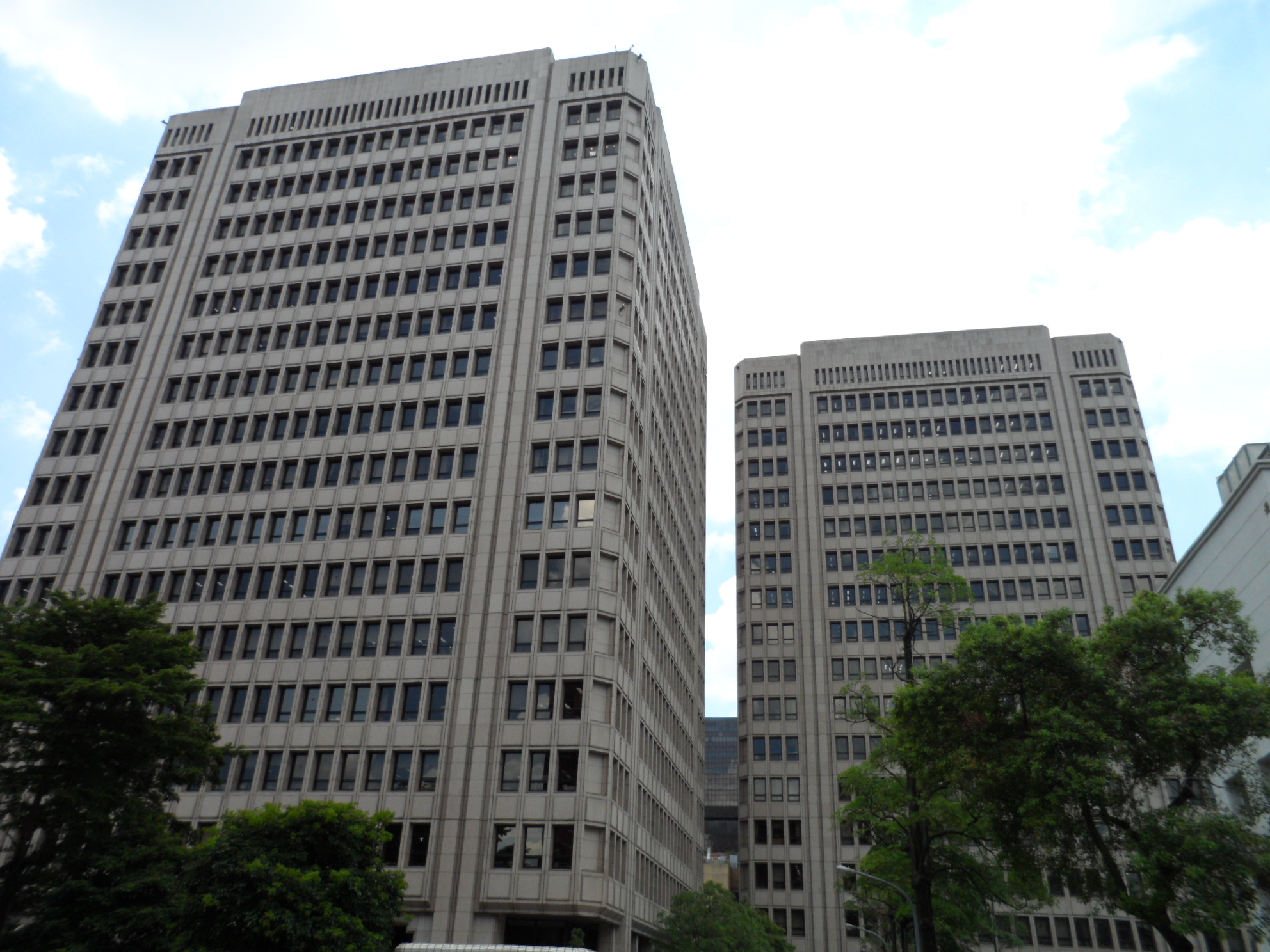

Agency overview
- Formed: 16 July 1980
- Jurisdiction: Taiwan
- Headquarters: Zhongzheng, Taipei
- Agency executive: Michael You, Chairman; Vice Chairperson
- Parent agency: Executive Yuan
- Website: cec.gov.tw

The Central Election Commission (CEC; Chinese: 中央選舉委員會; pinyin: Zhōngyāng Xuǎnjǔ Wěiyuánhuì; Pe̍h-ōe-jī: Tiong-iong Soán-kí Úi-oân-hōe; Pha̍k-fa-sṳ: Tûng-ông Sién-kí Vî-yèn-fi) is the statutory independent agency responsible for managing local and national elections in Taiwan. It is an important agency which carries out elections and enhances the democracy in the country. It is also charged with improving the election legal system, improve the quality of service, reinforce impartiality and independence. There are also local election commissions in all counties, cities, and municipalities. It is headed by the Chairman of commissioners or Chief of Commissioners.

== Functions ==
The functions of the CEC includes:

- Election Announcement
- Candidate Nomination and Registration
- Lot-Drawing for determining the order of candidates
- Campaign Activities
- Public Forums
- Display and Public Releasing Voters’ Lists
- Printing Election Bulletins
- Election Day
- Electee List Announcement
- Awarding Electee Certificates

== Chairpersons ==
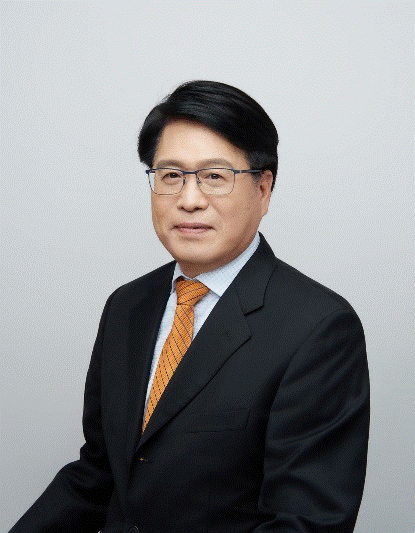
Michael You, the incumbent Chairperson of Central Election Commission

- Chiu Chuang-huan (16 July 1980 – 1 December 1981)
- Lin Yang-kang (1 December 1981 – 1 June 1984)
- Wu Po-hsiung (1 June 1984 – 22 July 1988; first term)
- Hsu Shui-teh (22 July 1988 – 1 June 1991)
- Wu Po-hsiung (1 June 1991 – 30 July 1994; second term)
- George Huang (30 July 1994 – 16 June 1995; first term)
- Huang Kun-huei (16 June 1995 – 10 June 1996)
- Lin Fong-cheng (10 June 1996 – 15 May 1997)
- Yeh Chin-fong (15 May 1997 – 5 February 1998)
- Huang Chu-wen (5 February 1998 – 17 December 1999)
- George Huang (17 December 1999 – 16 June 2004; second term)
- Chang Cheng-hsiung (16 June 2004 – 3 November 2009)
- Rai Hau-min (4 November 2009 – 12 October 2010)
- Liu I-chou (13 October 2010 – 14 November 2010) (acting)
- Chang Po-ya (15 November 2010 – 31 July 2014)
- Liu I-chou (1 August 2014 – 28 January 2015) (acting)
- Liu I-chou (29 January 2015 – 3 November 2017)
- Lin Tzu-ling (4 November 2017 – 16 November 2017) (acting)
- Chen In-chin (17 November 2017 – 3 December 2018)
- Chen Chao-chien (4 December 2018 – 24 February 2019) (acting)
- Lee Chin-yung (25 February 2019 – 3 November 2025)
- Wu Jung-hui (4 November 2025 – 26 April 2026) (acting)
- Michael You (27 April 2026 –) (incumbent)

== See also ==
- Elections in Taiwan
- Politics of Taiwan
- List of political parties in Taiwan
