= Chang Li-shan =

Taiwanese politician (born 1964)

- 張麗善
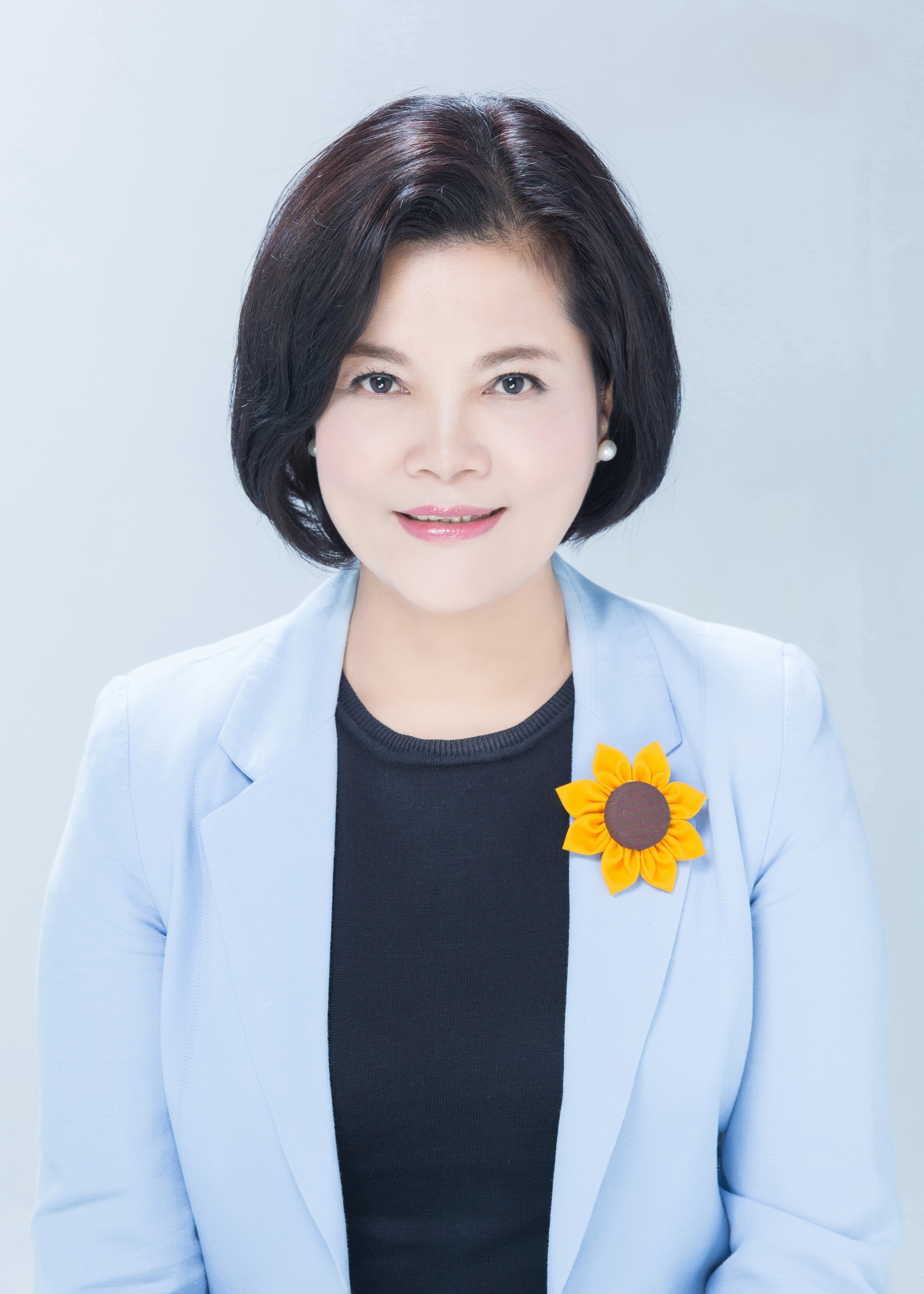
- Official portrait, 2017

11th Magistrate of Yunlin
- Incumbent
- Assumed office 25 December 2018
- Deputy: Xie Shu-ya
- Preceded by: Lee Chin-yung

Member of the Legislative Yuan
- In office 1 February 2016 – 6 November 2018
- Succeeded by: Lin Yi-hua
- Constituency: Party-list
- In office 1 February 2005 – 31 January 2008
- Constituency: Yunlin County

4th Chief Executive of the Yunlin-Chiayi-Tainan Joint Services Center
- In office 29 April 2015 – 31 October 2015
- Secretary General: Chen Bao-ji
- Preceded by: Chien Tai-lang
- Succeeded by: Hsu Gen-wei

Personal details
- Born: 1 January 1964 (age 62) Tuku, Yunlin County, Taiwan
- Party: Kuomintang
- Relatives: Chang Jung-wei (brother); Chang Chia-chun (niece)
- Education: National Formosa University (BS); National Taiwan Normal University (MS)

Chang Li-shan (Chinese: 張麗善; pinyin: Zhāng Lìshàn; Wade–Giles: Chang^{1} Li^{4}-shan^{4}; born 1 January 1964) is a Taiwanese politician. She served on the Legislative Yuan from 2005 to 2008, and again from 2016 to 2018, when she was elected magistrate of Yunlin County.

== Personal life and education ==
Chang Li-shan attended Makuang Elementary School in Tuku, Yunlin, then enrolled at Tuku Junior High School before graduating from Stella Matutina Girls' High School. Chang obtained her degree at National Formosa University and National Taiwan Normal University. Her older brother is Chang Jung-wei. She is married to Chang Yung-cheng.

== Political career ==
=== Legislative Yuan (first term) ===
Chang was elected to the Legislative Yuan in December 2004, as an independent. She won election from Yunlin County handily, with over 51,000 votes supporting her candidacy.

In May 2005, fellow legislator Yin Ling-ying sued Chang for slapping her while the two lawmakers were lobbying the World Health Assembly in Geneva to admit Taiwan as an observer to the body. During her first legislative term, Chang drew attention to the amount of environmental damage facing Yunlin County, compared with the little compensation paid by the industries which cause it. Chang stepped down from the legislature at the end of her term in January 2008, and considered running for the Yunlin County magistracy in the 2009 Taiwanese local elections. Chang secured the support of the Kuomintang's Hsu Shu-po in June 2009, after he had dropped out of the race. In September, Chang suspended her campaign for office, due to disagreements between her brother Chang Jung-wei and Chang Hui-yuan. The Kuomintang struggled to find a replacement candidate, and eventually nominated Wu Wei-chi. Subsequently, the Chang family political faction pulled away from the Kuomintang, and Chang Li-shan became chair of the Taiwan Agricultural Association.

=== 2014 Yunlin County magistrate election ===
The Kuomintang backed Chang Li-shan's 2014 bid for the Yunlin magistracy, necessitating the Chang family's factional and grassroots support.

Chang faced Democratic Progressive Party candidate Lee Chin-yung, and took on the campaign platform "Blue Ocean Yunlin," emphasizing "big service," utilizing technology to form a strong welfare system and empathetic administration. Opinion polls in November 2014 placed Chang slightly ahead of Lee. As election day drew nearer, Jiang Yi-huah and Terry Gou attended Chang's campaign rallies. Chang lost to Lee, winning 175,862 votes, or 43.02%, to Lee's 232,900 votes, a 56.98% vote share.

Yunlin County
No.	Candidate	Party	Votes	Percentage
1	Chang Li-shan	KMT	175,862	43.02%
2	Lee Chin-yung	DPP	232,900	56.98%

=== Legislative Yuan (second term) ===
Chang was nominated by the Kuomintang for a party list seat, and returned to the Legislative Yuan via proportional representation in 2016. In March 2016, she invited premier Chang San-cheng, legislative speaker Su Jia-chyuan, and all lawmakers to bow to a photo of Sun Yat-sen located in the legislative chamber. Su refused to do so, and all other legislators remained seated, leaving both Changs the only participants in the ritual.

In her second legislative term, Chang criticized the ruling Democratic Progressive Party's handling of bills regarding illicit party assets, as well as the Ill-gotten Party Assets Settlement Committee, an agency formed to investigate such assets. She has criticized several DPP agricultural policies, and the Council of Agriculture (COA). Chang opposed the import of pork from the United States containing ractopamine, and called for more public hearings regarding Japanese imports originating from the areas affected by the Fukushima Daiichi nuclear disaster. Chang took issue with the Democratic Progressive Party-led government's 2017 revision of electoral law pertaining to farmers' associations. As the price of bananas fell that year, Chang stated that the COA had not acted adequately to slow overproduction. She observed in November that the COA's announcement of island-wide no-kill animal shelters had led to overcrowding in shelters. Throughout 2017, Chang raised concerns about the environment in Yunlin County, noting specifically that Douliu was struggling to store its waste. She suggested that a renewable energy park slated for construction in Tainan as part of the Forward-looking Infrastructure Development Program should be relocated to Yunlin County, because Yunlin was Taiwan's leading producer in solar energy. During a July 2017 legislative session, in which the special budget for the project was reviewed, Chang targeted Ho Hsin-chun in a physical altercation involving multiple legislators.

=== 2018 Yunlin County magistrate election ===
By February 2018, Chang had been nominated the Kuomintang candidate to contest the Yunlin County magistracy. Chang resigned her legislative seat in early November 2018.

On 24 November 2018, Chang won the Yunlin County magistrate election. She assumed the position on 25 December 2018.

2018 Kuomintang Yunlin County magistrate primary results
Candidates	Place	Result
Chang Li-shan	Called In	Walkover

2018 Yunlin County mayoral results
No.	Candidate	Party	Votes	Percentage
1	Lin Chia-yu (林佳瑜)	Independent	6,163	1.57%
2	Lee Chin-yung	Democratic Progressive Party	163,325	41.72%
3	Wang Li-ping (王麗萍)	Independent	11,261	2.88%
4	Chang Li-shan	Kuomintang	210,770	53.82%
Total voters			565,078	
Valid votes			391,519	
Invalid votes				
Voter turnout			69.29%	

In the aftermath of the African swine fever virus and one day after her inauguration, Chang imposed a ban on using food waste to feed pigs which took immediate effect to contain the spread of the epidemic in the region. As the price of peanuts produced in Yunlin fell in January 2020, Chang called on the Council of Agriculture to aid farmers.
