= Tuku, Yunlin =

Urban township in Yunlin, Taiwan

Coordinates: 23.691062°N 120.362037°E

Tuku Township 土庫鎮
- Urban township
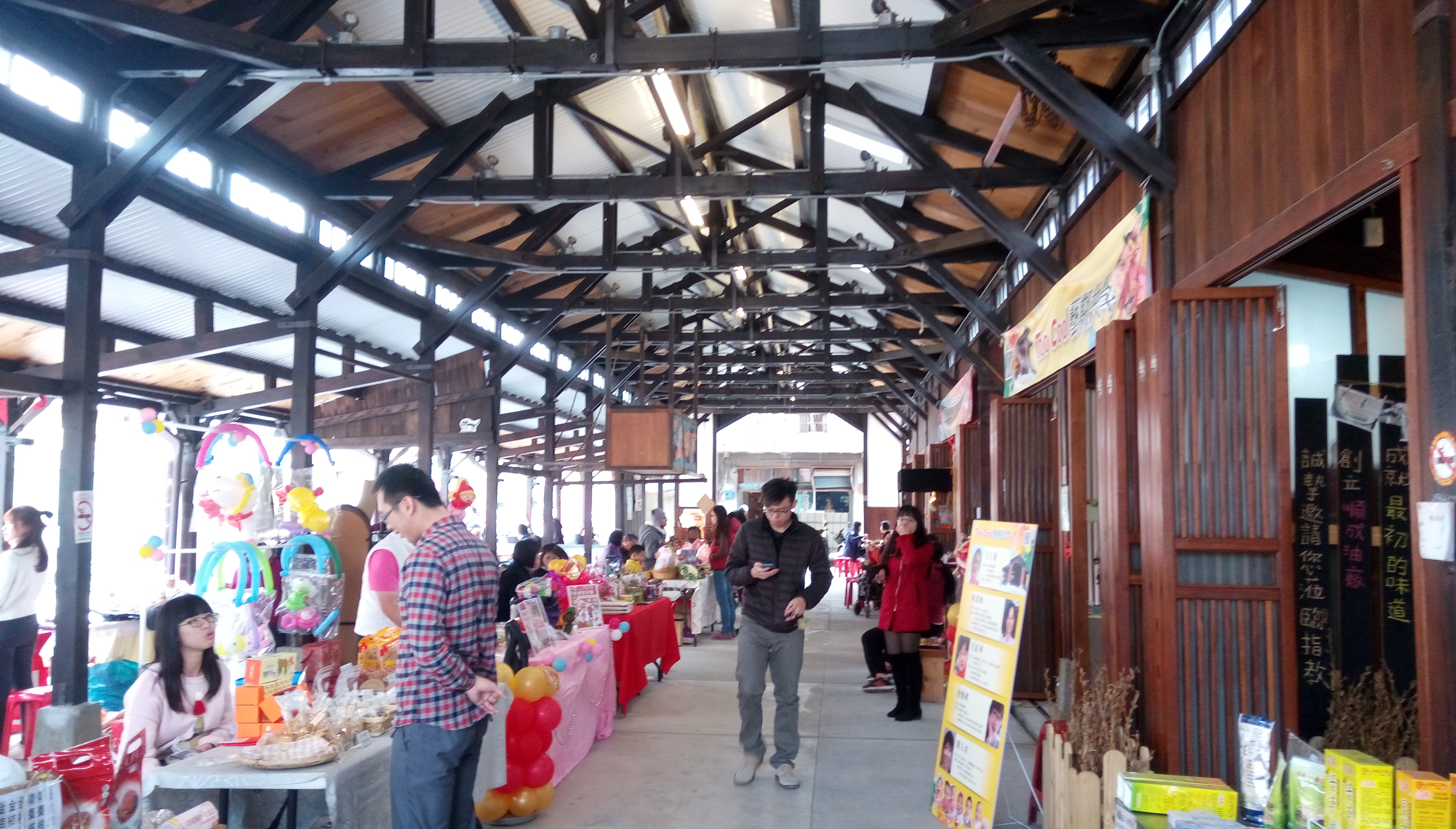
- Market stalls at the renovated Tuku First Market Building

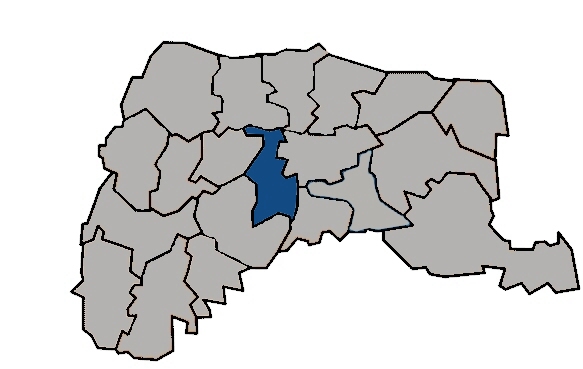
- Tuku Township in Yunlin County
- Location: Yunlin County, Taiwan

Area
  - Total: 49 km^{2} (19 sq mi)

Population (February 2023)
  - Total: 27,662
  - Density: 560/km^{2} (1,500/sq mi)

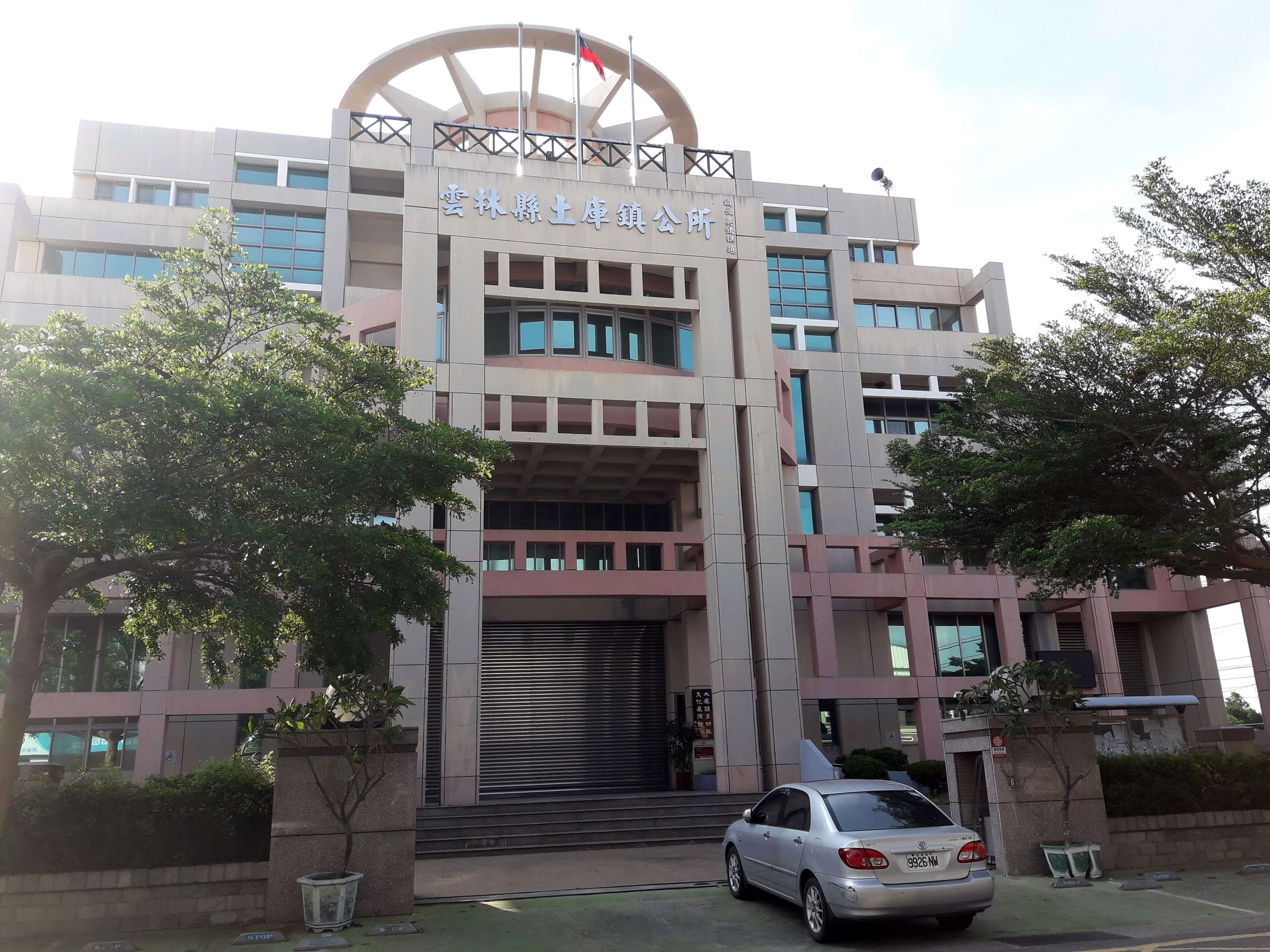
Tuku Township Office

Tuku Township (traditional Chinese: 土庫鎮; simplified Chinese: 土库镇; pinyin: Tǔkù Zhèn) is an urban township in Yunlin County, Taiwan.

== Geography ==
It has a population total of 27,662 and an area of 46 km^{2}.

== Administrative divisions ==
The township comprises 17 villages: Beijiao, Beiping, Dapei, Fenqi, Gongbei, Houpu, Lunnei, Nanping, Shimiao, Shuntian, Tungping, Xibian, Xingxin, Xinzhuang, Xiping, Yuegang and Zhongzheng.

== Tourist attractions ==
- Chungsan Street
- Tuku Night Market

== Notable natives ==
- Chang Li-shan, Magistrate of Yunlin County
