= Lee Chin-yung =

Taiwanese lawyer and politician (born 1951)

- 李進勇
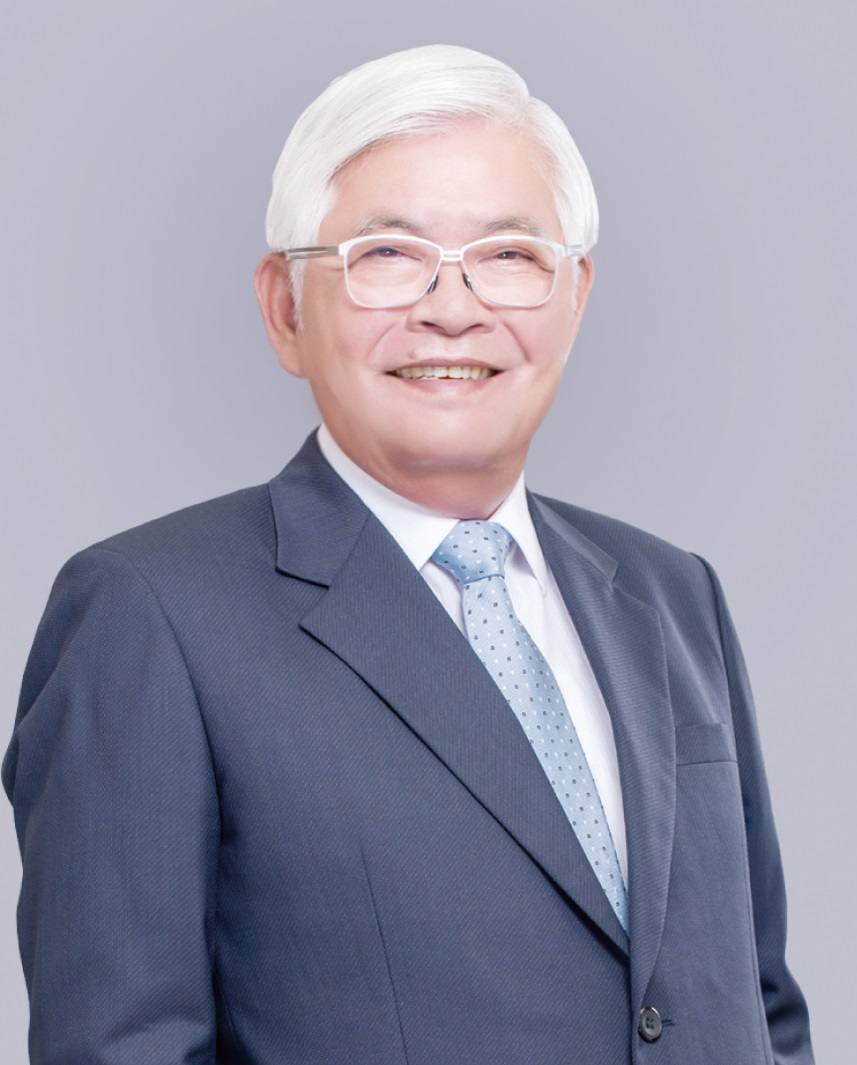
- Official portrait, 2019

6th Chairperson of the Central Election Commission
- In office 25 February 2019 – 3 November 2025
- Prime Minister: Su Tseng-chang; Chen Chien-jen; Cho Jung-tai
- Preceded by: Chen In-chin; Chen Chao-chien (acting)
- Succeeded by: Wu Jung-hui (acting); Michael You

10th Magistrate of Yunlin
- In office 25 December 2014 – 25 December 2018
- Preceded by: Su Chih-fen
- Succeeded by: Chang Li-shan
- Acting; 22 March 2005 – 20 December 2005
- Preceded by: Chang Jung-wei
- Succeeded by: Su Chih-fen

7th Mayor of Keelung
- In office 20 December 1997 – 20 December 2001
- Preceded by: Lin Shui-mu
- Succeeded by: Hsu Tsai-li

Member of the Legislative Yuan
- In office 1 February 1993 – 20 December 1997
- Succeeded by: Ho Sheng-lung
- Constituency: Keelung

Personal details
- Born: 1 August 1951 (age 75) Sihu, Yunlin, Taiwan
- Party: Independent (since 2019)
- Other political affiliations: Democratic Progressive Party (until 2019) (Note: Membership suspended during the tenure as the chairperson of the Central Election Commission.)
- Education: National Chung Hsing University (LLB); National Taiwan University (LLM)

Lee Chin-yung (Chinese: 李進勇; pinyin: Lǐ Jìnyǒng; born 1 August 1951) is a Taiwanese lawyer and politician. He was a member of the Legislative Yuan from 1993 to 1997, when he was elected Mayor of Keelung. Lee remained mayor until 2001. He served as acting Yunlin County magistrate in 2005, and later served a full term in the office between 2014 and 2018. Following an unsuccessful bid for reelection as Yunlin County magistrate, Lee was appointed chairman of the Central Election Commission in 2019.

== Education ==
Lee attended law school at National Chung Hsing University, where he graduated with a Bachelor of Laws (LL.B.) in 1975. He then earned a Master of Laws (LL.M.) from National Taiwan University in 1979.

== Early political career ==
Lee was a judge on the Hualien, Yilan and Taichung district courts, prior to sitting on the Legislative Yuan from 1993 to 1997 as a representative of Keelung, followed by a single term as mayor of Keelung. Lee's victory in the 1997 Keelung mayoral election was later credited to a split in the Pan-Blue Coalition.

=== 2001 Keelung City mayoralty election ===
Lee ran for reelection as Mayor of Keelung in 2001 under the Democratic Progressive Party banner. However, he lost to Kuomintang candidate Hsu Tsai-li.

2001 Keelung City Mayoralty Election Result
No.	Candidate	Party	Votes
1	Hsu Tsai-li	KMT	100,070
2	Lee Chin-yung	DPP	72,212

Subsequently, Lee served in successive vice ministerial posts within the Ministry of the Interior and Public Construction Commission. This was followed by an appointment as acting Yunlin County Magistrate in 2005. Later, he returned to the Executive Yuan as vice minister within the Ministry of Justice, and Ministry of Transportation and Communications.

== Magistrate of Yunlin County ==
=== 2014 Yunlin County magistrate election ===
Lin represented the Democratic Progressive Party and won the 2014 Yunlin County magistrate election held on 29 November 2014.

2014 Yunlin County Magistrate Election Result
No.	Candidate	Party	Votes	Percentage
1	Chang Li-shan	KMT	175,862	43.02%
2	Lee Chin-yung	DPP	232,900	56.98%

=== 2018 Yunlin County magistrate election ===
2018 Democratic Progressive Party Yunlin County magistrate primary results
Candidates	Place	Result
Lee Chin-yung	Nominated	Walkover

2018 Yunlin County mayoral results
No.	Candidate	Party	Votes	Percentage
1	Lin Chia-yu (林佳瑜)	Independent	6,163	1.57%
2	Lee Chin-yung	DPP	163,325	41.72%
3	Wang Li-ping (王麗萍)	Independent	11,261	2.88%
4	Chang Li-shan	KMT	210,770	53.82%
Total voters			565,078	
Valid votes			391,519	
Invalid votes				
Voter turnout			69.29%	

== Later political career ==
Lee was nominated to the chairmanship of the Central Election Commission (CEC) in February 2019. Following his nomination, he left the Democratic Progressive Party in an effort to remain neutral while leading the CEC. The Legislative Yuan voted on 28 May 2019 to approve Lee's nomination to the Central Election Commission. Lee's nomination for a second term was approved in October 2021.
