= Su Chih-fen =

Taiwanese politician (born 1953)

- 蘇治芬
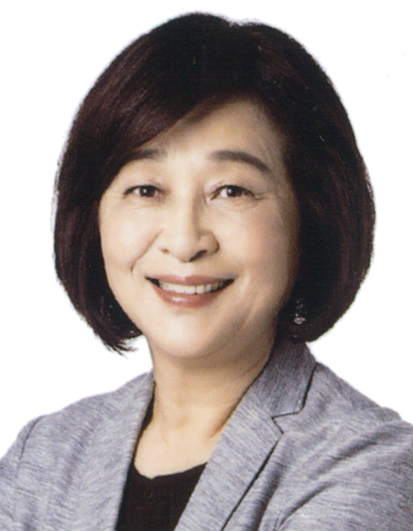
- Official portrait, 2016

Chairperson of the National Animal Industry Foundation (NAIF)
- Incumbent
- Assumed office 2024

Member of the Legislative Yuan
- In office 1 February 2016 – 31 January 2024
- Preceded by: Chang Chia-chun
- Succeeded by: Ding Hsueh-chung
- Constituency: Yunlin County 1

Member of the Legislative Yuan
- In office 1 February 2002 – 20 December 2005
- Constituency: Yunlin County

9th Magistrate of Yunlin
- In office 20 December 2005 – 25 December 2014
- Preceded by: Lee Chin-yung (acting)
- Succeeded by: Lee Chin-yung

Personal details
- Born: 10 July 1953 (age 73) Beigang, Yunlin, Taiwan
- Party: Democratic Progressive Party
- Education: Commercial and Vocational School of Taipei City; Treasury and Financial Department of Tainan Technical College for Women

Su Chih-fen (Chinese: 蘇治芬; pinyin: Sū Zhìfēn; born 10 July 1953) is a Taiwanese politician. She was the magistrate of Yunlin County from 20 December 2005 until 25 December 2014. She is the chairperson of the National Animal Industry Foundation (NAIF).

== Yunlin County Magistrate ==
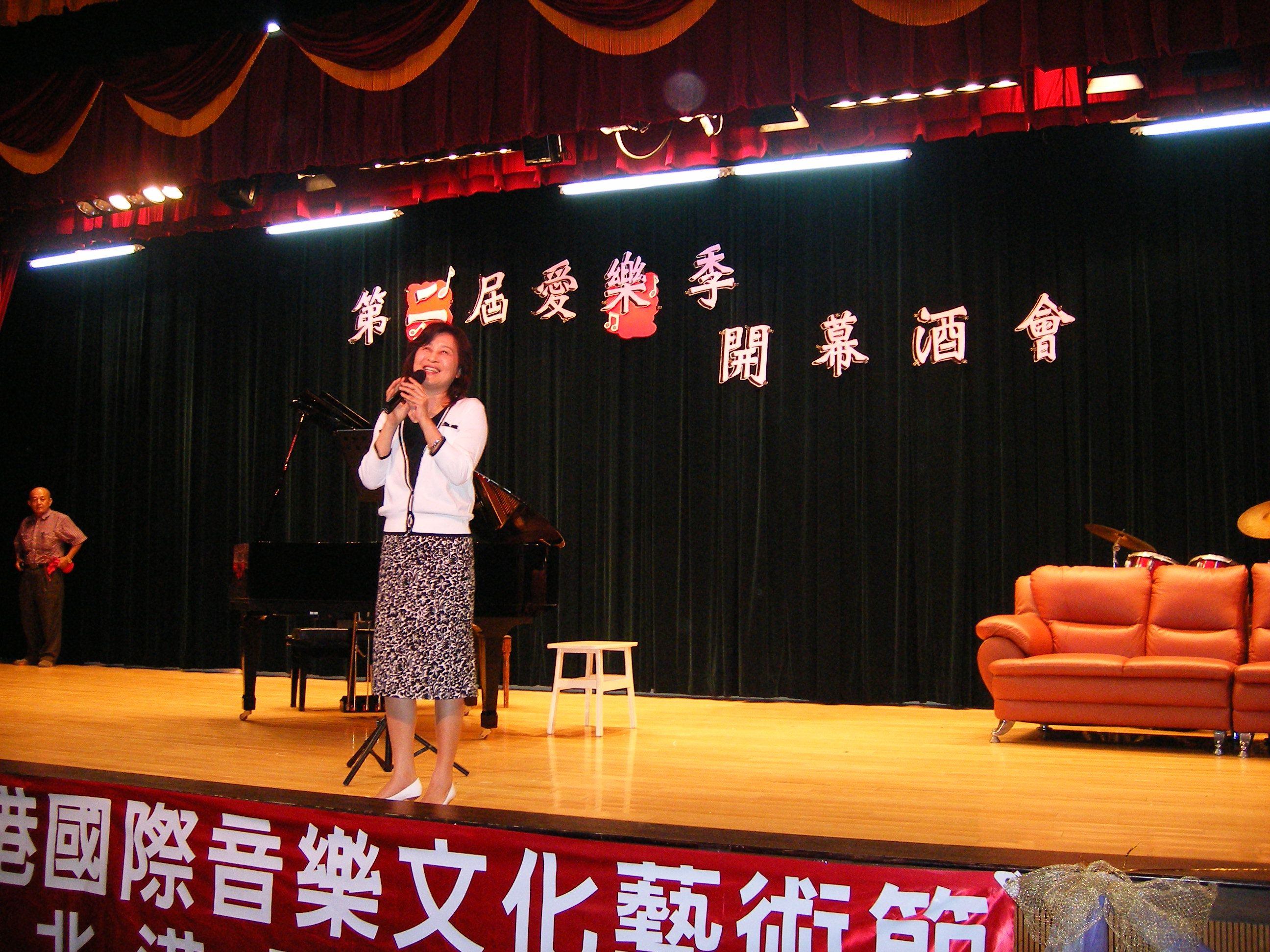
Su Chih-fen at the opening ceremony of the first Beigang International Music Festival in 2006.

=== Yunlin County Magistrate election ===
Su was elected as the Magistrate of Yunlin County after winning the 2005 Republic of China local election under Democratic Progressive Party on 3 December 2005 and assumed office on 20 December 2005. She secured her second term as the magistrate after winning the 2009 Republic of China local election on 5 December 2009 and assumed her second-term office on 20 December 2009.

=== Landfill approval project bribery ===
During her term as the Yunlin County Commissioner, Su was arrested on 3 November 2008 on the charge of accepting bribes to the worth NT$5 million, equivalent to US$174,845.00, in a landfill approval case and was under prosecution for a 15-year jail sentence. Known for her great integrity, the news of her arrest triggered off a widespread public outrage. The court, however, ruled out her case and returned the verdict as not guilty.

=== 2013 cross-strait service trade agreement ===
Commenting on the Cross-Strait Service Trade Agreement signed between Straits Exchange Foundation (SEF) and Association for Relations Across the Taiwan Straits (ARATS) in Shanghai on 21 June 2013, Su said that she refused to recognize the agreement and implement it in Yunlin County.
