= Fo Guang University =

Private university in Taiwan

Coordinates: 24.8166°N 121.7276°E

- 佛光大學 (Chinese)
- Motto: 義正道慈(Pe̍h-ōe-jī: Gī-chèng Tō-chû)
- Type: Private
- Established: 2000
- Religious affiliation: Buddhism (Fo Guang Shan)
- President: Yang Chao-hsiang
- Academic staff: 88 (full time), 126 (joint and adjunct)
- Undergraduates: 955
- Postgraduates: 1,168
- Location: Jiaoxi, Taiwan
- Campus: Rural, 57 ha (140 acres)
- Website: www.fgu.edu.tw

Chinese name
- Simplified Chinese: 佛光大学
- Traditional Chinese: 佛光大學
Transcriptions
Standard Mandarin
- Hanyu Pinyin: Fóguāng Dàxué
Southern Min
- Hokkien POJ: Hu̍t-kong Tāi-ha̍k

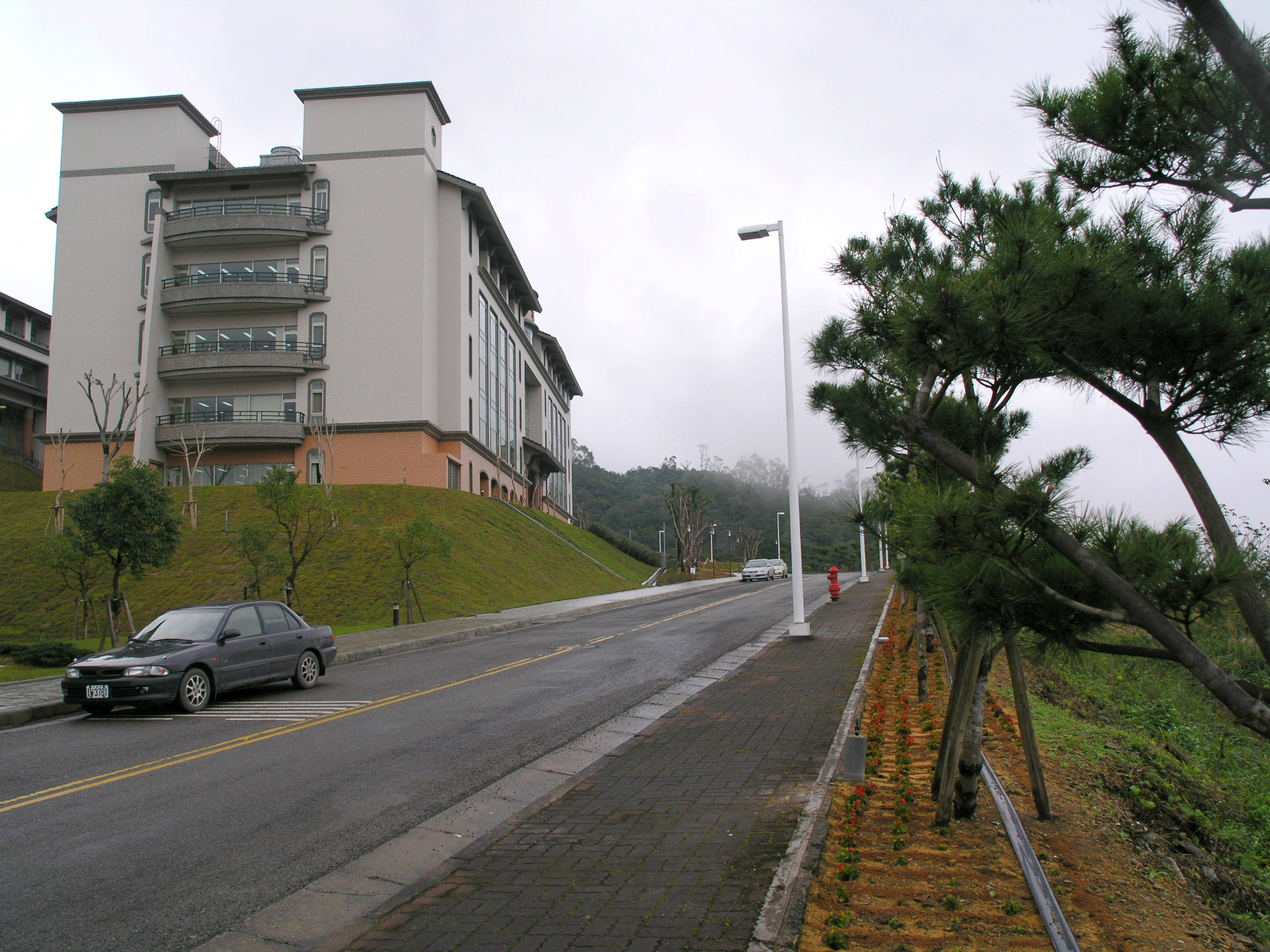
Fo Guang University

Fo Guang University (FGU; Chinese: 佛光大學; lit. Buddha's Light University) is a private university in Linmei Village, Jiaoxi, Yilan County, Taiwan.

== History ==
It was founded by the Chinese Mahāyāna Buddhist monastic order Fo Guang Shan in 2000 and as such represents the culmination of education efforts of the order that started in 1963 with establishing Chinese Buddhist Research Institute at Fo Guang Shan.

A gradual approach was adopted in developing the campus as a part of a plan for the overall area. The Ministry of Education granted approval on July 20, 2000, and the school formally opened in September that year. The Schools of Humanities and Sociology were the first to be founded during the initial phase of establishment. By introducing the undergraduate and postgraduate level of education, Fo Guang University is gradually developing into a full-rounded university. Currently, it comprises the College of Arts and Humanities, College of Social Sciences and Management, College of Technology, and College of Buddhist Studies. All programs are taught in Mandarin Chinese, with the exception of the MA program in Buddhist Studies, which has both Chinese and English tracks. As of the 2012-2013 academic year, its total enrollment is 3,400 students, including undergraduate and graduate students. The university library holds more than 253,000 volumes.

== Features ==
The university is the first in Taiwan to fully comply with Taiwan Environmental Impact Assessment Act standards while completing the development of a mountain slope campus. Begun in 1996, the project involved major changes to the slope, but every effort was made to keep the impact on the natural environment to a minimum during the construction process. The results of efforts at the time are already evident - eagles, monkeys, bamboo partridges, raccoons and other fauna can still be spotted on campus right now, especially the nationally protected Formosan blue magpie.

Solar panels and wind turbines are located next to the outdoor performance arena. Both are still being tested for how much electricity they can supply in order to assess whether they can provide a portion of the electricity for lighting the facility. These two generating sources now provide spectacular lighting at night, adding considerably to the luster of the campus.

== See also ==
- Fo Guang Shan
- List of universities in Taiwan
