= Chang Cheng-hsiung =

Taiwanese lawyer (born 1941)

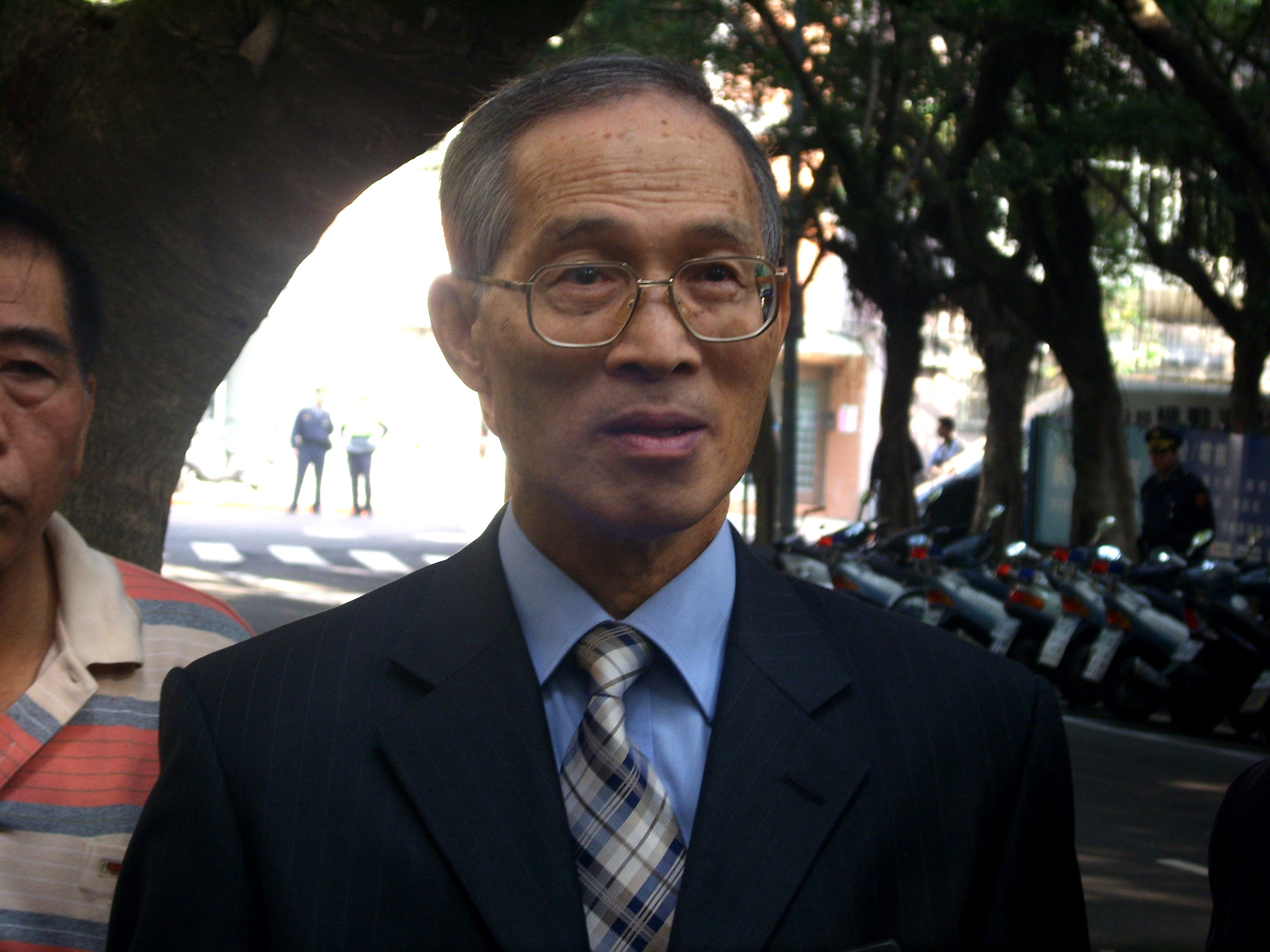
Chang on 12 January 2008

Chang Cheng-hsiung (Chinese: 張政雄; born 24 November 1941) is a Taiwanese lawyer who chaired the Central Election Commission from 2004 to 2009.

== Education and career ==
After graduating from Taipei Municipal Chien Kuo High School, Chang studied law at National Taiwan University and earned his Bachelor of Laws (LL.B.) there.

Prior to his appointment as chair of the Central Election Commission, Chang had practiced law for 37 years. He served as legal counsel for dissidents arrested during the Kaohsiung Incident of 1979. Chang has also served on the board of China Aviation Development Foundation.

Chang was nominated to the chairmanship of the Central Election Commission in June 2004. In June 2007, Kuomintang legislators criticized Chang for scheduling elections for the seventh Legislative Yuan on 12 January 2008. The 2008 Taiwanese transitional justice referendum was scheduled for the same date, and local governments affiliated with the Pan-Blue Coalition announced that voters within their jurisdiction would use two-step voting, in which legislative ballots and referendum ballots were obtained and cast separately, instead of one-step voting mandated by the Central Election Commission, in which voters would receive and cast legislative and referendum ballots at the same time. Chang spoke out against the Kuomintang's decision, and stated that ballots cast via two-step voting would be ruled invalid. Chang later stated in December 2007 that voters could receive ballots separately if, during the voting process, they did not leave the polling place. Chang stepped down from the Central Election Commission in November 2009, expressing concern that a new commission was to be sworn in a month before local elections, despite the fact that the terms of outgoing members would not expire until June 2010.
