= Liu I-chou =

Taiwanese lawyer and political scientist (1948–2026)

- 劉義周
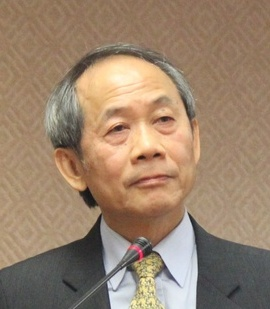
- Liu in 2015

Chairperson of Central Election Commission of the Republic of China
- In office 29 January 2015 – 3 November 2017
- Succeeded by: Chen In-chin
- In office 1 August 2014 – 28 January 2015 (acting)
- Preceded by: Chang Po-ya

Vice Chairperson of Central Election Commission of the Republic of China
- In office 2009 – 31 July 2014
- Chairperson: Chang Po-ya

Personal details
- Born: 12 April 1948
- Died: 23 August 2026 (aged 78)
- Education: National Chengchi University (LLB, LLM); University of Michigan (PhD)

Liu I-chou (Chinese: 劉義周; pinyin: Liú Yìzhōu; 12 April 1948 – 23 August 2026) was a Taiwanese lawyer and political scientist. He was the acting chairperson and subsequently the chairperson of the Central Election Commission (CEC) of the Republic of China since 1 August 2014 until 3 November 2017.

== Education ==
Liu graduated from National Chengchi University with a bachelor's degree and a master's degree in law in 1973 and 1977, respectively. He completed doctoral studies in the United States, earning his Ph.D. in political science from the University of Michigan in 1990 under political science professors Gregory B. Markus and Samuel J. Eldersveld. His doctoral dissertation, completed at the Rackham Graduate School, was titled, "The electoral effect of social context control on voters: The case of Taipei, Taiwan".

== Central Election Commission ==
Liu served as the vice chairperson of the CEC from 2009 until 2014, when he became the acting chairperson of the commission after the former chairperson, Chang Po-ya, resigned from the position to take the position of the president of Control Yuan. He was then officially appointed the chairperson on 29 January 2015.

== Death ==
Liu died on 23 August 2026, at the age of 78.

== See also ==
- Executive Yuan
- Elections in the Republic of China
