= List of county magistrates of Yunlin =

The magistrate of Yunlin County is the chief executive of the government of Yunlin County. This list includes directly elected magistrates of the county. The incumbent Magistrate is Chang Li-shan of Kuomintang since 25 December 2018.

== Directly elected County Magistrates ==
Kuomintang Independent Democratic Progressive Party

№	Portrait	Name (Birth–Death)	Term of Office		Term	Political Party
1		Wu Ching-hui 吳景徽; Wú Jǐnghuī	1 February 1951	2 June 1954	1	Kuomintang
1		Wu Ching-hui 吳景徽; Wú Jǐnghuī	2 June 1954	2 June 1957	2	Kuomintang
2		Lin Chin-sheng 林金生; Lín Jīnshēng (1916-2001)	2 June 1957	2 June 1960	3	Kuomintang
2		Lin Chin-sheng 林金生; Lín Jīnshēng (1916-2001)	2 June 1960	2 June 1964	4	Kuomintang
3		Liao Chen-hsiang 廖禎祥; Liào Zhēnxiáng	2 June 1964	2 June 1968	5	Kuomintang
3		Liao Chen-hsiang 廖禎祥; Liào Zhēnxiáng	2 June 1968	1 February 1973	6	Kuomintang
4		Lin Heng-sheng 林恆生; Lín Héngshēng (1925-2015)	1 February 1973	20 December 1977	7	Kuomintang
4		Lin Heng-sheng 林恆生; Lín Héngshēng (1925-2015)	20 December 1977	20 December 1981	8	Kuomintang
5		Hsu Wen-tsu 許文志; Xǔ Wénzhì (1936-)	20 December 1981	30 May 1985	9	Kuomintang
5		Hsu Wen-tsu 許文志; Xǔ Wénzhì (1936-)	20 December 1985	20 December 1989	10	Kuomintang
6		Liao Chuan-yu 廖泉裕; Liào Quányù (1938–2008)	20 December 1989	20 December 1993	11	Kuomintang
6		Liao Chuan-yu 廖泉裕; Liào Quányù (1938–2008)	20 December 1993	20 December 1997	12	Kuomintang
7		Su Wen-hsiung 蘇文雄; Sū Wénxióng (1943-1999)	20 December 1997	12 August 1999	13	Kuomintang
–		Lee Hsueh-tsung 李學聰; Lǐ Xuécōng	12 August 1999	6 November 1999	13	Kuomintang
		Chang Jung-wei 張榮味; Zhāng Róngwèi (1957-)	6 November 1999	20 December 2001	13	Independent
8		Chang Jung-wei 張榮味; Zhāng Róngwèi (1957-)	6 November 1999	20 December 2001	13	Kuomintang
8		Chang Jung-wei 張榮味; Zhāng Róngwèi (1957-)	20 December 2001	22 March 2005	14	Kuomintang
		Chang Jung-wei 張榮味; Zhāng Róngwèi (1957-)	20 December 2001	22 March 2005	14	Independent
–		Lee Chin-yung 李進勇; Lĭ Jìnyǒng (1951-)	22 March 2005	20 December 2005	14	Democratic Progressive Party
9		Su Chih-fen 蘇治芬; Sū Zhìfēn (1953-)	20 December 2005	4 November 2008	15	Democratic Progressive Party
–		Lee Ying-yuan 李應元; Lǐ Yìngyuán (1953-2021)	5 November 2008	17 November 2008	15	Democratic Progressive Party
9		Su Chih-fen 蘇治芬; Sū Zhìfēn (1953-)	17 November 2008	20 December 2009	15	Democratic Progressive Party
9		Su Chih-fen 蘇治芬; Sū Zhìfēn (1953-)	20 December 2009	25 December 2014	16	Democratic Progressive Party
10		Lee Chin-yung 李進勇; Lĭ Jìnyǒng (1951-)	25 December 2014	25 December 2018	17	Democratic Progressive Party
11		Chang Li-shan 張麗善; Zhāng Lìshàn (1964-)	25 December 2018	25 December 2022	18	Kuomintang
11		Chang Li-shan 張麗善; Zhāng Lìshàn (1964-)	25 December 2022	Incumbent	19	Kuomintang

== See also ==
- Yunlin County Government
