= National Ilan University =

Public university in Taiwan

Coordinates: 24.7474°N 121.7476°E

- 國立宜蘭大學
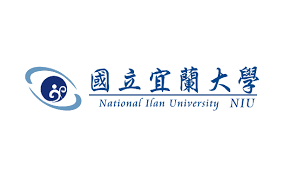
- Motto: 篤學, 力行, 敬業, 樂群; Tok-ha̍k, le̍k-hêng, kèng-gia̍p, lo̍k-kûn
- Motto in English: Studying diligently, practicing with earnestness, developing a respectful attitude toward professionalism
- Type: Public National
- Established: 12 May 1926 (reformed in 2003)
- President: Dr. Po‐Ching Wu (吳柏青)
- Academic staff: 235
- Undergraduates: 4420
- Postgraduates: 482
- Location: Yilan City, Yilan County, Taiwan
- Website: www.niu.edu.tw

National Ilan University
- Traditional Chinese: 國立宜蘭大學
- Simplified Chinese: 国立宜兰大学
Transcriptions
Standard Mandarin
- Hanyu Pinyin: Guólì Yilán Dàxué
Southern Min
- Hokkien POJ: Kok-li̍p Gî-lân Tāi-ha̍k

The National Ilan University (NIU; Chinese: 國立宜蘭大學; Pe̍h-ōe-jī: Kok-li̍p Gî-lân Tāi-ha̍k) is a public university in Yilan City, Yilan County, Taiwan.

== History ==
National Ilan University was one of the first institutions of higher education in Taiwan. It was founded as the Taiwan Provincial Ilan School of Agriculture and Forestry on 12 May 1926. Since then, the name and focus of the institution have undergone a number of changes, from having been a five-year junior college (National Ilan Junior College of Agriculture and Technology), and a polytechnic college (National Ilan Institute of Technology). In 2003, the school was further reformed into its current status as a comprehensive university, offering BA, BS, MA and MS degrees in four colleges.

=== President ===
Dr. Po-Ching Wu was elected as the 5th NIU President by the NIU President Election Committee on July 4 and was on board from August 1, 2016. Dr. Wu is also a professor in the Department of Biomechatronic Engineering at NIU. He received his PhD in Food engineering at the University of Massachusetts (USA).

== Campus ==
The main 15.3-hectare (38-acre) campus stands in the center of Yilan City. The school owns two larger tracts of land, mostly undeveloped, in Yilan City and Wujie Township in Yilan County.

== Ranking ==
National Ilan University rankings

Global – Overall
- THE World: 1501+ (2024)

Regional – Overall
- QS Asia: 701–750 (2025)
- THE Asia: 601+ (2024)

National – Overall
- THE National: 35–45 (2024)

=== Schools ===
NIU has four colleges: Humanities and Management, Engineering, Bioresources, and Electrical Engineering and Computer Science. In addition, there are 13 departments and 17 graduate institutions.

The newest of the Graduate Programs is the MA Program in Foreign Languages & Literatures. It focuses on the literature in English of nations within the Asian Pacific Rim region.

=== University resources ===
The university has 150 laboratories, one computer center, a number of computerized language labs, and an Analysis and Technology Consulting Center which cooperates with local industries on their manufacturing and production. In 2006, the university also established an Incubator Center, which assists local industries in research and development. In addition to the aforementioned facilities and resources, NIU also has a library that occupies nearly 1.7 ha (4.2 acres) and holds over 200,000 books, including nearly 1000 periodicals relating to various research fields. In early 2006, NIU was granted the capacity to serve as the GigaPoP ("gigabit point-of-presence") for Taiwan Advanced Research & Education Network (TWAREN). As a result, NIU is in charge of providing a high-bandwidth network connection to research and academic institutes within Ilan county.

=== Programs for international students ===
College	Department	Bachelor	Master	Ph.D.
College of Humanities and Management	Department of Foreign Languages and Literature*	●	●	
College of Humanities and Management	Department of Applied Economics and Management	●	●	
College of Humanities and Management	Department of Leisure Industry and Health Promotion	●		
College of Engineering	Department of Civil Engineering*	●	●	
College of Engineering	Department of Environmental Engineering	●	●	
College of Engineering	Department of Chemical and Materials Engineering*	●	●	
College of Engineering	Department of Mechanical and Electro-Mechanical Engineering*	●	●	
College of Engineering	Graduate Institute of Architecture and Sustainable Planning		●	
College of Bioresources	Department of Horticulture	●	●	
College of Bioresources	Department of Food Science	●	●	
College of Bioresources	Department of Biomechatronic Engineering	●	●	
College of Bioresources	Department of Forestry and Natural Resources*	●	●	
College of Bioresources	Department of Biotechnology and Animal Science*	●	●	●
College of Electrical Engineering and Computer Science	Department of Electrical Engineering*	●	●	
College of Electrical Engineering and Computer Science	Department of Electronic Engineering*	●	●	
College of Electrical Engineering and Computer Science	Department of Computer Science and Information Engineering*	●	●	

Most programs are taught in Chinese. * Some master's-level courses are taught in English language

1. NIU is one of the Bioresources education and research institutes in Taiwan. NIU students in the Bioresources College have an opportunity to visit Malaysia for off-site classes; and to visit Canada to attend the joint program with University of British Columbia.
2. College of Engineering and College of Electrical Engineering and Computer Science of NIU are IEET accredited. IEET is a member of Washington Accord, Seoul Accord, Sydney Accord, and NABEEA.

=== International Collaboration ===
National Ilan University (NIU) collaborates with over 100 Universities and Research Institutions worldwide. When studying at NIU, students can apply for an academic exchange program with partner universities where they can take part in overseas volunteer activities and summer camps. In addition, NIU has a program with the University of Michigan Dearborn Business School, which offers a master's degree to NIU students.

Area	Asia	American	Europe	Oceania	Total
Number of Partner Universities	83	13	4	2	102

It is also an international sister school of UC Davis, University of Maryland, China Agricultural University, Kasetsart University and Nong Lam University - Ho Chi Minh City (NLU).

=== Tuition and miscellaneous fees ===
Tuition fees and other miscellaneous fees for international students for the academic year 2016.

College	Undergraduate	Graduate
College of Humanities and Management	NT$38,600	NT$37,300
College of Engineering	NT$44,400	NT$45,390
College of Bioresources	NT$49,500	NT$44,000
College of Electrical Engineering and Computer Science	NT$44,400	NT$45,390

Note: For details about Tuition Fees & other Miscellaneous fees for 「 Taiwan Scholarship Awardee」, follow the link

=== Laboratory ===
- Mobility Network Laboratory

== Nomenclature ==
The Ilan spelling in the school name perpetuates a twentieth-century romanization for the name of the area. Yilan is now preferred by most national and regional authorities.

The standard abbreviated reference in English is the acronym NIU. The standard abbreviation in Mandarin Chinese is the portmanteau 宜大 Yi1 Da4. For this reason the romanization "Yida" is often encountered in place names associated with the campus.

== See also ==
- List of universities in Taiwan
