= Yunlin County Council =

Legislature of Yunlin County, Taiwan

Coordinates: 23.6963°N 120.5284°E

Yunlin County Council 雲林縣議會

Type
- Type: county council

Leadership
- Speaker: Huang Kai since 2023
- Deputy Speaker: Tsai Yung-te since 2022

Structure
- Seats: 43
- Political groups: Independent (21); DPP (11); KMT (9); TSU (1); Taiwan People's (1)

Elections
- Voting system: Single non-transferable vote
- Last election: 2022

Meeting place
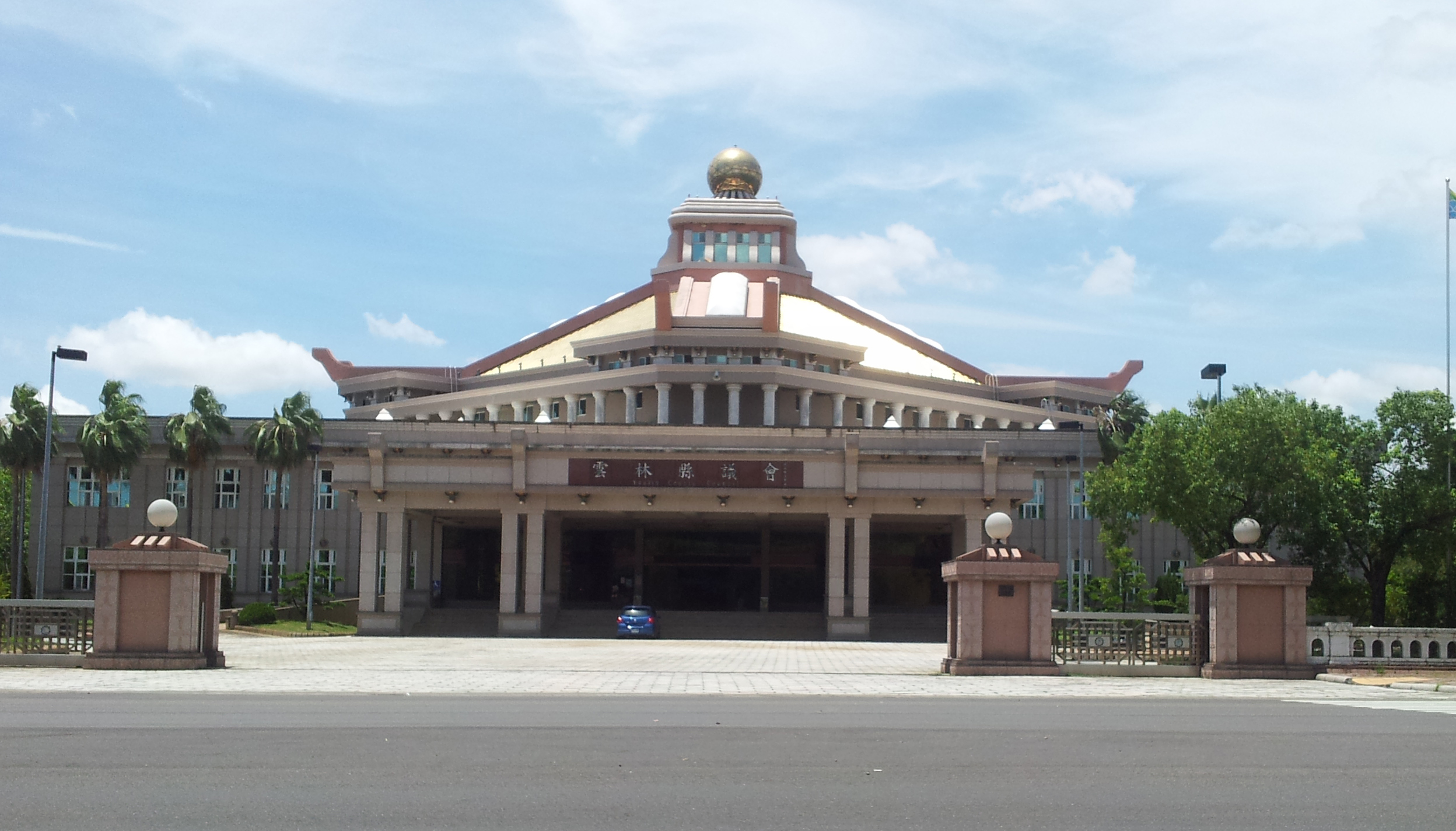
- Douliu City, Yunlin County, Taiwan

Website
- Official website (in Chinese)

The Yunlin County Council (YLCC; traditional Chinese: 雲林縣議會; simplified Chinese: 云林县议会; pinyin: Yúnlín Xiàn Yìhuì) is the elected county council of Yunlin County, Republic of China. The council is composed of 43 councilors, last elected at the 2022 Republic of China local election on 26 November 2022.

== History ==
The current county council building was completed and started its operation on 27 September 2001.

== Architecture ==
The county council building has a 1,090 m^{2} area of session room. There is also a 4,000 m^{2} Democracy Square in front of the building.

== Transportation ==
The council is accessible from the south-west of Douliu Station of Taiwan Railway.

== See also ==
- Yunlin County Government
