= House of Citizen-Memorial Hall of Attendance =

Hall in Douliu, Yunlin, Taiwan

- 行啟紀念公民會館
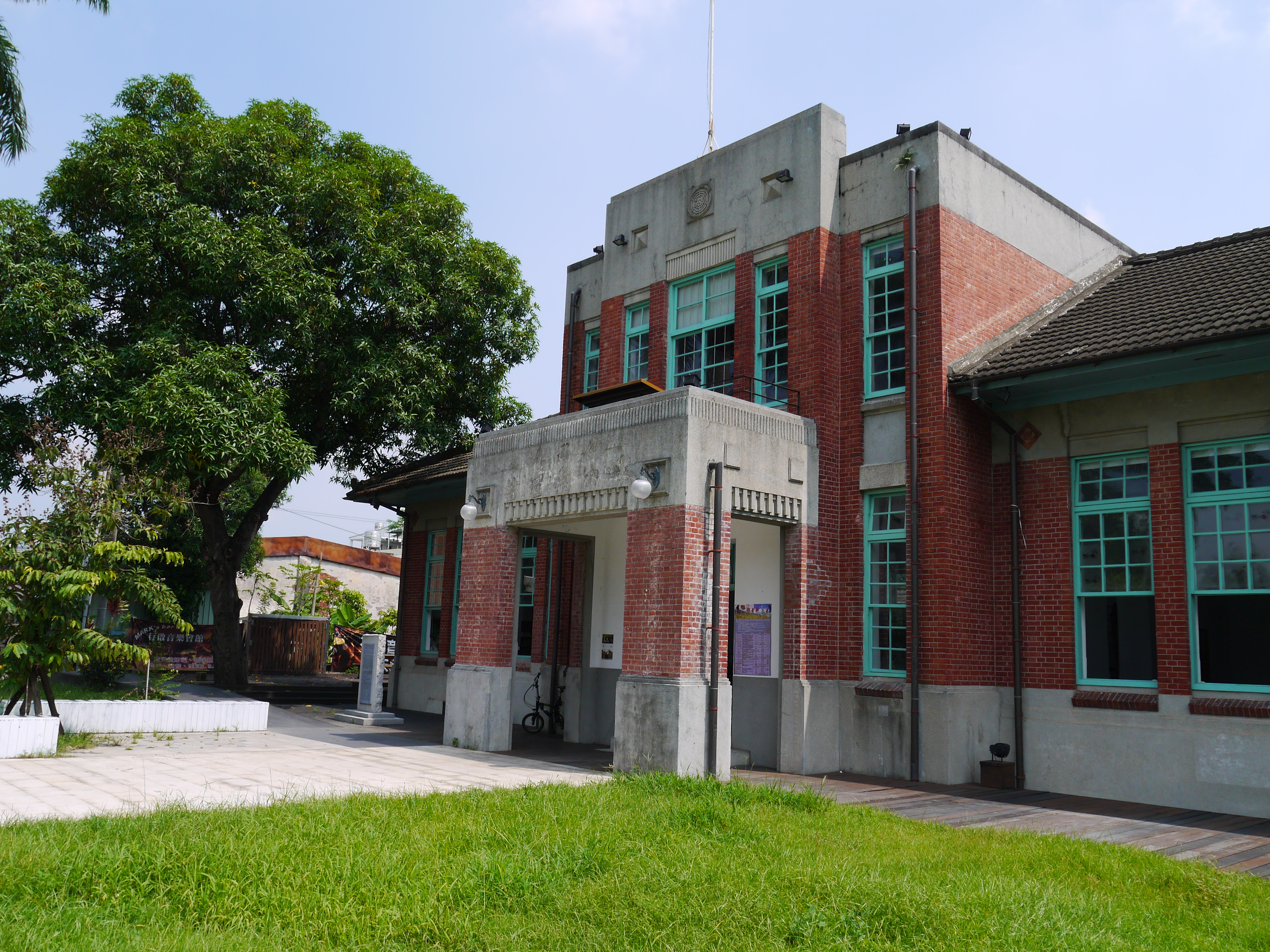
- Interactive map of the House of Citizen-Memorial Hall of Attendance area

General information
- Type: hall
- Location: Douliu, Yunlin, Taiwan
- Coordinates: 23°42′20.6″N 120°32′30.0″E
- Completed: circa 1927
- Opened: October 2011

The House of Citizen-Memorial Hall of Attendance (traditional Chinese: 行啟紀念公民會館; simplified Chinese: 行启纪念公民会馆; pinyin: Xíngqǐ Jìniàn Gōngmín Huìguǎn) is a hall in Douliu City, Yunlin County, Taiwan.

== History ==
=== Empire of Japan ===
The establishment of the hall originated from the Crown Prince Hirohito's visit to Taiwan in 1923. The construction of the hall was initiated by Wu Keming, with funds he raised from community donations and government funds. Construction was completed in 1926. The hall then served as a commemoration for the Crown Prince's visit. It also became a public gathering venue for residents for meetings, seminars, banquets, and performances.

=== Republic of China ===
After the handover of Taiwan from Japan to the Republic of China in 1945, the building was leased to several companies such as Groundwater Company, Chiayi Motor Vehicle Office Douliu Subdivision, and Public Employees Mart. The building was badly damaged during the 1999 Jiji earthquake. In 2001, the building was declared a historical monument and renovation works were carried out to repair all of the damages caused by the earthquake. The works were completed in 2006. In October 2011, the Yunlin County Government officially commenced the operation of the building and renamed it the House of Citizen-Memorial Hall of Attendance. In March 2016, the management of the building was given back to Douliu City Office.

== Events ==
The hall regularly held music performances and movie screenings.

== Transportation ==
The hall is accessible within walking distance south of Douliu Station of Taiwan Railway.

== See also ==
- List of tourist attractions in Taiwan
