= Asia Winter Baseball League =

Professional baseball league

- Current season, competition or edition: 2026 Asia Winter Baseball League
- Sport: Baseball
- Founded: 2012
- No. of teams: 4~6
- Country: Dominican Republic; Japan; South Korea; Taiwan; European Union; United States
- Continent: Asia
- Most recent champion: Japan (Japanese Amateur Baseball Association in 2025)
- Most titles: Japan (7 titles)
- Tournament format: Short-League
- Website: https://awb.cpbl.com.tw/en

The Asia Winter Baseball League is a professional baseball league hosted in Taiwan with 2012 as its inaugural season. Making use of the warm and dry winter climate in West Taiwan, the short term league aims to offer young baseball players additional training experience and continued exposure in off-season games. It is the de facto successor to the now defunct Asia Series.

== Seasons ==
=== 2012 ===
Season 2012 was played between Japan, Taiwan Red, Taiwan White, and the Dominican Republic, with Japan winning the championship.

=== 2013 ===
Season 2013 was played between the teams of Nippon Professional Baseball League, Korea Baseball Organization, Chinese Professional Baseball League of Taiwan, and the Dominican Republic. Japan won the league phase but lost the playoff final to South Korea.

=== 2015 ===
Season 2015 was played between the teams of Nippon Professional Baseball League, Korea Baseball Organization, Chinese Professional Baseball League of Taiwan, the Chinese Taipei National Training Team, and the Team Europe. This was the first time since the Asia Winter Baseball League was founded that Team Europe was invited. Team Europe consisted of total 30 players from different countries (12 Italians, 8 Dutch, 3 German, 2 French, 1 Czech, 1 Belgian, 1 Croat, 1 Hispanic and 1 Romanian). The Chinese Taipei National Training Team won the championship with team Japan as runner-up.

=== 2016 ===
Season 2016 was played between the 2 teams of Nippon Professional Baseball League (East Japan/West Japan), Korea Baseball Organization Team, Chinese Professional Baseball League Team of Taiwan, Chinese Taipei National Training Team, and the Team Europe. The final was played between the 2 Japanese teams. The West Japan team consisting of players from Nippon Professional Baseball League teams from West Japan won the championship.

=== 2017 ===
Season 2017 was played between the 2 teams of Nippon Professional Baseball League (East Japan/West Japan), Korea Baseball Organization Team, Chinese Professional Baseball League Team of Taiwan, the Japan Amateur Baseball Association All Star Team, and the WBSC All Star team managed by WBSC consisting of Team Europe players augmented with additional U.S. players. Experiencing player shortages due to injuries and early departures of team members, WBSC team took on amateur baseball players from Japan and Taiwan as replacements. The East Japan team consisting of players from Nippon Professional Baseball League teams from East Japan won the championship.

=== 2018 ===
Season 2018 was played by 5 teams, 2 teams of Nippon Professional Baseball League (East Japan/West Japan), one Korea Baseball Organization Team, one Chinese Professional Baseball League of Taiwan team, the Japan Amateur Baseball Association All Star Team. 40 regular season games were played November 24 - December 13, 2018. Each team was playing 16 games, top four teams played three more games in playoffs December 14–16, 2018. All games were played at either Taichung Intercontinental Baseball Stadium or Douliu Baseball Stadium

NPB West missed the Playoffs. KBO finished in fourth place, JABA team in third place, CPBL in second place, NPB East winners.

=== 2019 ===
The CPBL Expansion team Wei Chuan Dragons have expressed their willingness to send a team. source: CPBL Stats

=== 2026 ===
The Chinese Taipei University Sports Federation (CTUSF) baseball team made its debut in the tournament.

== Previous Results ==
Edition	Year	Host City	Champions	Score	Runners-up	Third place	Fourth place	No. of Teams
1	2012	(Taiwan); Taichung	(Japan); NPB	5-2	(Taiwan); CPBL White	(Taiwan); CPBL Red	Dominican Republic NT	4
2	2013	(Taiwan); Taichung	(South Korea); KBO	6-2	(Japan); NPB	(Taiwan); CPBL	Dominican Republic NT	4
3	2015	(Taiwan); Taichung	(Taiwan); Chinese Taipei NT	4-2	(Japan); NPB	(South Korea); KBO	(Taiwan); CPBL	5
4	2016	(Taiwan); Taichung	(Japan); NPB West	6-1	(Japan); NPB East	(Taiwan); Chinese Taipei NT	(South Korea); KBO	6
5	2017	(Taiwan); Taichung	(Japan); NPB East	4-1	(South Korea); KBO	(Japan); Japanese Amateur Baseball Association	(Taiwan); CPBL	6
6	2018	(Taiwan); Douliu	(Japan); NPB East	1-0	(Taiwan); CPBL	(Japan); Japanese Amateur Baseball Association	(South Korea); KBO	5
7	2019	(Taiwan); Taichung	(Japan); Japanese Amateur Baseball Association	4-2	(Japan); NPB Red	(Taiwan); Wei Chuan Dragons	(Taiwan); CPBL	6
8	2023	(Taiwan); Douliu	(Taiwan); TSG Hawks	7-1	(Japan); NPB Red	(Taiwan); CPBL	(Japan); Japanese Amateur Baseball Association	6
9	2024	(Taiwan); Douliu	(Japan); NPB White	3-1	(Japan); Japanese Amateur Baseball Association	Taiwan Mountains	Taiwan Seas	5
10	2025	(Taiwan); Chiayi	(Japan); Japanese Amateur Baseball Association	5-4	(Japan); NPB	Taiwan Mountains	Taiwan Seas	5
11	2026	(Taiwan)						6

== All-time Table (Excluding playoffs) ==
Pos.	Team	P	W	L	T	F	A	Diff	Win%	NPB%	Best finish
1	Japan	233	133	79	21	1286	912	+374	.571	.627	
	(Japan) NPB	57	43	11	3	378	189	+189	.754	.796	Champions (2012)
	(Japan) NPB Red	15	9	3	3	91	60	+31	.600	.750	Runners up (2019)
	Japan Amateur Baseball Association	48	27	14	7	266	158	+108	.562	.659	Champions (2019)
	(Japan) NPB East	49	27	19	3	227	197	+30	.551	.587	Champions (2017, 2018)
	(Japan) NPB West	49	22	23	4	246	227	+19	.449	.489	Champions (2016)
	(Japan) NPB White	15	5	9	1	78	81	-3	.333	.357	Fifth place (2019)
2	South Korea	100	45	42	13	488	532	-44	.450	.517	
	(South Korea) KBO	100	45	42	13	488	532	-44	.450	.517	Champions (2013)
3	Taiwan	186	83	89	14	952	944	+8	.446	.483	
	(Taiwan) CPBL Red	21	12	9	0	100	93	+7	.571	.571	Third place (2012)
	(Taiwan) Wei Chuan Dragons	15	7	6	2	77	76	+1	.467	.538	Third place (2019)
	(Taiwan) Chinese Taipei NT	31	14	12	5	169	160	+9	.452	.538	Champions (2015)
	(Taiwan) CPBL White	19	8	11	0	87	84	+3	.421	.421	Runners Up (2012)
	(Taiwan) CPBL	199	42	51	7	519	531	-12	.420	.452	Runners Up (2018)
4	Rest of World	48	9	33	6	214	404	-190	.188	.214	
	(Europe) (Japan) (Taiwan) (United States) WBSC All Stars	17	4	11	2	62	127	-65	.235	.267	Sixth place (2017)
	Team Europe	31	5	22	4	152	277	-125	.161	.185	Fifth place (2015)
5	Dominican Republic	41	7	34	0	138	286	-148	.171	.171	
	Dominican Republic NT	41	7	34	0	138	286	-148	.171	.171	Fourth place (2012, 2013)

== See also ==
- Asia Series
- Chinese Professional Baseball League (Taiwan)
- Taiwan baseball team
- Professional baseball in Taiwan
- Chinese Professional Baseball League (CPBL) awards
