= Beigang Cultural Center =

Cultural center in Beigang, Yunlin, Taiwan

- 北港文化中心
- Interactive map of the Beigang Cultural Center area

General information
- Type: cultural center
- Location: Beigang, Yunlin, Taiwan
- Coordinates: 23°34′42.0″N 120°18′5.5″E
- Construction started: February 2014
- Completed: February 2015
- Owner: Yunlin County Government

Technical details
- Floor area: 2,918 m^{2}
- Grounds: 7,652 m^{2}

Design and construction
- Architects: Malone Chang, Chen Yu-lin
- Architecture firm: MAYU architects+
- Structural engineer: Li-Yen Wang Structural Engineers Associates

The Beigang Cultural Center (Chinese: 北港文化中心; pinyin: Běigǎng Wénhuà Zhōngxīn) is a cultural center in Beigang Township, Yunlin County, Taiwan.

== History ==
The tender to construct the center was held in May 2012. Construction of the building started in February 2014 and completed a year later in February 2015.

== Architecture ==
The center was designed by MAYU architects+. It was constructed on a 7,652 m^{2} of land with building area of 2,053 m^{2} and a total floor area of 2,918 m^{2}.

== See also ==
- List of tourist attractions in Taiwan
