= Soy Sauce Brewing Museum =

Museum in Douliu, Yunlin, Taiwan

- 黑金釀造館
- Location: Douliu, Yunlin, Taiwan
- Coordinates: 23°43′11.5″N 120°35′55.8″E
- Type: food museum
- Management: Tatung Company
- Website: www.tatungcan.com.tw

The Soy Sauce Brewing Museum (traditional Chinese: 黑金釀造館; simplified Chinese: 黑金酿造馆; pinyin: Hēijīn Niàngzào Guǎn) is a museum in Douliu City, Yunlin County, Taiwan.

== Transportation ==
The museum is accessible south east from Shiliu Station of Taiwan Railway.

== See also ==
- List of museums in Taiwan
