= Shiliu railway station =

Railway station in Yunlin, Taiwan

Shiliu 石榴
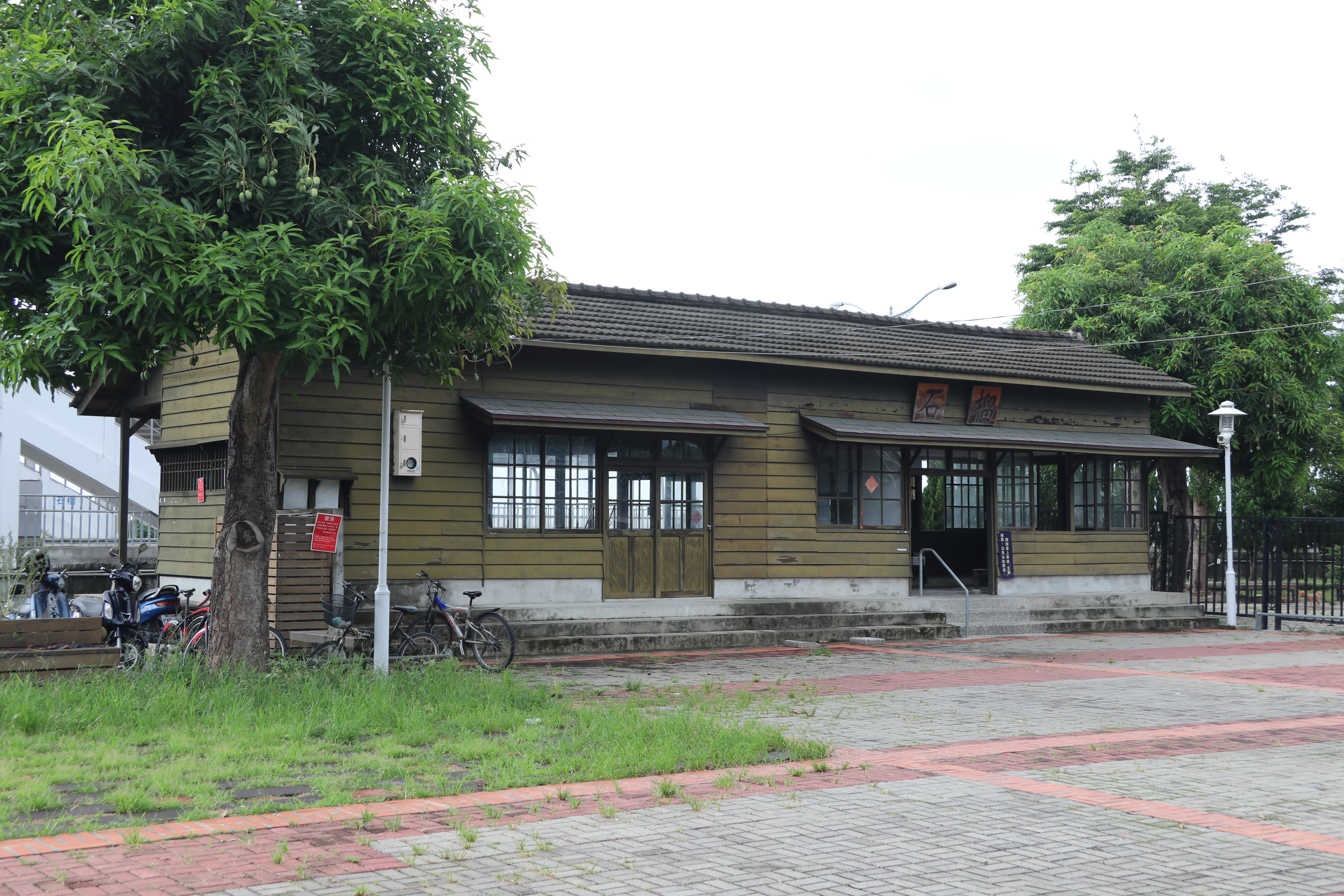

General information
- Location: Douliu, Yunlin, Taiwan
- Coordinates: 23°43′54.3″N 120°34′48″E
- Operated by: Taiwan Railway Corporation
- Line: Western Trunk line (157)
- Distance: 255.8 km from Keelung

Other information
- Classification: 招呼站 (Taiwan Railways Administration level)

History
- Opened: 15 October 1905
- Previous names: 石榴班驛 (Japanese)
Location

Shiliu (Chinese: 石榴車站; pinyin: Shíliú Chēzhàn) is a railway station on the Taiwan Railway West Coast line located in Douliu City, Yunlin County, Taiwan. It does not contain many passenger amenities.

== Overview ==
This wooden station has two side platforms. It originally had an island platform, but it was demolished after the station was converted to a depot. Shiliu station currently only serves local services and is considered a hikyō station.

=== History ===
- 15 October 1905: Opened as Shiliuban-eki (石榴班驛).
- 19 September 1908: Due to lack of business, service ceased.
- 1941: Re-opened as Shiliuban Signal Field (石榴班信號場).
- 1945: Name changed to Shiliuban Switching Station (石榴班號誌站).
- 6 June 1950: Name changed to Shiliuban Station (石榴班車站). Upgraded to Class 3 station.
- 1 March 1955: Name changed to Shiliu Station (石榴站).
- 15 August 1990: Station downgraded to a hikyō station. Management now under Douliu Station.

== Around the station ==
- National Freeway 3
- Shiliuban River
- Soy Sauce Brewing Museum

== See also ==
- List of railway stations in Taiwan

Preceding station	Taiwan Railway	Following station
Linnei towards Keelung	Western Trunk line	Douliu towards Pingtung
