= Yunlin County Stadium =

Stadium in Douliu, Yunlin, Taiwan

- 雲林縣政府體育場
- Interactive map of Yunlin County Stadium
- Location: Douliu, Yunlin, Taiwan
- Coordinates: 23°41′45.4″N 120°31′37.4″E
- Capacity: 10,000 audience
- Type: Stadium

Website
- www4.yunlin.gov.tw/stadium (in Chinese)

The Yunlin County Stadium (Chinese: 雲林縣政府體育場; pinyin: Yúnlín Xiàn Zhèngfǔ Tǐyùchǎng) is a multi-use stadium in Douliu City, Yunlin County, Taiwan. The stadium is able to hold 10,000 people.

== Transportation ==
The stadium is accessible within walking distance South West from Douliu Station of Taiwan Railway.

== See also ==
- List of stadiums in Taiwan

| Preceded by Unknown (Philippines) Bacolod | AFC Women's Championship; Final Venue; 2001 | Succeeded by Rajamangala Stadium (Thailand) Bangkok |
