= Douliu Baseball Stadium =

Baseball venue in Douliu, Yunlin, Taiwan

Coordinates: 23.7177825°N 120.536027°E

Douliou Baseball Stadium 斗六棒球場
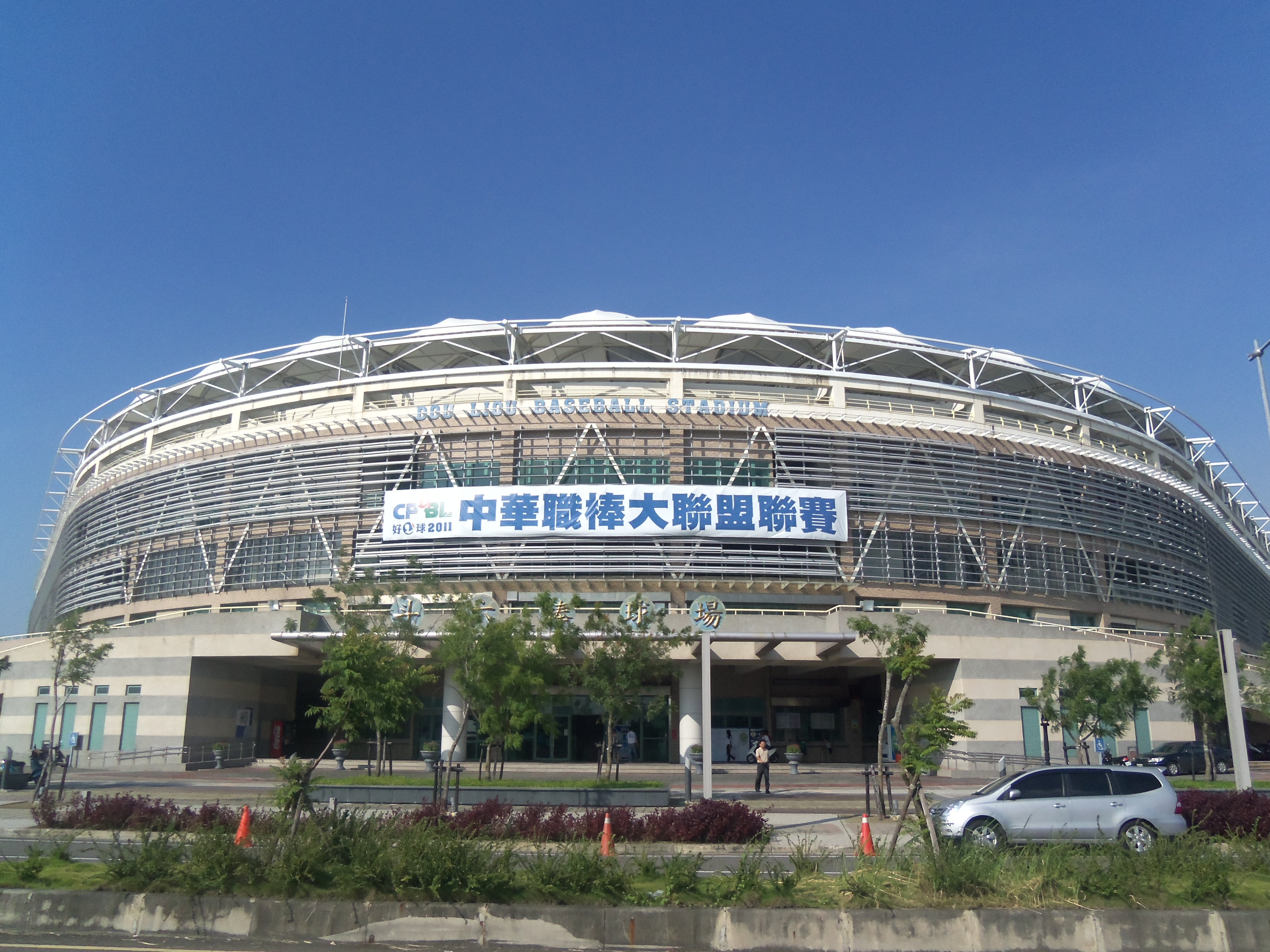
- Interactive map of Douliou Baseball Stadium 斗六棒球場
- Location: Douliu, Yunlin, Taiwan
- Owner: Douliu City Government
- Capacity: 15,000 (2005)
- Surface: grass
- Field size: Left Field Line - 330 ft Center Field - 400 ft Right Field Line - 330 ft

Construction
- Groundbreaking: May 2004
- Opened: September 2005

Tenant
- Wei Chuan Dragons (minors) (2020-Present)

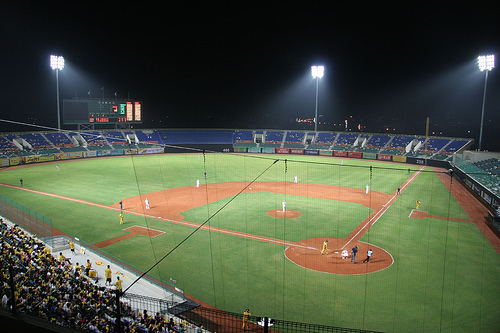
Douliu Baseball Stadium field

The Douliou Baseball Stadium (Chinese: 斗六棒球場; pinyin: Dòuliù Bàngqiú Chǎng) is a baseball stadium in Douliu City, Yunlin County, Taiwan. It was opened in 2005 and has a capacity of 15,000 people.

The ballpark has hosted a number of games of the CPBL as well as of the Asia Winter Baseball League, most recently in November/December 2023.

== See also ==
- Chinese Professional Baseball League
- List of stadiums in Taiwan
- Sport in Taiwan
