= Douliu railway station =

Railway station in Yunlin, Taiwan

Douliu 斗六
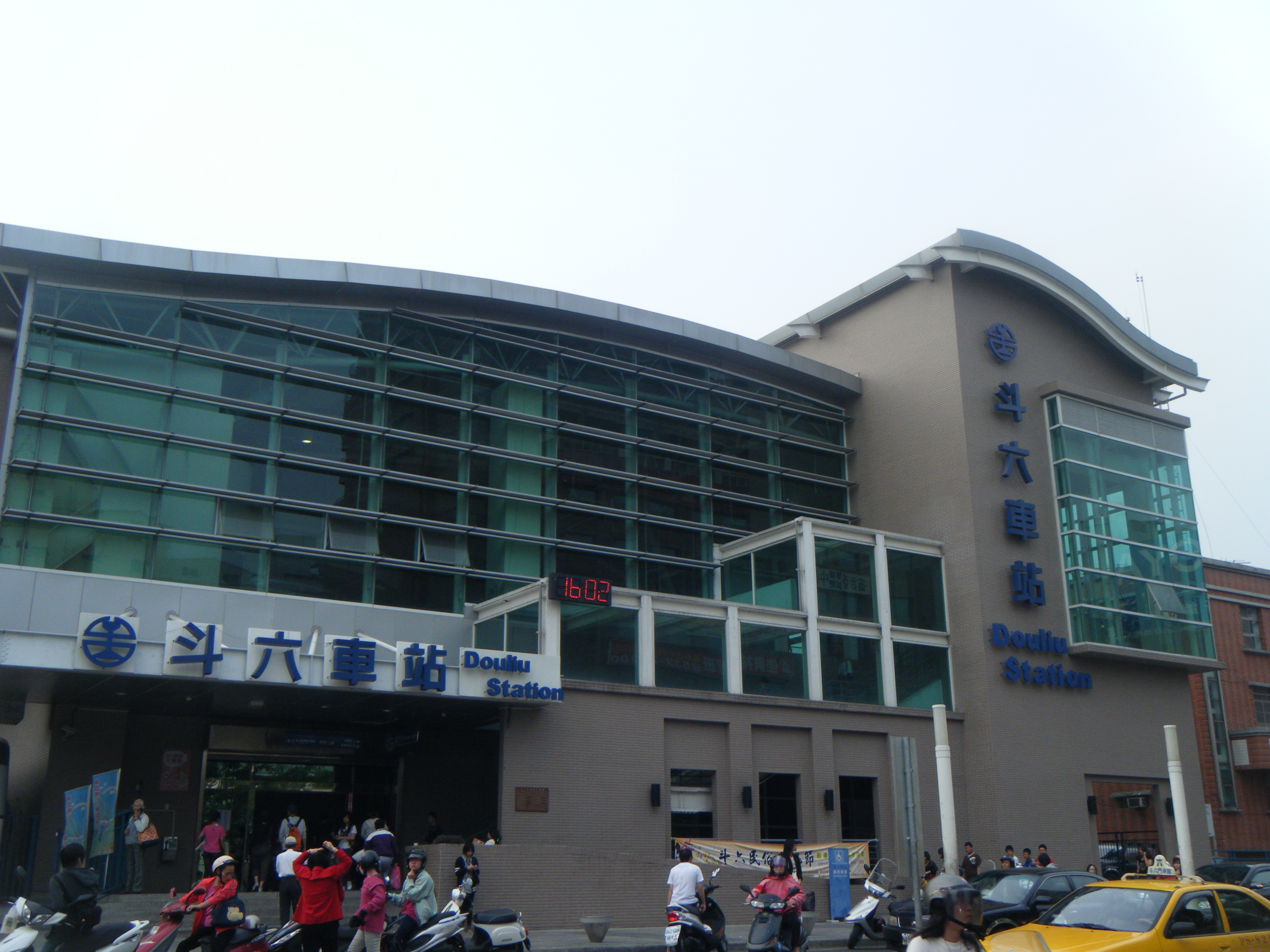

Chinese name
- Traditional Chinese: 斗六
Transcriptions
Standard Mandarin
- Hanyu Pinyin: Dòuliù
- Bopomofo: ㄉㄡˇ ㄌㄧㄡˋ

General information
- Location: 187 Minsheng Rd; Douliu, Yunlin County, Taiwan
- Coordinates: 23.7118°N 120.5411°E
- System: Taiwan Railway railway station
- Line: Western Trunk line
- Distance: 260.6 km to Keelung
- Connections: Local bus; Coach

Construction
- Structure type: Ground level

Other information
- Station code: A58 (statistical)
- Classification: First class (Chinese: 一等)
- Website: www.railway.gov.tw/douliou/ (in Chinese)

History
- Opened: 1904-02-01
- Rebuilt: 2008-12-19
- Electrified: 1978-12-19

Key dates
- 1941-03: Rebuilt
- 1958-12: Rebuilt

Passengers
- 2017: 4.885 million per year ▲1.51%
- Rank: 25 out of 228

Services
| Preceding station | Taiwan Railway | Following station |
|---|---|---|
| Shiliu towards Keelung | Western Trunk line | Dounan towards Pingtung |
Location
- Location within Taiwan

Douliu (Chinese: 斗六; pinyin: Dòuliù) is a railway station in Yunlin County, Taiwan served by Taiwan Railway. Yunlin HSR station can be accessed here by bus.

== Overview ==
The station has two island platforms. Ticketing and customer service are located in the main concourse on the second floor, while the tracks are located in front of and behind the station. The station has an accessibility elevator.

=== History ===
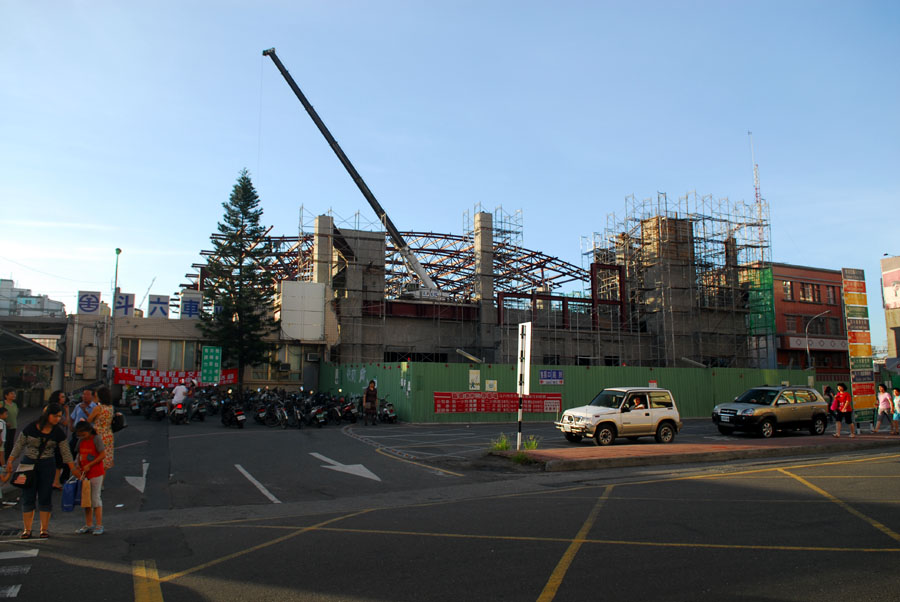
The current Douliu Station, under construction in 2007

- 1904-02-01: The station opened as Toroku-eki (斗六驛).
- 1940: After an earthquake, the station was closed for three months for reconstruction.
- November 1958: The second-generation station (with reinforced concrete) was completed.
- 2006-11-03: The second-generation station was demolished.
- 2008-12-19: The current cross-platform station opened for service.

== Platform layout ==
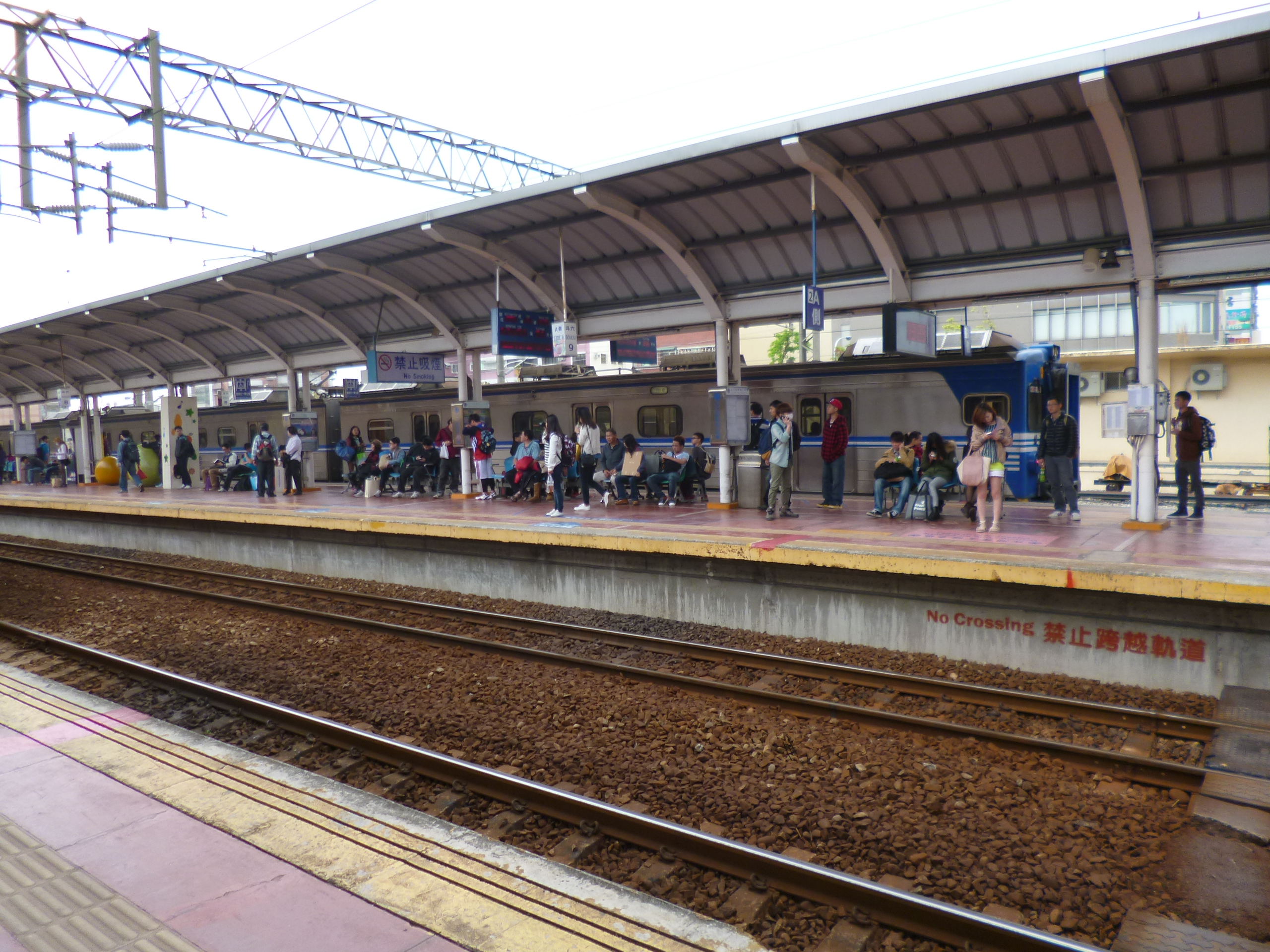
Platform

| 1 | 1A | ■ West Coast line (southbound departure) | Toward Chiayi, Tainan, Kaohsiung |
| 1 | 1A | ■ West Coast line (southbound through service) | Toward Chiayi, Tainan, Kaohsiung |
| 2 | 1B | ■ West Coast line (southbound) | Toward Tainan, Kaohsiung, Pingtung |
| 2 | 1B | ■ South-link line (southbound) | Toward Fangliao, Taitung |
| 3 | 2A | ■ West Coast line (northbound) | Toward Changhua, Taichung, Taipei |
| 3 | 2A | ■ Eastern line (southbound, cross-line) | Toward Yilan, Suao, Hualien |
| 4 | 2B | ■ West Coast line (northbound departure) | Toward Changhua, Taichung, Taipei |
| 4 | 2B | ■ West Coast line (northbound through service) | Toward Changhua, Taichung, Taipei |

== Around the station ==
- Douliou City area
- Huwei River
- Yunlin River
- Yunlin County Government
- House of Citizen-Memorial Hall of Attendance
- Douliu City Office
- National Yunlin University of Science and Technology
- TransWorld University
- Douliu High School
- Yunlin County Stadium

== See also ==
- List of railway stations in Taiwan
