= Hushan Dam =

Dam in Douliu, Yunlin, Taiwan

Hushan Dam 湖山水庫
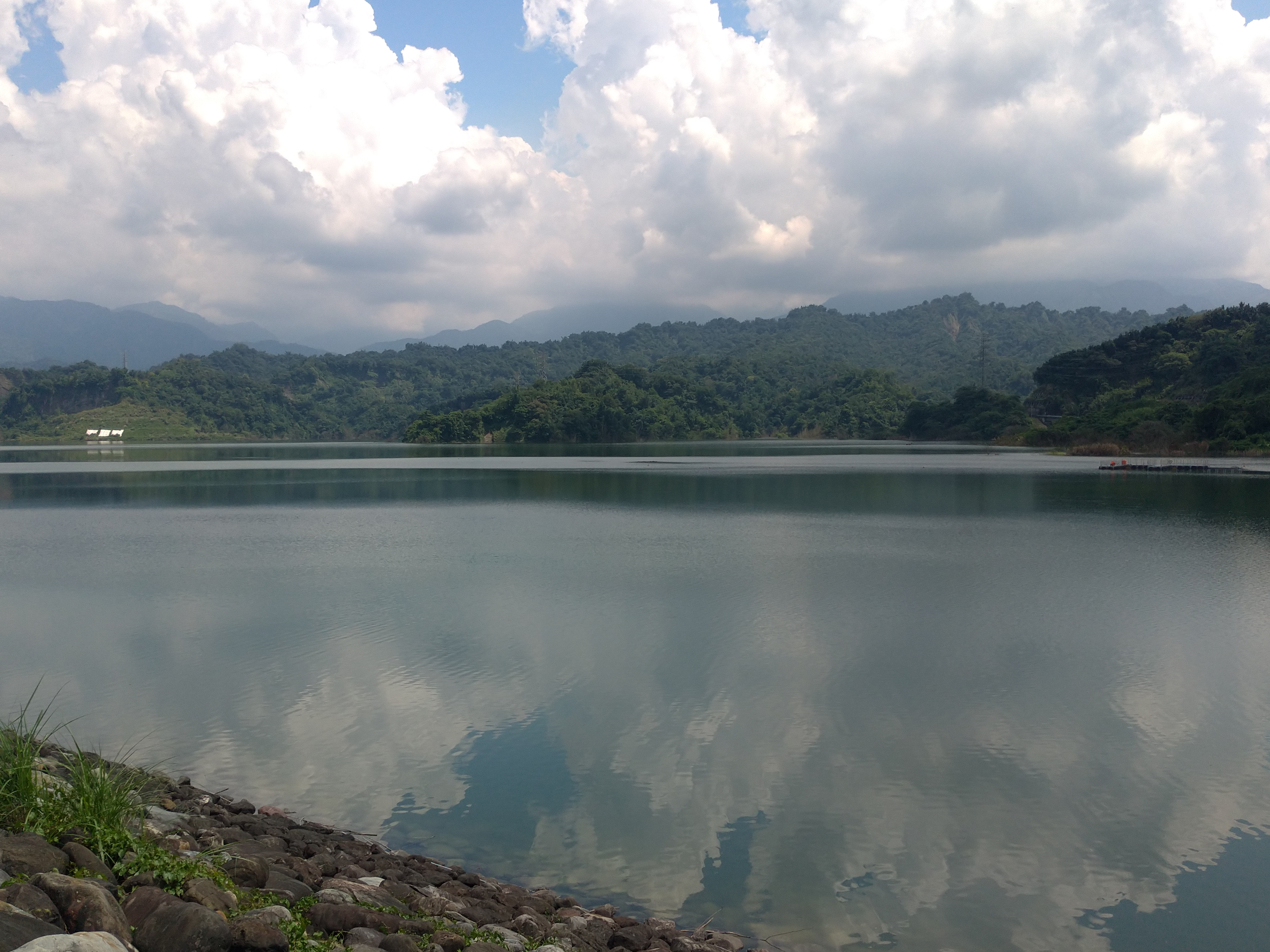

- Location within Yunlin County
- Location: Douliu, Yunlin, Taiwan
- Coordinates: 23°41′46″N 120°37′41″E
- Status: Operational
- Construction began: 2002; 24 years ago
- Opening date: 2016; 10 years ago
- Construction cost: NT$20.47 billion

Dam and spillways
- Height: 75 m (246 ft)
- Length: 1,657 m (5,436 ft)

Reservoir
- Total capacity: 52,180,000 m^{3} (42,300 acre⋅ft)
- Catchment area: 6.58 km^{2} (2.54 mi^{2})

The Hushan Dam (traditional Chinese: 湖山水庫; simplified Chinese: 湖山水库; pinyin: Húshān Shuǐkù; Pe̍h-ōe-jī: Ô͘-soaⁿ Chúi-khò͘) is a dam in Douliu City, Yunlin County, Taiwan. It is the newest dam in Taiwan.

== History and objectives ==
The planning of the dam started already in 1979 and but was approved by Executive Yuan only in 2001. The stated goals of the dam are to "improve both quantity and quality for the domestic water supply in Yunlin County, reduce abstraction of ground water, slow down subsidence and improve environmental quality". Land subsidence, associated with groundwater extraction, has been a problem particularly in Yunlin. Critics maintain that industry needs motivated the dam.

The construction of the dam started in 2002 by Continental Engineering Corporation. However, the construction was delayed for three times due to environmental and historical site preservation issues. Construction was completed in December 2015. The dam was officiated on 2 April 2016 by President Ma Ying-jeou when the sluice gate was closed and the dam started to store water.

== Technical details ==
Water to the dam is diverted from the Qingshui River, a tributary of the Zhuoshui River. The dam can store up to 52.18 million m^{3} of water. The supply of water from Hushan Reservoir and the nearby Jiji Weir to Yunlin will eventually reach 432,000 tons per day.

== See also ==
- List of dams and reservoirs in Taiwan
