= Yunlin County =

County in Taiwan

Yunlin County 雲林縣
- County
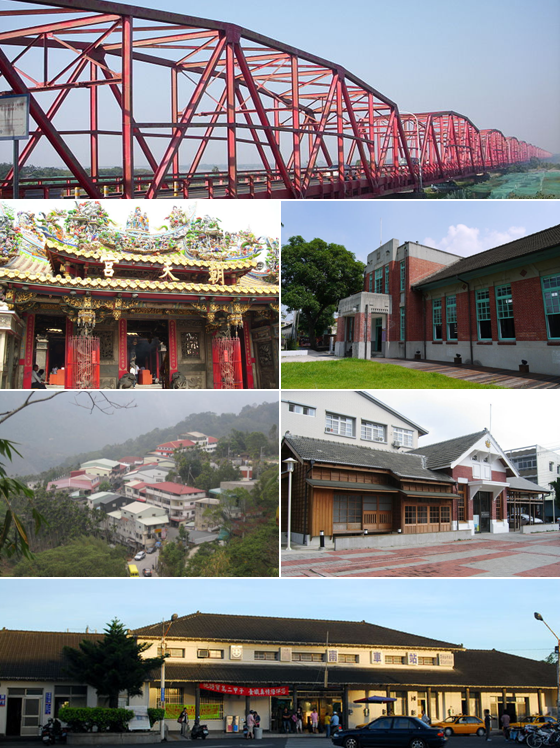
- Top: Xiluo Bridge and Choushui River. Second left: Chaotian Temple in Peigang. Second right: Shinqi Memorial Museum. Third left: Caolin in Tongluo. Third right: Erlun Memorial Museum. Bottom: Dounan Railroad Station.

- Flag Logo

- Coordinates: 23°42′18″N 120°28′34″E
- Country: Taiwan
- Province: Taiwan^{a}
- Region: Western Taiwan
- Seat: Douliu City
- Largest city: Douliu City
- Boroughs: 1 cities, 19 (5 urban, 14 rural) townships

Government
  - County Magistrate: Chang Li-shan (KMT)

Area
  - Total: 1,290.84 km^{2} (498.40 sq mi)
  - Rank: 13 of 22

Population (Sep. 2022)
  - Total: 664,963
  - Rank: 9 of 22
  - Density: 515.140/km^{2} (1,334.21/sq mi)
- Time zone: UTC+8 (National Standard Time)
- ISO 3166 code: TW-YUN
- Website: www.yunlin.gov.tw
- Symbols
- Bird: Formosan blue magpie (Urocissa caerulea)
- Flower: Moth orchid (Phalaenopsis)
- Tree: Camphor tree (Cinnamomum camphora)
- ^{a} In Taiwan, provinces remain a nominal division according to the Taiwanese constitution, but are no longer considered to have any administrative function practically.

Yunlin County
- Traditional Chinese: 雲林縣
Transcriptions
Standard Mandarin
- Hanyu Pinyin: Yúnlín Xiàn
- Bopomofo: ㄩㄣˊ ㄌㄧㄣˊ ㄒㄧㄢˋ
- Gwoyeu Romatzyh: Yunlin Shiann
- Wade–Giles: Yün²-lin² Hsien⁴
- Tongyong Pinyin: Yúnlín Siàn
- MPS2: Yúnlín Shiàn
- IPA: [y̌n.lǐn ɕjɛ̂n]
Hakka
- Pha̍k-fa-sṳ: Yùn-lìm-yen
Southern Min
- Hokkien POJ: Hûn-lîm-koān
- Tâi-lô: Hûn-lîm-kuān

Yunlin (Note: In local languages: Traditional Chinese script: 雲林縣; Mandarin Pinyin: Yúnlín Xiàn; Hokkien: Hûn-lîm-koān; Sixian Hakka: Yùn-lìm-yen) is a county in western Taiwan. Yunlin County borders the Taiwan Strait to the west, Nantou County to the east, Changhua County to the north at the Zhuoshui River, and Chiayi County to the south at the Beigang River. It has a population of 664,963 as of 2022.

Yunlin is part of the Chianan Plain, a flat land known for its agriculture. Agricultural products of Yunlin County include pomelo, tea leaves, suan cai, papaya and melon. Yunlin's rivers give it potential for hydroelectricity. Douliu is the largest and capital city of Yunlin. It is the only county on the main island of Taiwan where no city with the same name exists. Yunlin is one of the least developed counties on the West coast, and suffers from emigration.

== History ==
=== Dutch Formosa ===
During the Dutch Formosa era, Ponkan (modern-day Beigang) was an important coastal castle.

=== Qing Dynasty ===
Yunlin County was established during the Qing Dynasty. Liu Mingchuan was in charge of Taiwan, which had been divided into three counties since 1683, Yunlin being part of Zhuluo County. Mountains made transportation and communication between bordering counties (Changhua and Chiayi) difficult, so Liu suggested a new county, called Yunlin, for easier management. In 1887, Yunlin became one of the four counties of the new Taiwan Prefecture.

=== Empire of Japan ===
During Japanese rule, Yunlin (as Unrin) County was again abolished due to the resistance from the local people and combined with Tainan Prefecture. However, Toroku Town (斗六街; modern-day Douliu) continued to be an important city of central Taiwan.

=== Republic of China ===
The Yunlin area remained under Tainan County after the handover of Taiwan from Japan to the Republic of China on 25 October 1945. On 16 August 1950, Yunlin County was separated from Tainan County, with Douliu Township as the county seat. On 25 December 1981, Douliu Township was upgraded to a county-administered city. Yunlin is the only county on Taiwan island without a city of the same name. Like the rest of Taiwan, Yunlin is nominally a part of Taiwan Province, Republic of China, although the provincial level of government is functionally obsolete.

== Geography ==
Yunlin County is located in the central-south portion of western Taiwan and is at the northern tip of the Chianan Plain. The county is bordered by Nantou County to the east, the Taiwan Strait to the west, Chiayi County to the south separated by the Beigang River, and Changhua County to the north separated by the Zhuoshui River. Its widest distance from east to west is 50 km (31 mi) and from north to south is 38 km (24 mi), with a total area of 1,290.83 km^{2} (498.39 sq mi).

=== Geology ===
Around 80% of Yunlin County are plains and the other 10% are hills. Generally the county is covered with high green space. In 2015, the county experienced 75% of Taiwan's total land subsidence, over an area of 600 km^{2} (230 sq mi) due to its groundwater overuse.

=== Climate ===
The weather in the county is tropical, with an annual average temperature of 22.6 °C and an average annual rainfall of 1,028.9 mm.

== Administration ==
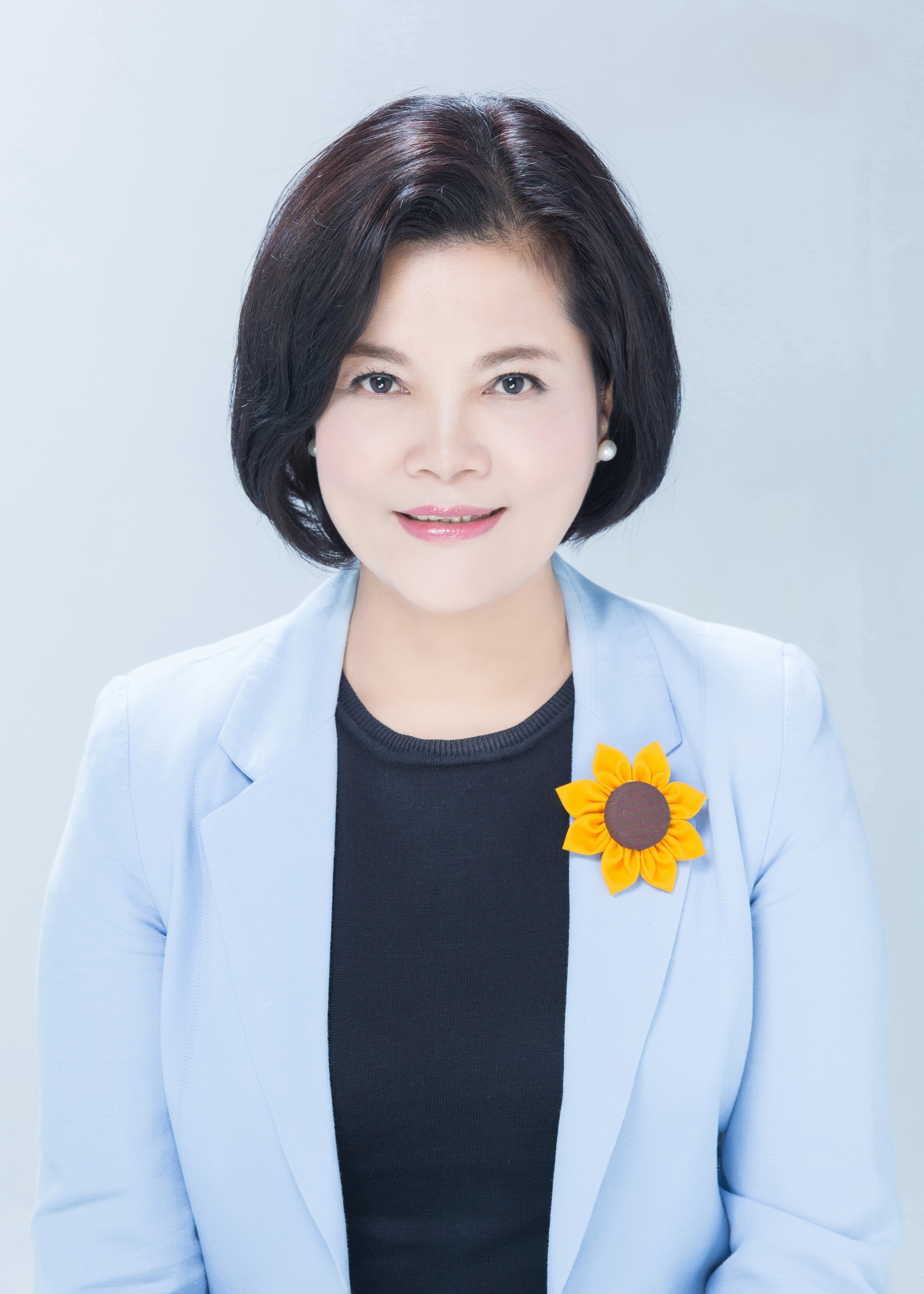
Chang Li-shan, Magistrate of Yunlin County

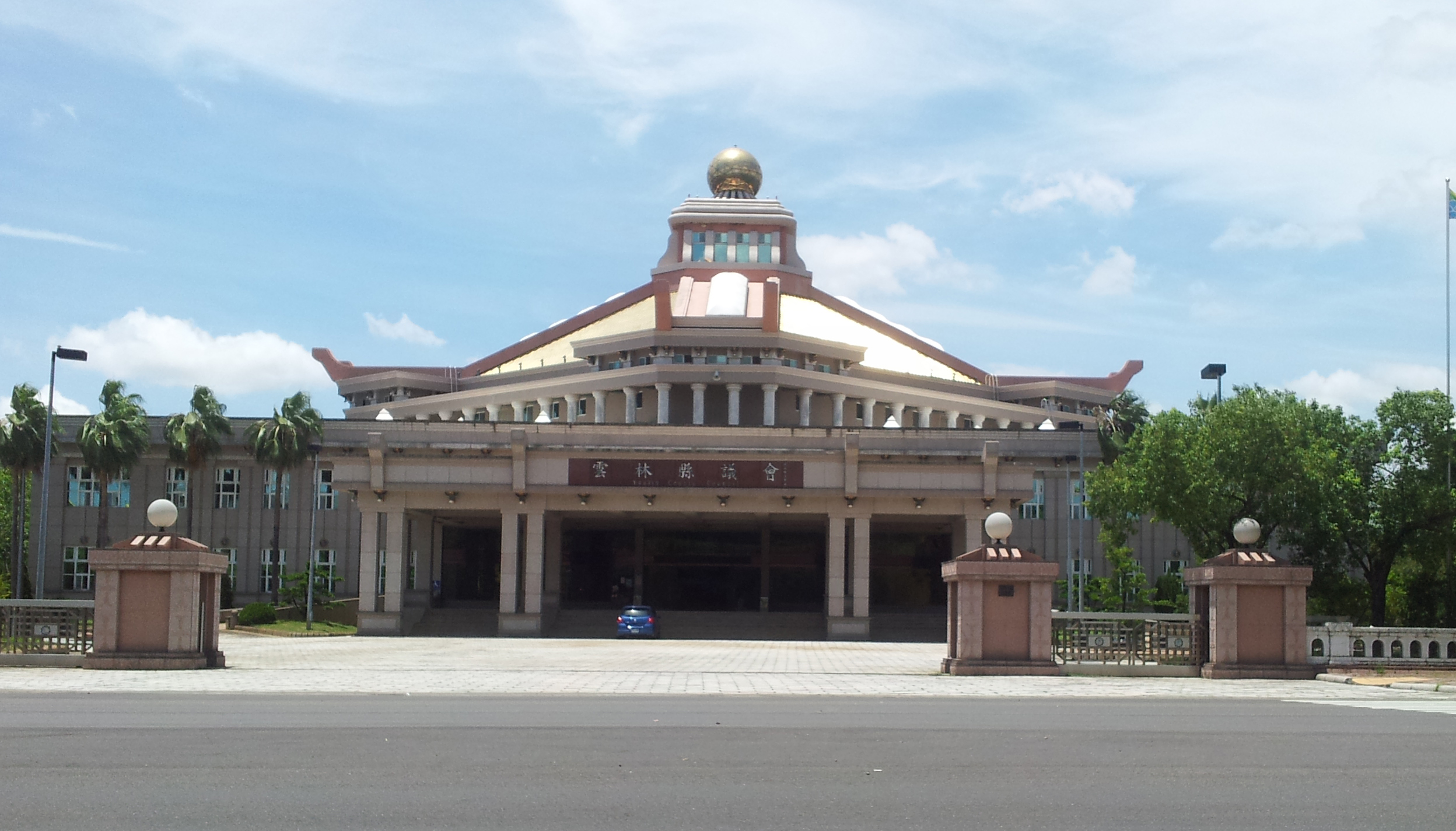
Yunlin County Council

Yunlin County is divided into 1 city, 5 urban townships and 14 rural townships. Douliu City is the county seat and home to the Yunlin County Government and the Yunlin County Council. Chang Li-shan of the Kuomintang is the incumbent Magistrate of Yunlin County.

Type	Name	Chinese	Taiwanese	Hakka
City	Douliu City (Douliou)	斗六市	Táu-la̍k	Téu-liuk
Urban townships	Beigang	北港鎮	Pak-káng	Pet-kóng
Urban townships	Dounan	斗南鎮	Táu-lâm	Téu-nàm
Urban townships	Huwei	虎尾鎮	Hó͘-bóe	Fú-mî
Urban townships	Tuku	土庫鎮	Thô͘-khò͘	Thú-khù
Urban townships	Xiluo (Siluo)	西螺鎮	Sai-lê	Sî-lô
Rural townships	Baozhong (Baojhong)	褒忠鄉	Po-tiong	Pô-chûng
Rural townships	Cihtong (Citong)	莿桐鄉	Chhì-tông	Tshṳ̀-thùng
Rural townships	Dapi	大埤鄉	Tōa-pi	Thai-phî
Rural townships	Dongshi (Dongshih)	東勢鄉	Tang-sì	Tûng-sṳ
Rural townships	Erlun	二崙鄉	Jī-lūn	Ngi-lûn
Rural townships	Gukeng	古坑鄉	Kó͘-kheⁿ	Kú-hâng
Rural townships	Kouhu	口湖鄉	Kháu-ô͘	Khiéu-fù
Rural townships	Linnei	林內鄉	Nâ-lāi	Lìm-nui
Rural townships	Lunbei	崙背鄉	Lūn-pòe	Lûn-poi
Rural townships	Mailiao	麥寮鄉	Be̍h-liâu	Ma̍k-liàu
Rural townships	Shuilin	水林鄉	Chúi-nâ	Súi-lìm
Rural townships	Sihu	四湖鄉	Sì-ô͘	Si-fù
Rural townships	Taixi (Taixi)	臺西鄉	Tâi-se	Thòi-sî
Rural townships	Yuanzhang	元長鄉	Goân-chiáng	Ngièn-tshòng

Color indicates the statutory language status of Hakka in the respective subdivisions.

=== Politics ===
Yunlin County elected two Democratic Progressive Party legislators to the Legislative Yuan during the 2020 legislative election, represented by Liu Chien-kuo and Su Chih-fen. The majority seats of Yunlin County Council is independent but headed by speaker Shen Tsung-lung (Chinese: 沈宗隆; pinyin: Shěn Zōnglóng) of the Kuomintang.

== Demographics and Culture ==
Historical population
Year	Pop.	±%
1946	442,554	—
1950	510,444	+15.3%
1955	593,923	+16.4%
1960	672,557	+13.2%
1965	749,416	+11.4%
1970	800,578	+6.8%
1975	801,422	+0.1%
1980	796,276	−0.6%
1985	791,186	−0.6%
1990	753,639	−4.7%
1995	753,998	+0.0%
2000	743,368	−1.4%
2005	728,490	−2.0%
2010	717,653	−1.5%
2015	699,633	−2.5%
2020	676,873	−3.3%
2025	650,989	−3.8%
Source: 1. Written at 台南縣. 臺南縣35年人口統計報告表(二)現住人口性別 (xlsx) (Report) (in Chinese (Taiwan)). 台南市: 台南市政府民政局. 2024-07-01.; 2. "雲林縣現住人口 (1950)" (pdf). 雲林縣統計要覽 (Report) (in Chinese (Taiwan)). Vol. 中華民國39年(39.12). 雲林縣政府. December 1950. pp. 9–12.; 3. "雲林縣現住戶口數 (1951-1955)" (pdf). 雲林縣統計年報 (Report) (in Chinese (Taiwan)). Vol. 中華民國44年度[45. 8]. 雲林縣政府. August 1956. pp. 30–31.; 4. "雲林縣現住戶口數 (1959-1970)" (pdf). 雲林縣統計要覽 (Report) (in Chinese (Taiwan)). Vol. 中華民國59年度(60. 7). 雲林縣政府. July 1971. p. 15.; 5. "縣市人口按性別及五齡組(63)" (in Chinese (Taiwan)). 內政部戶政司.

Cultural activities in the county is regulated by the Bureau of Cultural Affairs of the Yunlin County Government, which holds exhibitions, speeches, performances and studies to promote the arts and related activities.

View source data.

=== Sports ===
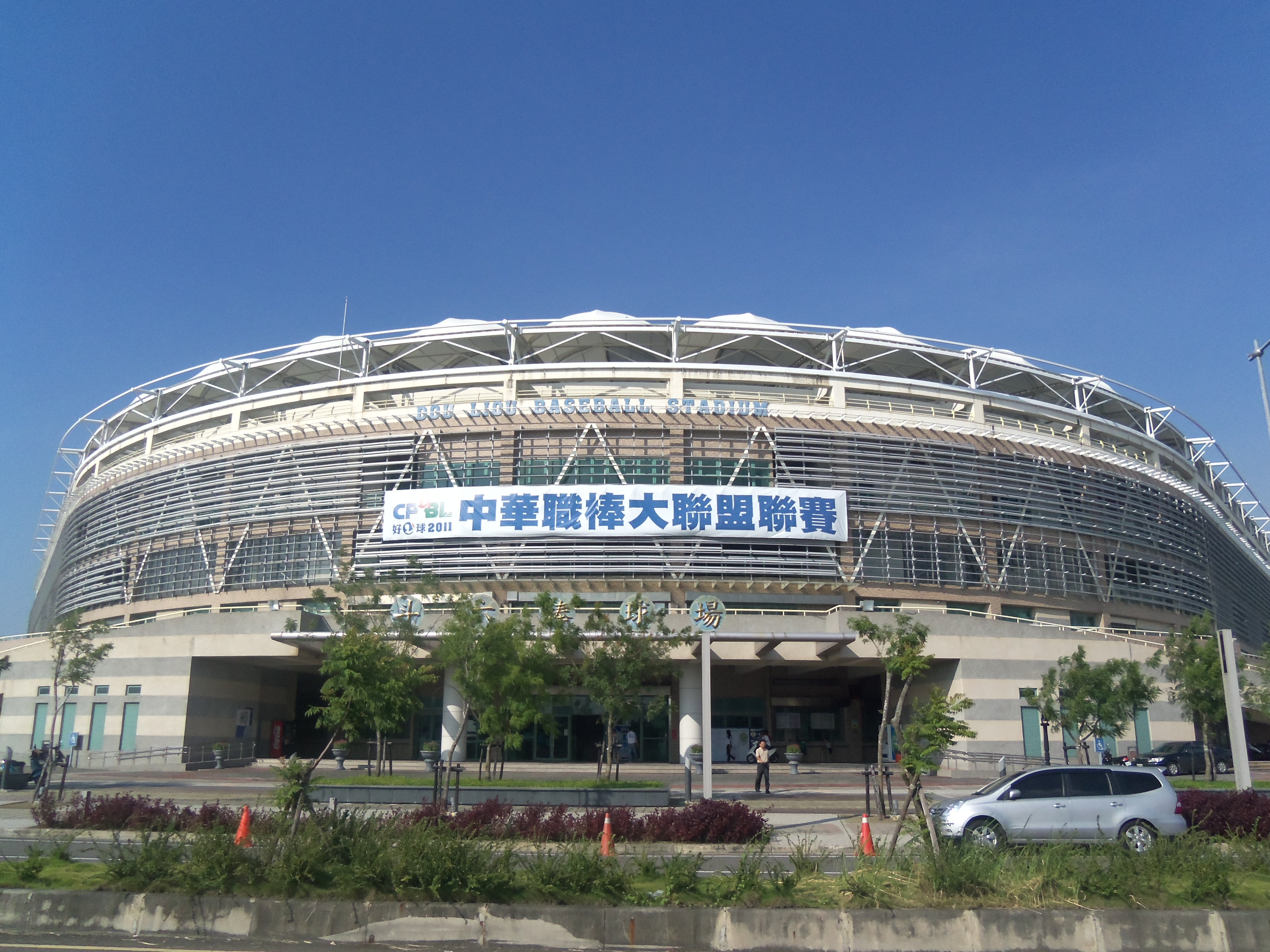
Douliu Baseball Stadium

The county government promotes many sports. The Douliu Baseball Stadium and Yunlin County Stadium are two of the international-level sports facilities in the county.

The first for-all-people games were held in Yunlin County in 2000. The county also hosted the 2005 National Games. In the 2011 National Games at Changhua, Yunlin ranked 11th out of the 22 counties and cities of Taiwan, with 10 gold, 8 silver and 8 bronze medals.

Recent major sporting events held by Yunlin include:

- 2007 Baseball World Cup (co-hosted with Taipei, New Taipei, and Taichung)
- 2010 Intercontinental Cup (co-hosted with Taichung)
- 2013 18U Baseball World Cup (co-hosted with Taichung)
- 2015 WBSC Premier12 (co-hosted with Taipei, Taoyuan, and Taichung)
- 2019 Asian Baseball Championship (co-hosted with Taichung)
- 2022 U-23 Baseball World Cup (co-hosted with Taipei and Taichung)

== Economy ==
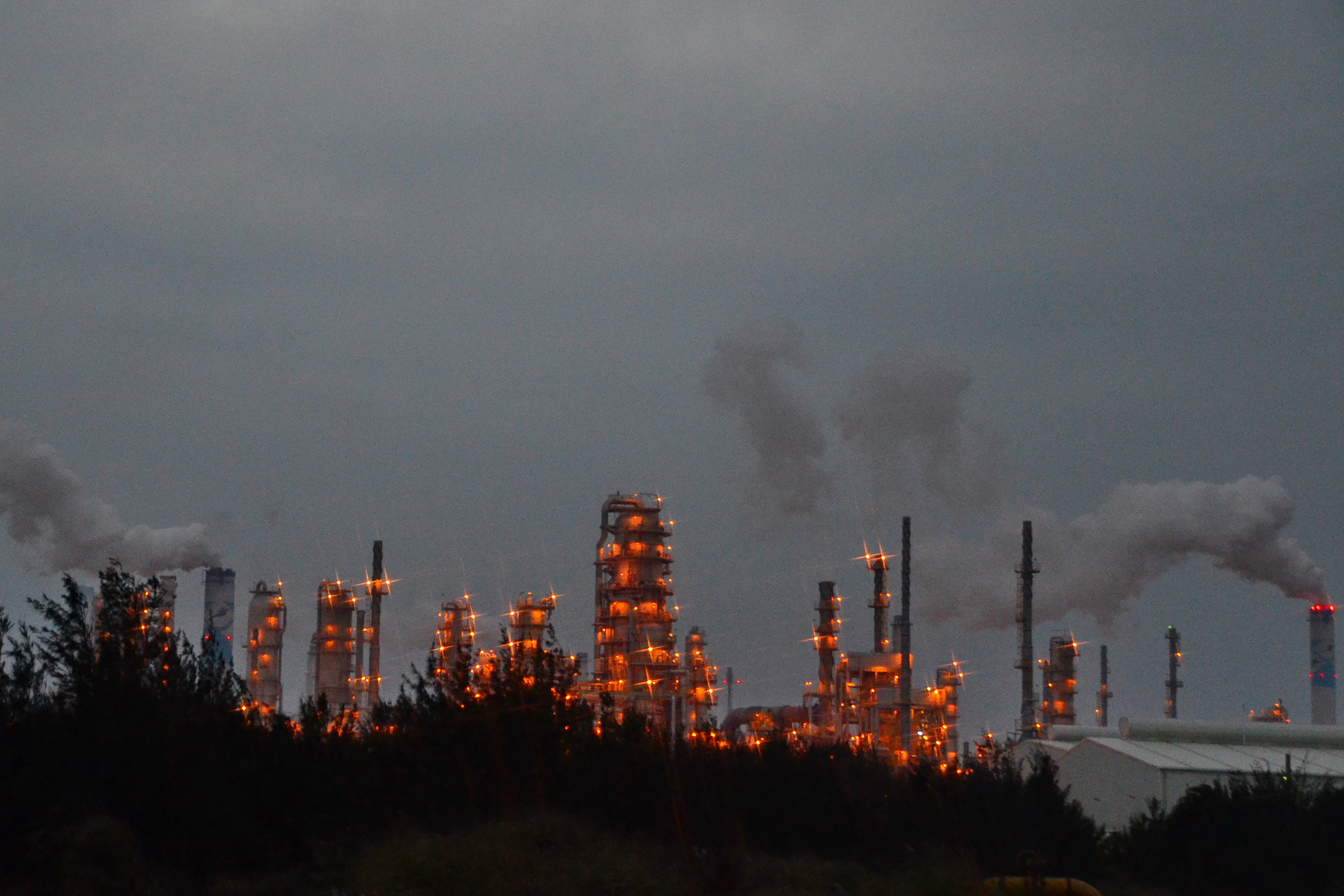
Formosa Plastics Group plant at the Mai-Liao Industrial Complex.

Yunlin County's economy relies mainly on agricultural production, including fresh-water fisheries, although there are also industrial parks. As of 2006, the land use for agriculture, forestry and fishery production accounts about 66.45% of its area. As of July 2015, the county had a total debt of NT$64.8 billion. Monthly, the county government spend NT$600 million for staffs salary and another NT$600 million for retirement funds.

=== Agriculture ===
Farmlands accounts for around 68% of Yunlin County's area. Good weather and fertile lands allows various seasonal crops. Among the agricultural products are coffee, hard clams, horseshoe calms, Taiwan tilapia, shaddock, soy sauce, pickled cabbage, peanuts and sesame oil.

=== Fishery ===
Yunlin County boasts excellent fishing grounds along its coastline. There are several leading fishing ports, at Boziliao, Santiaolun, Taixi, Taizicun, and Jinhu. Several institutions were established in the county to help the development of the county's fishing industries: the Taixi Experimental Fishing Grounds, the Seawater Fish Farming Research Center, the Aquaculture Experimental Station, and the Agriculture Council.

=== Livestock ===
Livestock farming includes pigs, cows, chickens, geese and ducks. The county government has been aggressively helping the dairy farmers to upgrade their feeding techniques, and also set up modern meat-packing facilities.

=== Tourism ===
The county government plans to develop the tourism and recreational industries within the county, such as by establishing a holiday fish market at the Boziliao Fishing Port in the hopes of attracting more visitors.

== Education ==
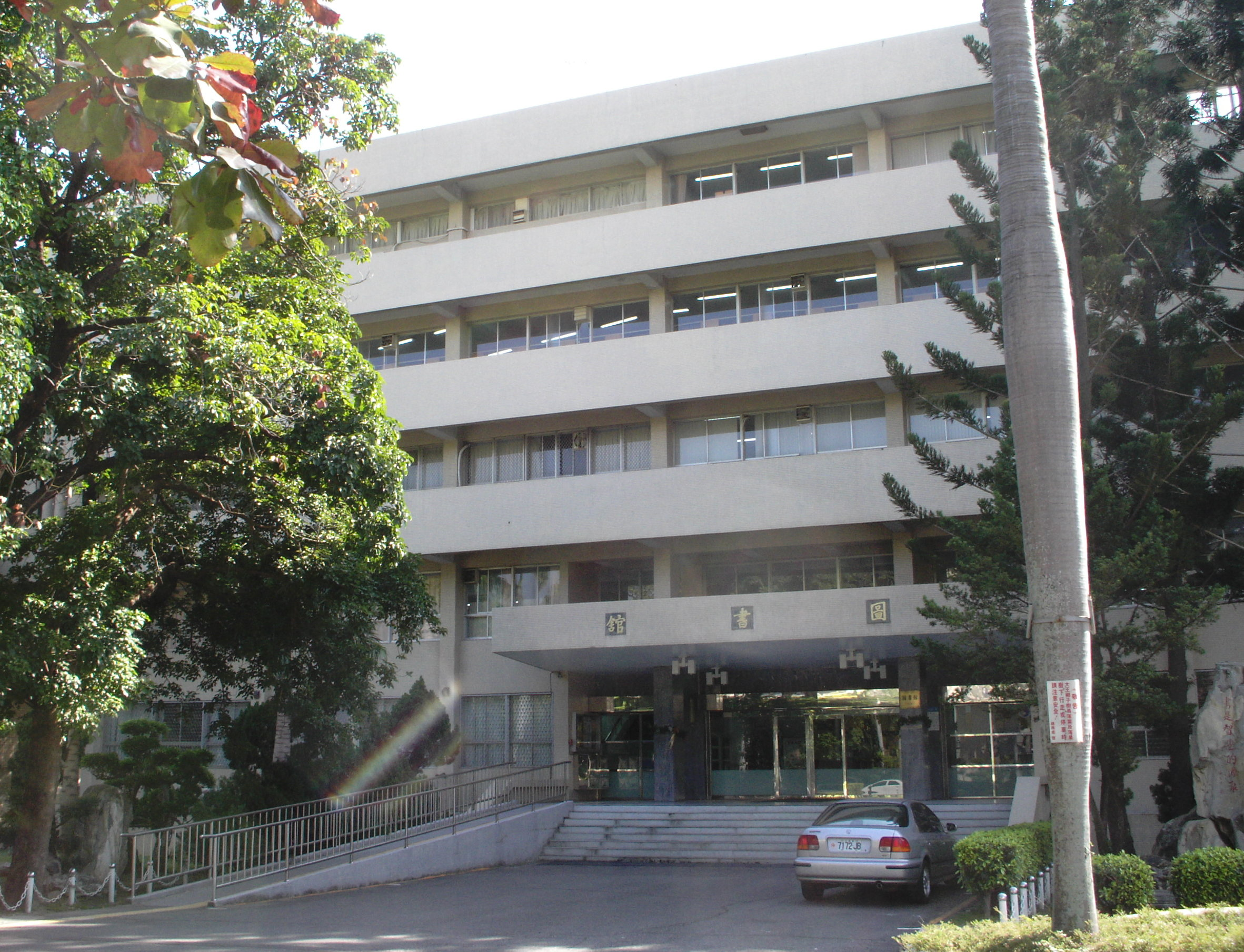
National Formosa University

The county is home to four universities: the China Medical University Beigang Campus, the National Formosa University and National Yunlin University of Science and Technology. There are 8 public senior high schools, 9 private high schools, 32 junior high schools and 156 elementary schools, as well as the National Yunlin Special Education School.

To promote lifelong learning, the Yunlin County Government established a community university in 2001 with 6 learning centers to offer county residents more opportunities.

Senior High Schools

Public Schools

National Beigang Agricultural & Industrial Vocational Senior High School

National Beigang Senior High School

National Huwei Agricultural & Industrial Vocational Senior High School

National Huwei Senior High School

National Tou-liu School Of Home Economic & Commerce

National Tou-liu Senior High School

National Tuku School Of Home Economic & Commerce

Yunlin County Mailiao High School

Yunlin County Tounan Senior High School

Private Schools

Bliss And Wisdom Senior High School

Da-cheng Vocational High School

Dader Industrial And Commercial Vocational High School

Perpetual Help High School

Ren High School

Sacred Hearts High School

St.Vincent High School

Victoria Academy

Yang-tze High School

Yi-feng Senior High School

== Energy ==
=== Power generations ===
Yunlin County houses one power plant, the Mailiao Power Plant, in Mailiao Township. Commissioned in July 1999, it has a capacity of 4,200 MW and is the third largest coal-fired power plant in Taiwan.

=== Water supply ===
Currently, most of the county residence use groundwater as their water supply. However, in 2016 the Hushan Dam was opened in Douliu City in which its reservoir will soon supply the water needs for the county residence.

== Tourist attractions ==
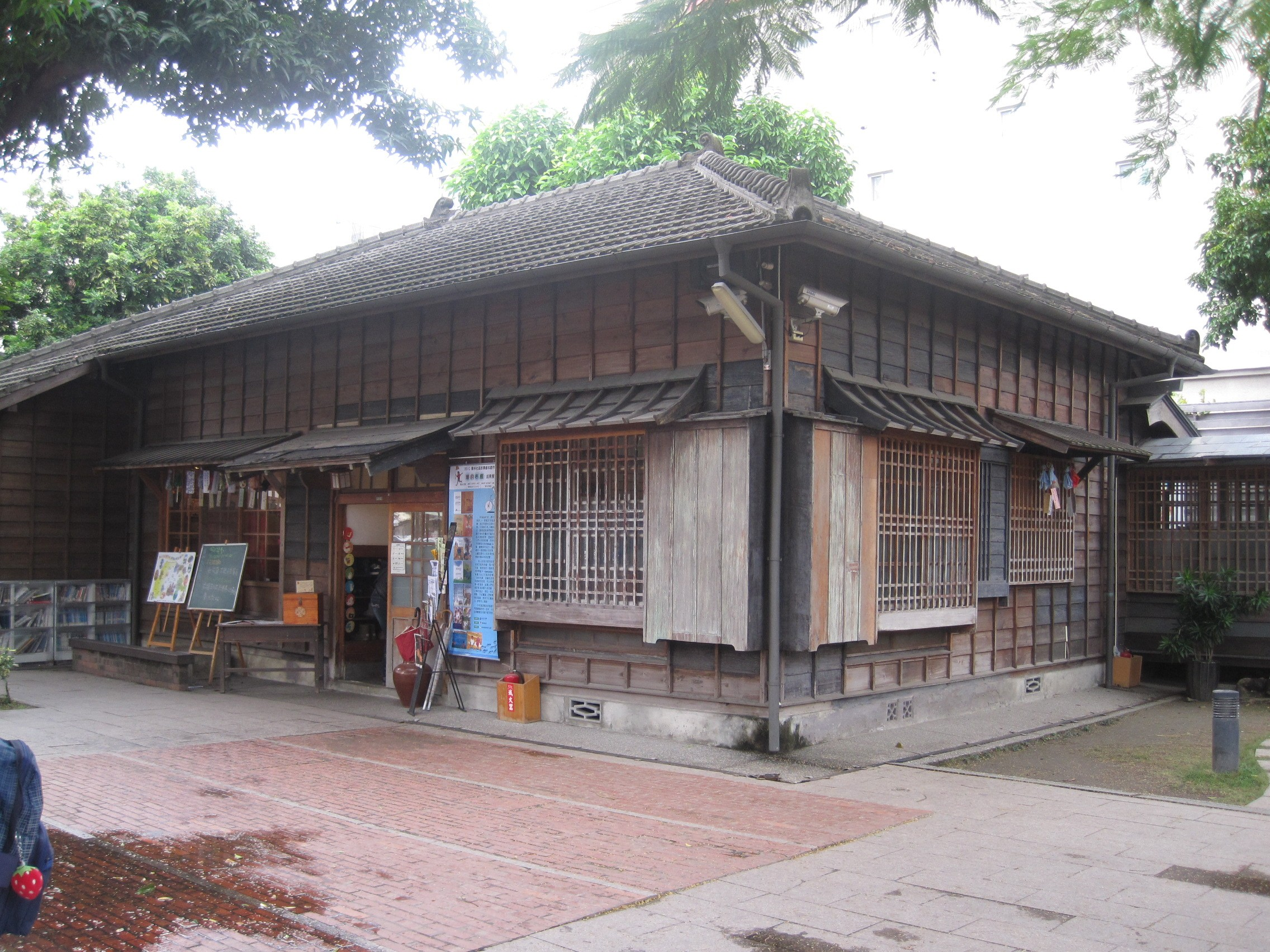
Yunlin Story House

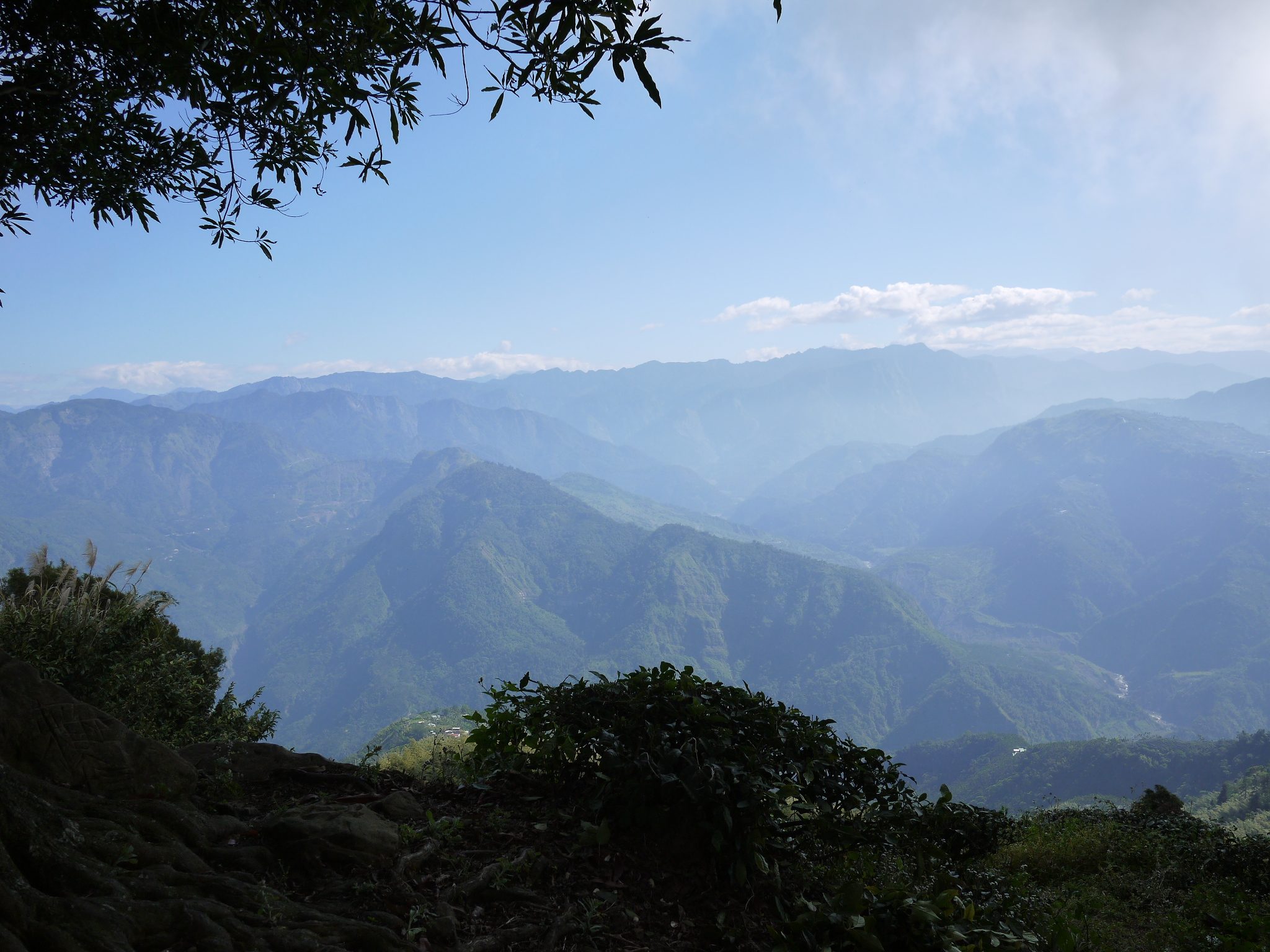
Caoling

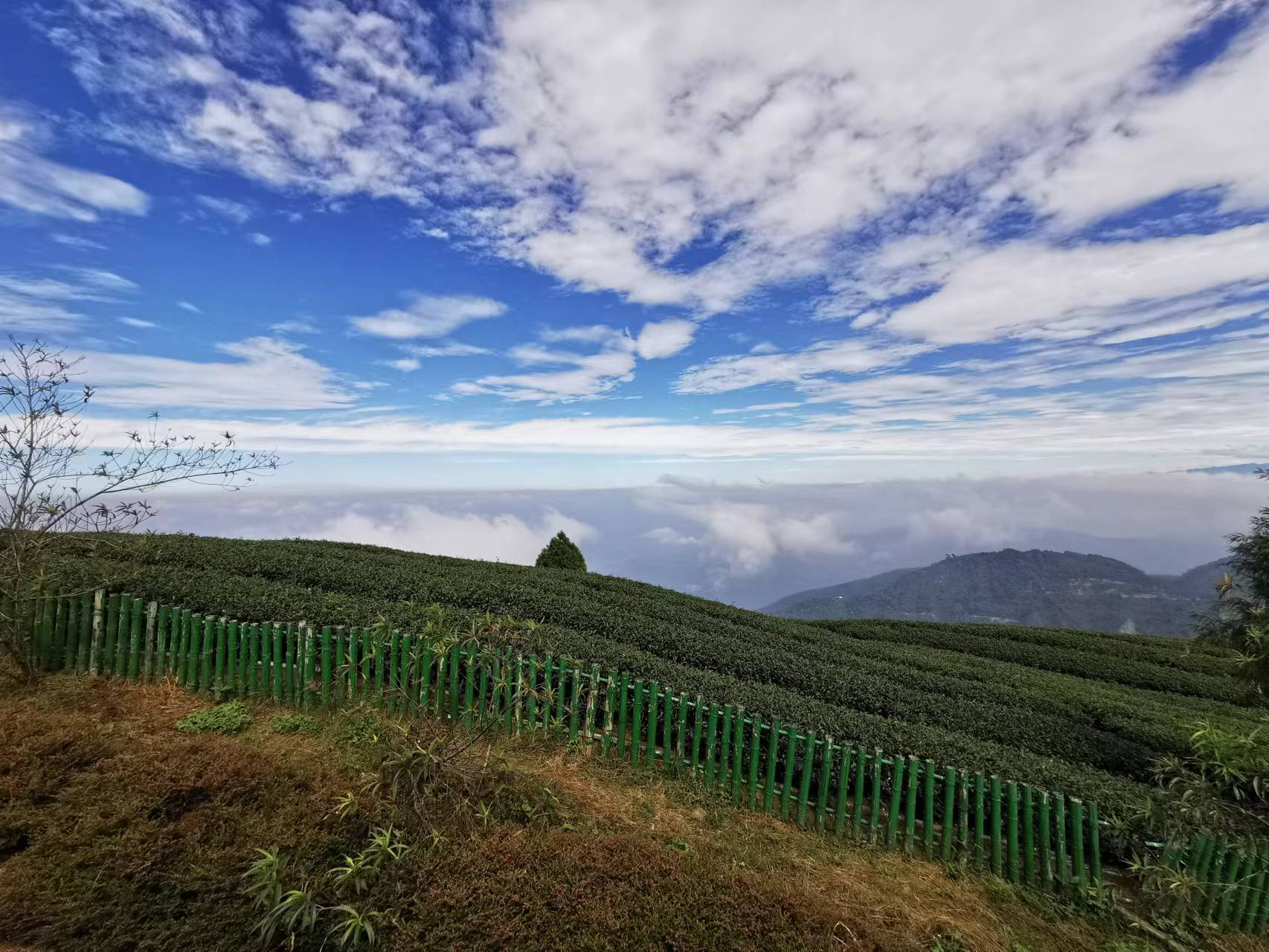
Yunling Hill

=== Historical buildings ===
Historical buildings in the county include the House of Citizen-Memorial Hall of Attendance, Jhen Wen Academy, Erlun Story House and Xiluo Theater.

Ma Min Shan Park Labyrinth

The first and largest temple theme park in Taiwan, the park is full of unique mountains and rocks. It features a large courtyard landscape of high mountain and stone forests, matched with scenic surroundings. There are a total of 73 characteristic landscapes in the area. The park includes the steep and eye-catching Rainbow Bridge. Tourists can climb up to a panoramic view of the park.

Xiluo Bridge

Xiluo Bridge is a highway bridge in Taiwan. During the Japanese Occupation, it was called Zhuoshuixi Bridge. It connects Yunlin County and Changhua County, and straddles the lower reaches of Zhuoshui River. It is designed with a Warren-style truss bridge. When it was completed in 1952, the Xiluo Bridge was the second longest bridge in the world after the Golden Gate Bridge in San Francisco in the United States. At that time, it was known as the "Far East First Bridge."

=== Scenic spot ===
- Caoling is a popular mountain scenic spot in Yunlin County.
- Yunling Hill is located at the intersection of three counties: Yunlin, Chiayi County, and Nantou County. It is a new mountain scenic spot, with an altitude of about 1,650 meters, offering a great view of sunrise, sunset and the sea of clouds.
- Green Tunnel Park is a long and narrow roadside park with a brick walking/biking path lined with mango trees. Next to the tunnel are tracks of a small sugar plantation railway. Its tracks, stations, and carriages were quite unique. The Gukeng Township Government has plans to restore the space as a cultural landscape park.

=== Temples ===
Prominent Temples in the county include;

- Beigang Chaotian Temple: one of the most important Mazu temples in Taiwan and known for its magnificent temple architecture, visited by more than a million pilgrims every year
- Beigang Wude Temple (北港武德宮): one of the largest temple dedicated to Xuan Tan Zhen Jun (玄壇真君), Martial God of Wealth
- Xiluo Guangfu Temple: prominent Mazu temple in Xiluo township
- Xiluo Fuxing Temple (西螺福興宮)： prominent Mazu temple in Xiluo township, have an annual procession during Mazu's Birthday
- Yong'an Temple: a popular temple dedicated to the Deity known as Kai Zhang Sheng Wang (開漳聖王)

=== Museums and cultural centers ===
Yunlin County is home to several museums and cultural centers, such as the Beigang Cultural Center, Farming and Irrigation Artifacts Museum, Honey Museum, Museum of Beigang Story, Soy Sauce Brewing Museum, Yunlin Hand Puppet Museum, Yunlin Story House and Zhaoan Hakka Cultural Hall.

Cheng Lin Agarwood Forest Museum

Chenglin Agarwood Forest Museum is located in Huwei Town, covering an area of about 5.8 hectares. It was the first largest agarwood forest park in the county. It has a Japanese Zen-style like Kenroku Garden and a simple style of ecological landscape pond. The garden is covered with more than 80 species of trees for viewing. The venue has a professional guided introduction and many thousand-year-old cypress artworks, as well as Chenglin's exclusive collection of the world's largest 3,000-year-old sacred wood.

Honey Museum

The Honey Museum (Bee Story House) is located beside Gukeng's Green Tunnel Park. The museum has exhibits on honey, bees, and honey tasting.

=== Festivals ===
Festivals, such as the Beigang International Music Festival, are regularly held in the county.

=== Theme parks ===
The Janfusun Fancyworld is a theme park in the county.

Chan Chau Ku is a dairy farm. Although there were quite a few dairy farmers in the area, there was no way for tourists to visit the parks. So the founder decided to build a leisure farm and open the park for free to encourage everyone to get close to nature.

=== Nature ===
Yunlin County houses the Chenglong Wetlands, Erlun Sports Park, Penglai Waterfall and Ten Thousand Year Gorge.

Hushan Reservoir

Hushan Reservoir is located in Douliu City and Gukeng Township, 10 kilometers southeast of Douliu City. Due to the small catchment area, the Tongtou River Barrage was built in Qingshui Creek. Water was diverted to supplement the water source.

Penglai Waterfall

Penglai Waterfall is located in Penny's Water Creek Valley on the east side of the Caoling settlement in Gukeng Township. It belongs to the Zhuoshui River Basin. The altitude of the waterfall is about 920 meters, and the drop is about 70 meters. It is listed as one of the ten scenic spots in Caoling.

== Transportation ==
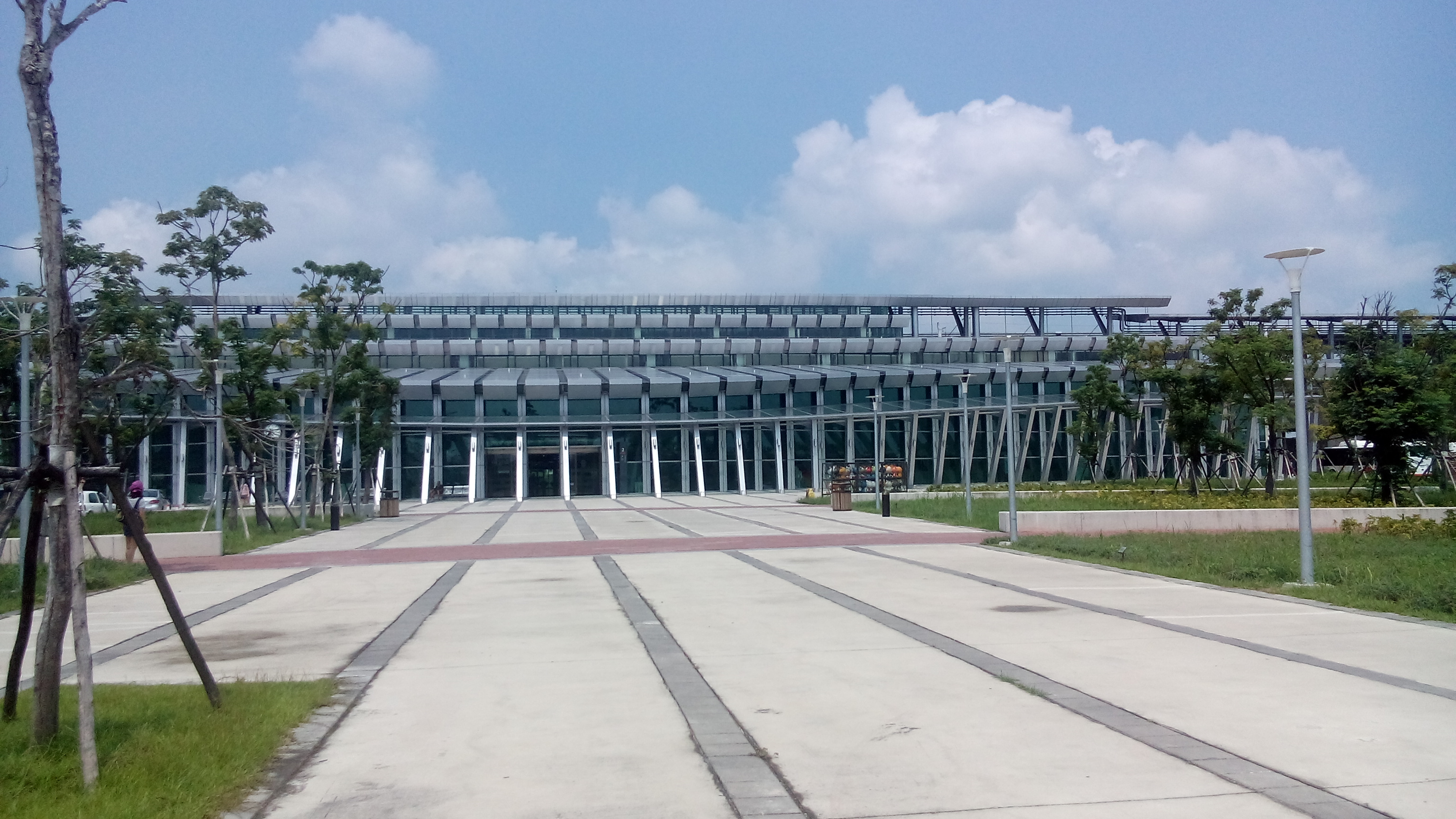
Yunlin HSR station

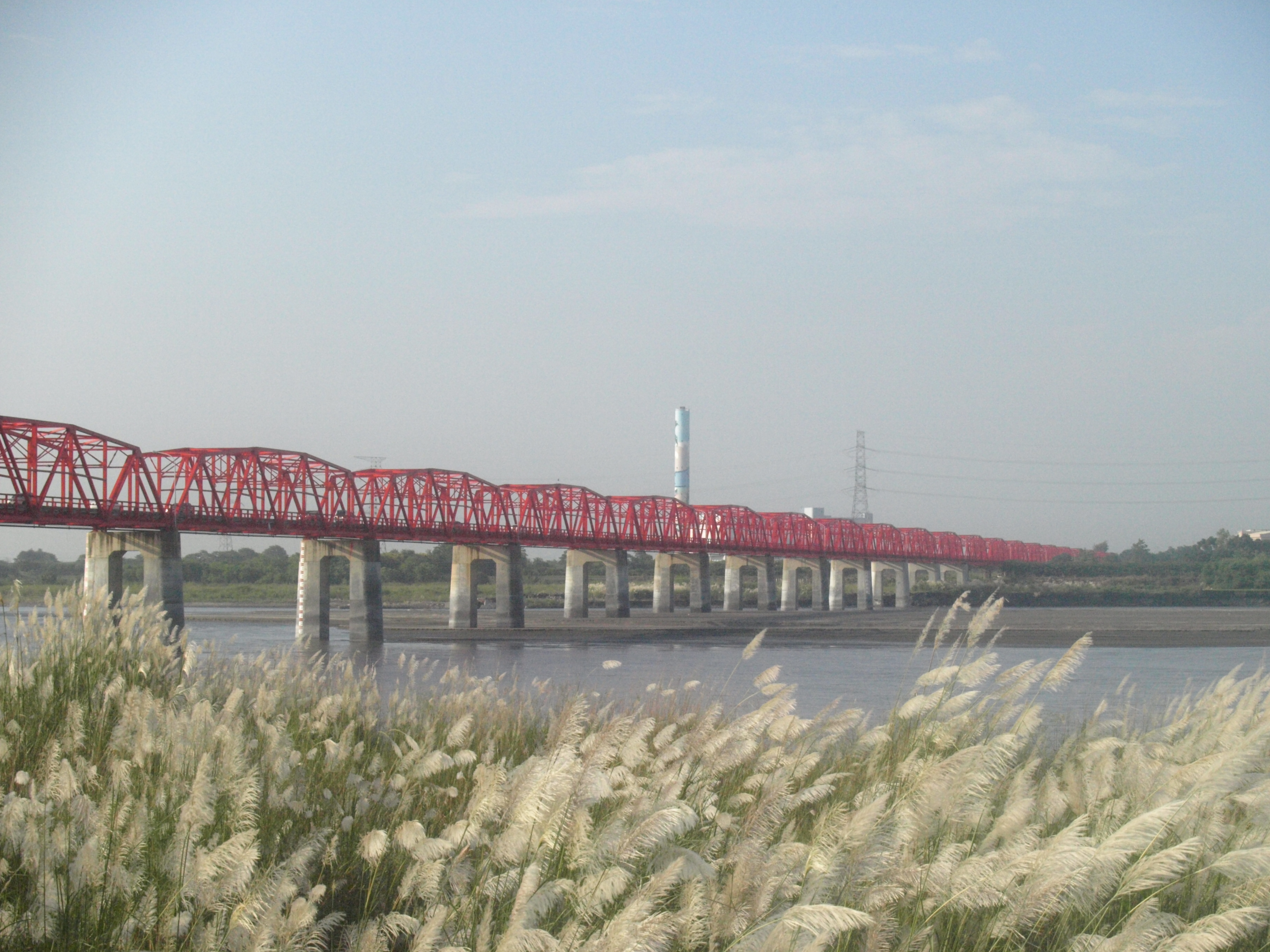
Xiluo Bridge

=== Rail ===
Taiwan High Speed Rail Yunlin Station is located at Huwei Township. Taiwan Railway has stations at Linnei, Shiliu, Douliu, Dounan and Shigui.

=== Roads ===
National Highway No. 1 and No. 3 pass through Yunlin County. Famous bridges in the county are the Xiluo Bridge, connecting the county to the neighboring Changhua County, and the Beigang Tourist Bridge, connecting the county to the neighboring Chiayi County.

=== Air ===
Yunlin County does not have any airport. The nearest airport is the Chiayi Airport located in neighboring Chiayi County.

== Notable people ==
- Teresa Teng (1953-1995), famous singer (born in Baozhong, Yunlin)
- Jason Wu, fashion designer (born 1982).

== See also ==
- List of Taiwanese superlatives
