= Yunlin County Government =

Government of Yunlin County, Taiwan

Coordinates: 23.6992°N 120.5263°E

- 雲林縣政府

Agency overview
- Jurisdiction: Yunlin County
- Headquarters: Douliu City
- Agency executives: Chang Li-shan, Magistrate; Xie Shu-ya, Deputy Magistrate
- Website: Official website

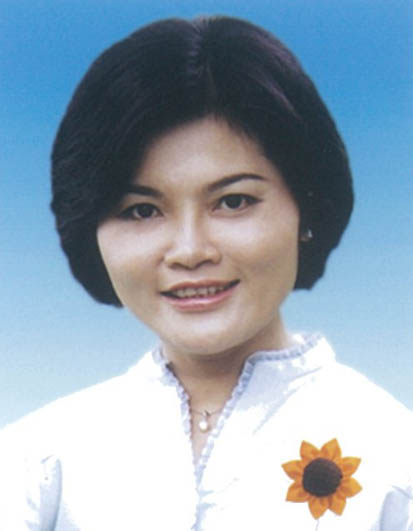
Chang Li-shan, the incumbent Magistrate of Yunlin County

The Yunlin County Government (traditional Chinese: 雲林縣政府; simplified Chinese: 云林县政府; pinyin: Yúnlín Xiàn Zhèngfǔ) is the local government of Yunlin County, Taiwan.

== Organizations ==
=== Units ===
- Civil Affairs Department
- Finance Department
- Economic Affairs Department
- Public Works Department
- Education Department
- Agriculture Department
- Social Affairs Department
- Labor affairs Department
- Urban and Rural Development
- Land Administration Department
- Information Department
- Cultural Affairs Department
- General Affairs Department
- Planning Department
- Personnel Department
- Budget, Accounting and Statistics
- Civil Service Ethics Department
- Water Resources Department

=== Subsidiaries ===
- Fire Safety Bureau
- Yunlin County Stadium
- Tax Collection Administration
- Police Bureau
- Environment Protection Bureau
- Health Bureau
- Domestic Animal Disease Control Laboratory
- Industrial Development and Investment Promotion Committee
- Procurement Center
- Family Education Center

== Building ==
The Yunlin County Government building consists of:

- Building No. 1
- Building No. 2
- Building No. 3
- Social Affairs

== See also ==
- Yunlin County Council
