= Douliu =

County-administered city in Yunlin County, Taiwan

Douliu 斗六市 Douliou, Touliu, Toroku
- County-administered city
- Douliu City
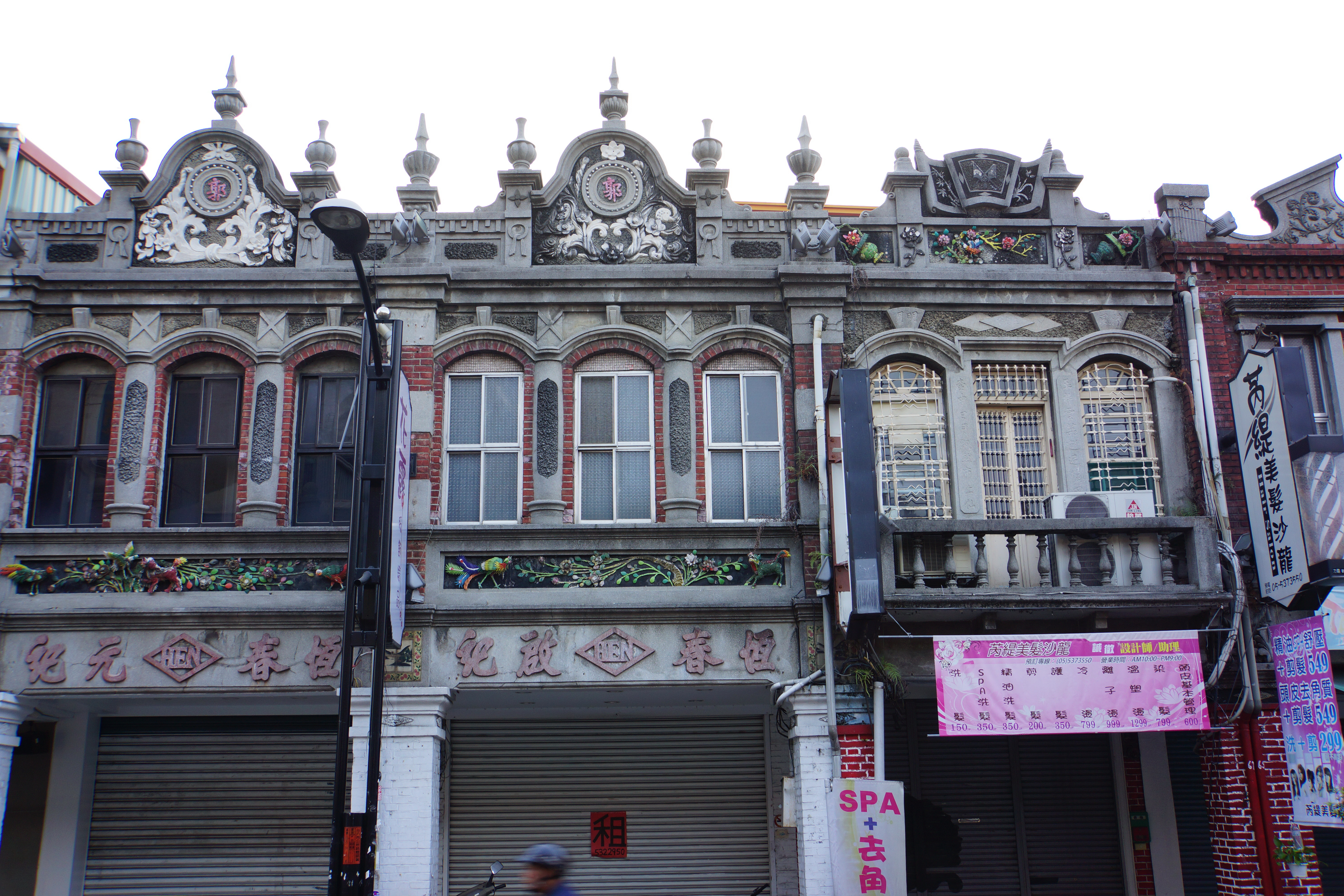
- Taiping Street

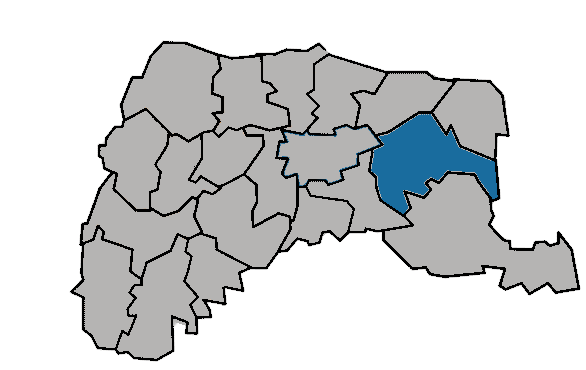
- Douliu City in Yunlin County

- Location within Taiwan
- Coordinates: 23°42′27″N 120°32′38″E
- Location: Yunlin County, Taiwan

Government
  - Mayor: Hsieh Shu-ya (謝淑亞)

Area
  - Total: 93.7151 km^{2} (36.1836 sq mi)

Population (February 2023)
  - Total: 107,924
  - Density: 1,151.62/km^{2} (2,982.68/sq mi)
- Households: 40,251
- Divisions: 38 villages, 747 neighborhoods
- Postal code: 640
- Website: www.dl.gov.tw

Douliu City
- Chinese: 斗六市
Transcriptions
Standard Mandarin
- Hanyu Pinyin: Dǒuliù Shì
- Bopomofo: ㄉㄡˇ ㄌㄧㄡˋ ㄕˋ
- Gwoyeu Romatzyh: Doouliow Shyh
- Wade–Giles: Tou³-liu⁴ Shih⁴
- Tongyong Pinyin: Dǒuliòu Shìh
- Yale Romanization: Dǒulyòu Shr̀
- MPS2: Dǒuliòu Shr̀
- IPA: [tòʊ.ljôʊ ʂɻ̩̂]
Hakka
- Pha̍k-fa-sṳ: Téu-liuk-sṳ
Southern Min
- Hokkien POJ: Táu-la̍k-chhī
- Tâi-lô: Táu-la̍k-tshī

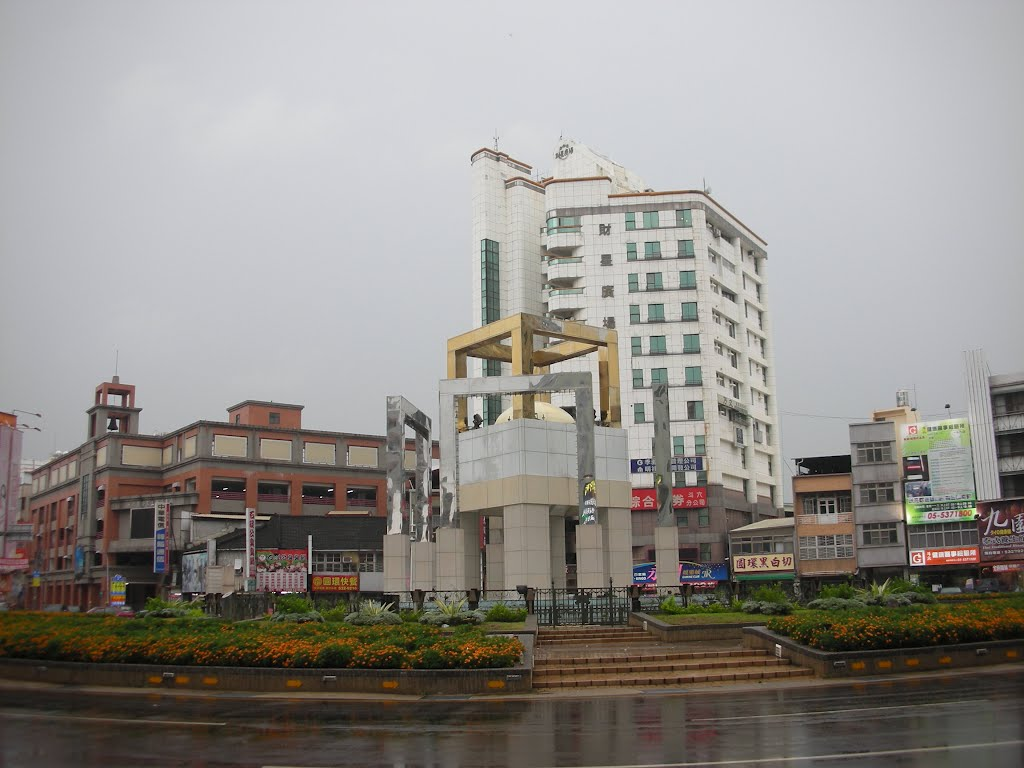
Douliu Roundabout

Douliu (Hokkien POJ: Táu-la̍k) is a county-administered city and the county seat of Yunlin County, Taiwan. It is also the political and economic center of the county. Douliu City is served by National Highway No. 3.

== Name ==
Its former name (Chinese: 斗六門; Pe̍h-ōe-jī: Táu-la̍k-mn̂g) came from a language of the Hoanya people, a tribe of the Taiwanese plains aborigines.

== History ==
=== Empire of Japan ===
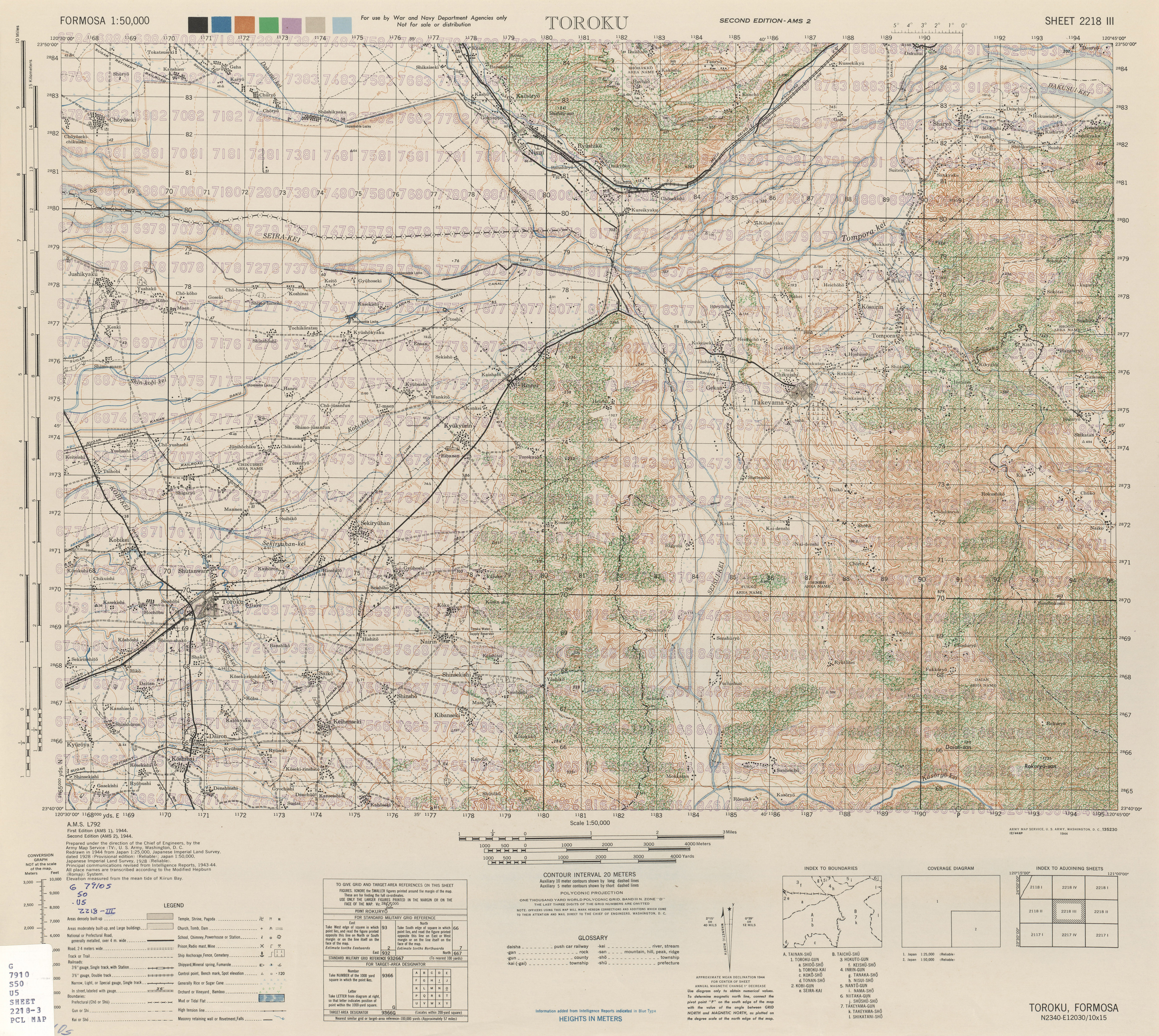
Map of Douliu (labeled as Toroku) and surrounding area (1944)

In 1901, during Japanese rule, Toroku Chō (斗六廳) was one of twenty local administrative offices established. In 1909, part of Toroku was merged into Nanto Chō (南投廳), while the remainder was merged with Kagi Chō (嘉義廳). In 1920, Toroku Town (斗六街) was established and governed under Toroku District (斗六郡), Tainan Prefecture. Toroku Town covered modern-day Douliu and Linnei Township.

=== Republic of China ===
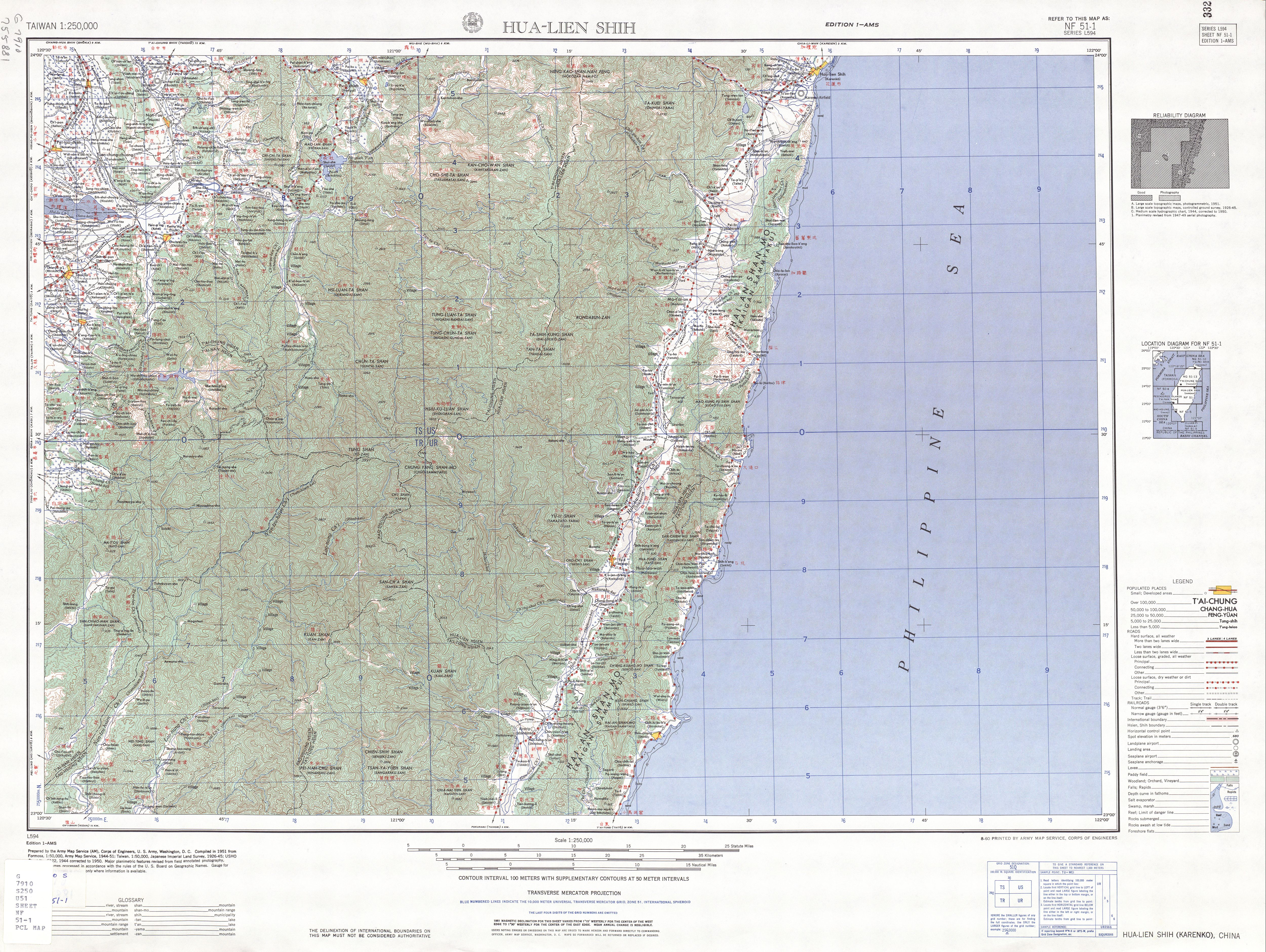
Map including Douliu (labeled as Tou-liu (Torkou) 斗六) (1951)

On 25 December 1981, Douliu was upgraded from an urban township to county-administered city.

== Administrative divisions ==
Xinyi, Siwei, Taiping, Zhonghe, Guangxing, Zengxi, Zengtung, Sanping, Mingde, Zengbei, Gongcheng, Zhongxiao, Renai, Bade, Gongzheng, Zhongguang, Lintou, Chenggong, Zengnan, Shekou, Longtan, Jiatung, Lunfeng, Gouju, Jiangcuo, Sanguang, Jiuan, Huxi, Baozhuang, Zhangping, Liuzhong, Liubei, Liunan, Meilin, Hushan, Zhangan, Xizhou and Shisan Village.

== Government institutions ==
- Yunlin County Government
- Yunlin County Council

== Economy ==
Douliu is home to the Douliu Industrial Park and the Yunlin Science Industrial Park.

== Health ==
- National Taiwan University Hospital Yunlin Branch
- Cheng Kung Hospital Douliu Branch
- Tzu Chi Douliu Clinic
- Hongyang General Hospital

== Places of interest ==
- Taiping Street: An old street featuring Japanese-era baroque buildings from three different periods. The street is a common location for special events and performing arts venues.
- Renwen Park & Sports Ground: (運動公園及人文公園) Located across from the National Yunlin University of Science and Technology, the park includes a skating rink, trails, etc. It serves as a public transportation, sports, and entertainment venue. It is also a common tourist destination during major festivals.
- Douliu Roundabout: Also called "Douliu Door", it is a landmark of Yunlin County. Water shows occur every evening with music.
- Yukihiro Memorial: In 1915 during Japanese rule, Crown Prince Hirohito (the future Emperor Showa) came to inspect the construction of public buildings. The area has been developed into a public space and community activity center.
- Toroku POW Camp Memorial: A memorial stone located at the Gouba Elementary School. It preserves the memory of POWs of the Japanese during World War II.
- Renwen Park Night Market: Located next to Renwen Park, a temporary night market sets up on Saturdays.
- Taiwan Temple Art Museum: (台灣寺廟藝術館)
- House of Citizen-Memorial Hall of Attendance
- Hushan Dam
- General Baokeng

== Festivals ==
- Yunlin Orange Culture Festival (雲林柳橙文化節)
- Pomelo Carnival (文旦嘉年華會)
- The Beigang International Music Festival (北港國際音樂文化藝術節) hosts music performances in the Yunlin County Concert Hall in Douliu during every festival.

== Sports ==
Douliu Baseball Stadium occasionally holds regular CPBL games and was also the venue for 2007 Baseball World Cup and Baseball at the 2008 Summer Olympics' Final Qualifying Tournament.

== Education ==
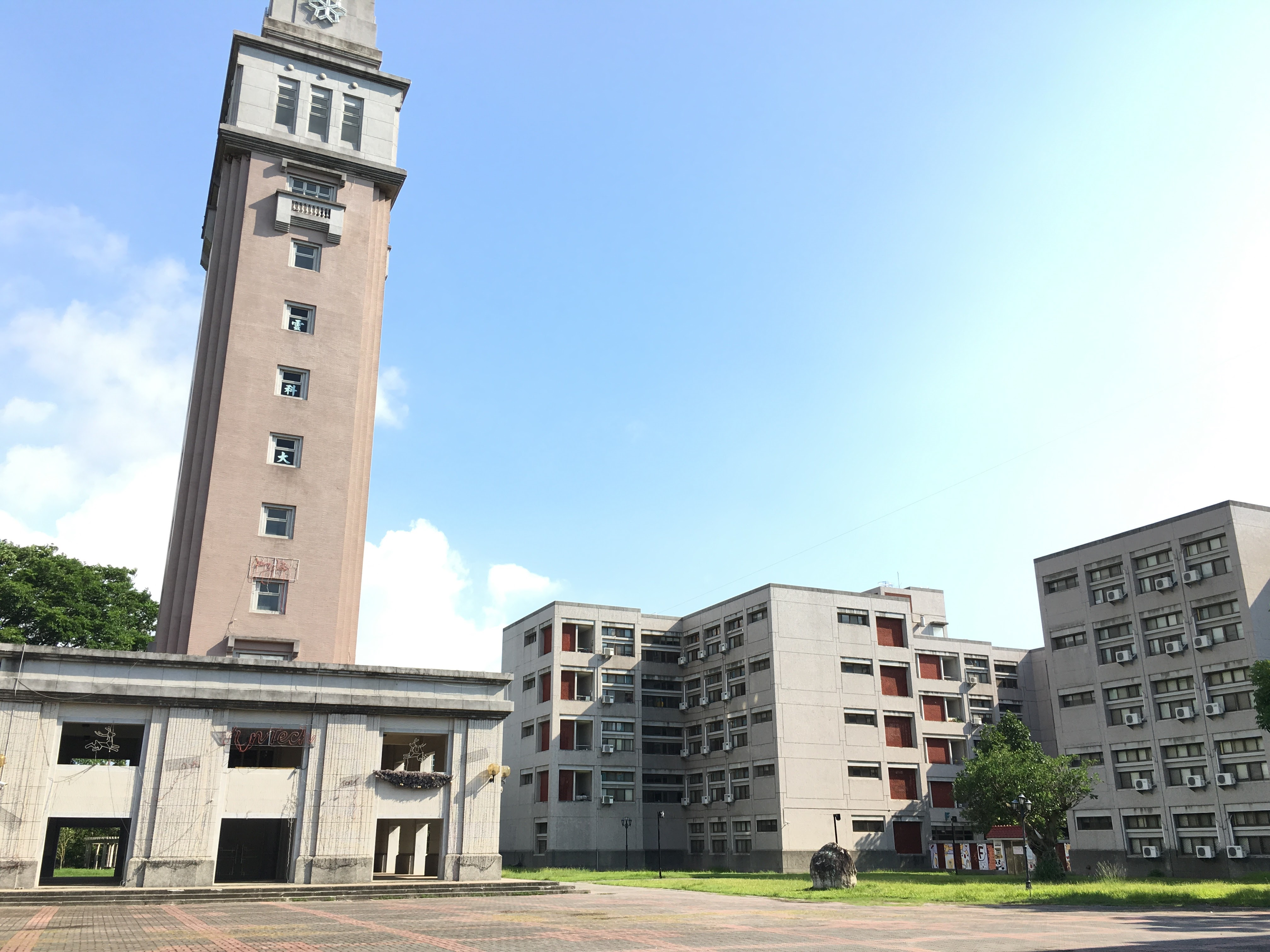
National Yunlin University of Science and Technology

- National Yunlin University of Science and Technology

== Notable natives ==
- Liu Chien-kuo, member of Legislative Yuan

== Transportation ==
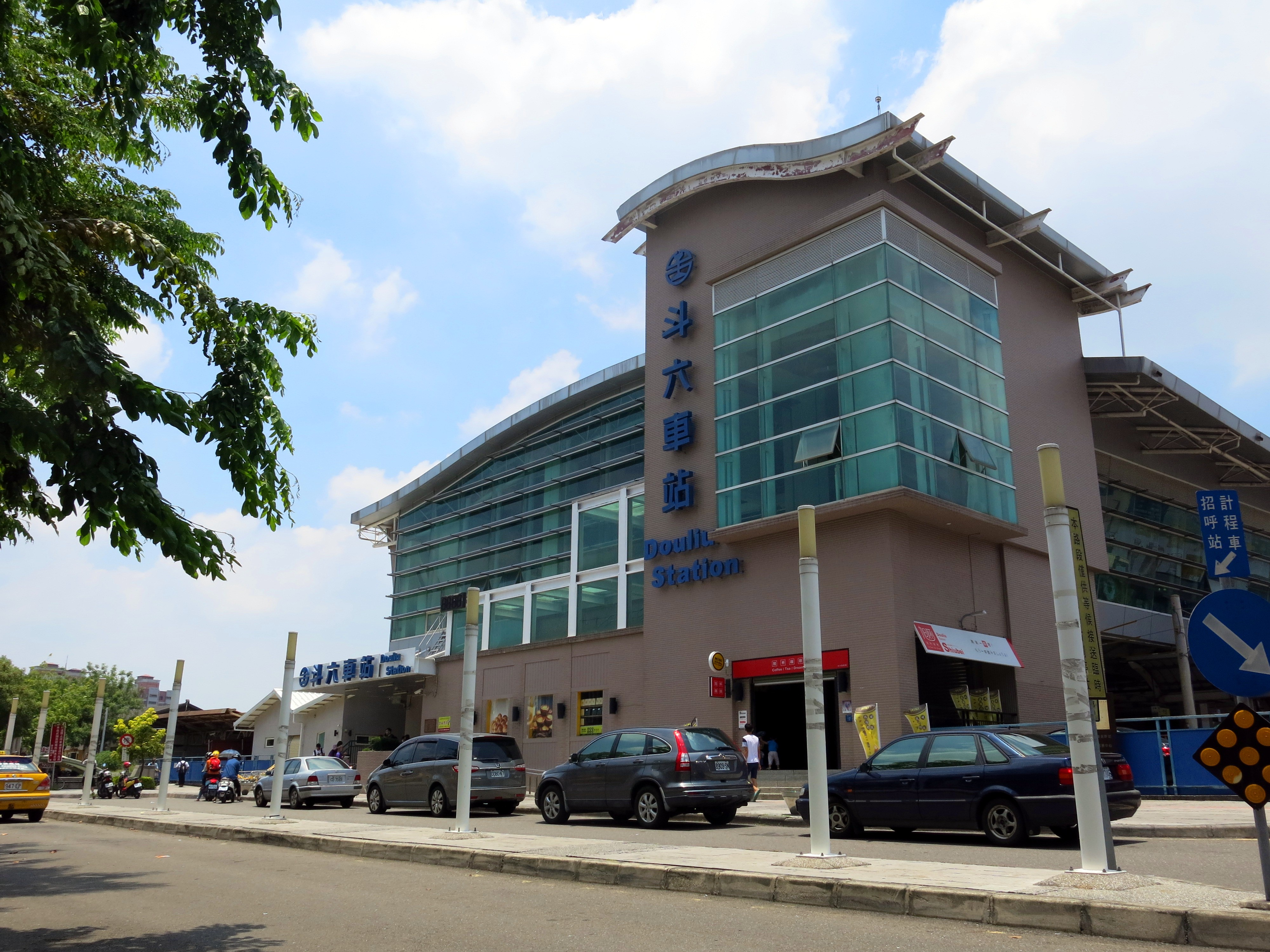
Douliu Station

=== Rail ===
Douliu is served through Douliu Station and Shiliu Station by Taiwan Railway. Douliu Railway Station opened in 1904, and Shiliu in 1905. It is also served via Yunlin HSR station by Taiwan High Speed Rail, located In Huwei Township. Currently, there is no rail connection from the HSR station to Douliu Railway Station.

=== Bus ===
- Taisi Bus
- Solar Bus

=== Road ===
- National Highway No. 3
- Provincial Highway No. 78
- Provincial Highway No. 1
- Provincial Highway No. 3
- County Highway No. 154

== Climate ==
Climate data for Douliu (2016–2023 normals, extremes 2016–present)
Month	Jan	Feb	Mar	Apr	May	Jun	Jul	Aug	Sep	Oct	Nov	Dec	Year
Record high °C (°F)	29.2 (84.6)	33.2 (91.8)	31.9 (89.4)	33.9 (93.0)	35.5 (95.9)	35.6 (96.1)	37.1 (98.8)	36.5 (97.7)	35.3 (95.5)	35.4 (95.7)	33.3 (91.9)	30.3 (86.5)	37.1 (98.8)
Mean daily maximum °C (°F)	22.4 (72.3)	22.6 (72.7)	25.3 (77.5)	28.1 (82.6)	30.8 (87.4)	32.6 (90.7)	33.7 (92.7)	32.8 (91.0)	32.5 (90.5)	30.4 (86.7)	27.9 (82.2)	23.9 (75.0)	28.6 (83.4)
Daily mean °C (°F)	17.1 (62.8)	17.6 (63.7)	20.3 (68.5)	23.5 (74.3)	26.6 (79.9)	28.2 (82.8)	28.9 (84.0)	28.4 (83.1)	27.9 (82.2)	25.6 (78.1)	22.9 (73.2)	18.9 (66.0)	23.8 (74.9)
Mean daily minimum °C (°F)	13.9 (57.0)	14.1 (57.4)	16.7 (62.1)	19.9 (67.8)	23.2 (73.8)	24.7 (76.5)	25.4 (77.7)	25.2 (77.4)	24.7 (76.5)	22.4 (72.3)	19.6 (67.3)	15.6 (60.1)	20.5 (68.8)
Record low °C (°F)	4.0 (39.2)	7.0 (44.6)	9.1 (48.4)	10.9 (51.6)	15.5 (59.9)	22.1 (71.8)	21.8 (71.2)	21.8 (71.2)	20.9 (69.6)	15.5 (59.9)	12.5 (54.5)	7.5 (45.5)	4.0 (39.2)
Average precipitation mm (inches)	36.2 (1.43)	27.7 (1.09)	60.4 (2.38)	66.2 (2.61)	164.1 (6.46)	358.1 (14.10)	319.8 (12.59)	379.4 (14.94)	179.6 (7.07)	29.4 (1.16)	19.7 (0.78)	32.2 (1.27)	1,673 (65.87)
Average precipitation days	6.0	4.4	6.8	6.7	9.4	14.6	14.9	17.0	7.8	3.1	3.1	3.4	97.2
Average relative humidity (%)	81.3	79.3	78.3	77.8	79.8	79.3	78.1	81.3	79.9	79.0	79.6	78.0	79.3
Source 1: Central Weather Administration
Source 2: Atmospheric Science Research and Application Databank (precipitation days and humidity 2015–2024)
