= Hyūga-nada earthquake =

Hyūga-nada earthquake may refer to:

- 1662 Hyūga-nada earthquake
- 1941 Hyūga-nada earthquake
- 1968 Hyūga-nada earthquake
- 2024 Hyūga-nada earthquake
