= List of earthquakes in 1982 =

Earthquakes in 1982
Approximate epicenters of the earthquakes in 1982
- 4.0–5.9 magnitude
- 6.0–6.9 magnitude
- 7.0–7.9 magnitude
- 8.0+ magnitude
- Strongest magnitude: 7.3 M_{w} El Salvador
- Deadliest: 6.3 M_{w} Yemen; 2,800 deaths
- Total fatalities: 3,388

Number by magnitude
- 9.0+: 0
- 8.0–8.9: 0
- 7.0–7.9: 8
- 6.0–6.9: 82
- 5.0–5.9: 1,417
- 4.0–4.9: 3,198

This is a list of earthquakes in 1982. Only earthquakes of magnitude 6 or above are included, unless they result in damage and/or casualties, or are notable for some other reason. Events in remote areas will not be listed but included in statistics and maps. Countries are entered on the lists in order of their status in this particular year. All dates are listed according to UTC time. Maximum intensities are indicated on the Mercalli intensity scale and are sourced from United States Geological Survey (USGS) ShakeMap data. The trend of below normal activity in the early part of the 1980s continued in 1982. The mid part of the year saw the bulk of the magnitude 7.0+ events. The largest event struck El Salvador in June and measured 7.3. This was a relatively modest magnitude as normally the largest events in a year are in the high end of the magnitude 7+ range or lower end of magnitude 8+ range. The number of deadly events was subdued for most of the year in line with the activity but spiked in December. Yemen suffered its worst event with 2,800 fatalities in a magnitude 6.3 event on December 13. A few days later Afghanistan had an earthquake which left 500 people dead.

== By death toll ==
Rank	Death toll	Magnitude	Location	MMI	Depth (km)	Date
1	2,800	6.3	Yemen Arab Republic, Dhamar Governorate	VIII (Severe)	5.0	December 13
2	500	6.6	Afghanistan, Baghlan Province	VI (Strong)	36.0	December 16
3	43	7.3	El Salvador, off the coast of La Libertad Department (El Salvador)	VII (Very strong)	73.0	June 19
4	13	5.9	Indonesia, Flores	VII (Very strong)	33.0	December 25
5	10	5.6	China, Sichuan Province	VII (Very strong)	10.0	June 15

Listed are earthquakes with at least 10 dead.

== By magnitude ==
Rank	Magnitude	Death toll	Location	MMI	Depth (km)	Date
1	7.3	43	El Salvador, off the coast of La Libertad	VII (Very strong)	73.0	June 19
2	7.2	0	Southern Tonga	IV (Light)	33.0	December 19
3	7.1	0	Philippines, Catanduanes	VII (Very strong)	45.7	January 11
3	7.1	0	Japan, west of the Bonin Islands	( )	536.0	July 4
3	7.1	0	Japan, off the east coast of Honshu	V (Moderate)	36.6	July 23
4	7.0	9	Mexico, Guerrero	VII (Very strong)	33.8	June 7
4	7.0	0	Australia, north of Macquarie Island	I (Not felt)	10.0	July 7
4	7.0	0	Solomon Islands, Santa Cruz Islands	II (Weak)	30.7	August 5

Listed are earthquakes with at least 7.0 magnitude.

== By month ==
=== January ===
January
- Strongest magnitude: 7.1 M_{w} Philippines
- Total fatalities: 0

Number by magnitude
- 8.0–8.9: 0
- 7.0–7.9: 1
- 6.0–6.9: 16
- 5.0–5.9: 112
- 4.0–4.9: 282

Date	Country and location	M_{w}	Depth (km)	MMI	Notes	Casualties	
Date	Country and location	M_{w}	Depth (km)	MMI	Notes	Dead	Injured
1	Japan, Bonin Islands	6.7	22.2				
9	Canada, New Brunswick	5.7	10.1	VII	Some damage was caused. This was an unusually large event for the area.		
11	Philippines, Catanduanes	7.1	45.7	VII	Some injuries were caused as well as some damage.		1
11	Canada, New Brunswick	5.4	7.0	VII	Aftershock of January 9 event. Some damage was caused.		
12	Honduras, Gulf of Fonseca	6.0	6.4	VII	2 people were hurt and some damage was caused.		2
18	Greece, Aegean Sea	6.8	10.0	VI			
20	India, Nicobar Islands	6.3	18.9	rowspan="2"| Doublet earthquake. At least 52 people were hurt and damage was reported.		52	
20	India, Nicobar Islands	6.2	27.0	VI			
20	Saint Lucia, east of	5.2	69.0	IV	6 people were injured whilst evacuating from a building.		6
23	China, Xizang Province	6.5	33.0	VII			
23	China, Xizang Province	6.0	33.0	VI	Aftershock.		
24	Philippines, north of Catanduanes	6.4	37.2	VI	Aftershock of January 11 event.		
30	France, north of Guadeloupe	6.0	63.3	V	Some damage was caused.		

=== February ===
February
- Strongest magnitude: 6.8 M_{w} Solomon Islands
- Total fatalities: 0

Number by magnitude
- 8.0–8.9: 0
- 7.0–7.9: 0
- 6.0–6.9: 2
- 5.0–5.9: 96
- 4.0–4.9: 243

Date	Country and location	M_{w}	Depth (km)	MMI	Notes	Casualties	
Date	Country and location	M_{w}	Depth (km)	MMI	Notes	Dead	Injured
10	Indonesia, West Java	5.5	39.8	V	17 people were injured and some damage was caused. $3.5 million (1982 rate) in costs were reported.		17
20	Solomon Islands, Santa Cruz Islands	6.8	36.0	VII			
20	Japan, Izu Islands	6.5	18.0				

=== March ===
March
- Strongest magnitude: 6.7 M_{w} Japan
- Deadliest: 6.1 M_{w} Peru; 3 deaths
- Total fatalities: 5

Number by magnitude
- 8.0–8.9: 0
- 7.0–7.9: 0
- 6.0–6.9: 9
- 5.0–5.9: 127
- 4.0–4.9: 256

Date	Country and location	M_{w}	Depth (km)	MMI	Notes	Casualties	
Date	Country and location	M_{w}	Depth (km)	MMI	Notes	Dead	Injured
11	Indonesia, west of Sumba	6.4	33.0	V			
21	Japan, off the south coast of Hokkaido	6.7	44.0	X	The 1982 Urakawa earthquake caused some damage with costs reaching $1 million (1982 rate). 110 people were injured. A tsunami was generated.		110
23	Peru, off the central coast	5.1	57.0	IV	2 people died and some damage was caused.	2	
28	Peru, Lima Region	6.1	95.0	VI	3 people were killed and some damage was reported. Costs were $5 million (1982 rate).	3	
29	Indonesia, off the south coast of Minahasa Peninsula, Sulawesi	6.0	187.2	IV			

=== April ===
April
- Strongest magnitude: 6.5 M_{w} Guatemala
- Deadliest: 5.0 M_{w} South Africa; 1 death
- Total fatalities: 1

Number by magnitude
- 8.0–8.9: 0
- 7.0–7.9: 0
- 6.0–6.9: 5
- 5.0–5.9: 102
- 4.0–4.9: 268

Date	Country and location	M_{w}	Depth (km)	MMI	Notes	Casualties	
Date	Country and location	M_{w}	Depth (km)	MMI	Notes	Dead	Injured
6	Guatemala, off the coast of Retalhuleu Department	6.5	64.8	VI			
13	South Africa, Orange Free State	5.0	5.0	VII	1 death and 20 injuries were caused by rockslides in a mine.	1	20
25	Soviet Union, East Kazakhstan Region, Kazakhstan	6.1	0.0		Nuclear test.		
27	Honduras, Comayagua Department	5.0	32.7	IV	Some damage was caused.		

=== May ===
May
- Strongest magnitude: 6.7 M_{w} United Kingdom, South Sandwich Islands
- Total fatalities: 0

Number by magnitude
- 8.0–8.9: 0
- 7.0–7.9: 0
- 6.0–6.9: 4
- 5.0–5.9: 118
- 4.0–4.9: 286

Date	Country and location	M_{w}	Depth (km)	MMI	Notes	Casualties	
Date	Country and location	M_{w}	Depth (km)	MMI	Notes	Dead	Injured
2	New Zealand, Kermadec Islands	6.5	25.4				

=== June ===
June
- Strongest magnitude: 7.3 M_{w} El Salvador
- Deadliest: 7.3 M_{w} El Salvador; 43 deaths
- Total fatalities: 62

Number by magnitude
- 8.0–8.9: 0
- 7.0–7.9: 2
- 6.0–6.9: 7
- 5.0–5.9: 100
- 4.0–4.9: 269

Date	Country and location	M_{w}	Depth (km)	MMI	Notes	Casualties	
Date	Country and location	M_{w}	Depth (km)	MMI	Notes	Dead	Injured
4	Poland, Silesian Voivodeship	4.6	10.0	VI	Some people were hurt and damage was caused.		1+
7	Mexico, Oaxaca	6.9	40.5	rowspan="2"| Doublet earthquake with 2 events about 4 hours apart. Some damage was caused in the first event. 9 people were killed, at least 101 were injured, and further damage occurred in the second event in Ometepec.			
7	Mexico, Guerrero	7.0	33.8	VII	9	101+	
15	China, Sichuan Province	5.6	10.0	VII	10 people were killed and another 5 were injured. Some damage was caused.	10	5
19	El Salvador, off the coast of La Libertad Department (El Salvador)	7.3	73.0	VII	Largest event in 1982. 43 people were killed in the 1982 El Salvador earthquake. 3 of the deaths were in neighbouring Guatemala. At least 101 people were injured. Major damage was caused in the area. Costs reached $5 million (1982 rate).	43	101
30	Soviet Union, Kuril Islands, Russia	6.9	33.0				

=== July ===
July
- Strongest magnitude: 7.1 M_{w} Japan 2 separate events
- Total fatalities: 0

Number by magnitude
- 8.0–8.9: 0
- 7.0–7.9: 3
- 6.0–6.9: 5
- 5.0–5.9: 112
- 4.0–4.9: 274

Date	Country and location	M_{w}	Depth (km)	MMI	Notes	Casualties	
Date	Country and location	M_{w}	Depth (km)	MMI	Notes	Dead	Injured
4	Soviet Union, East Kazakhstan Region, Kazakhstan	6.1	0.0		Nuclear test.		
4	Japan, west of the Bonin Islands	7.1	536.0				
7	Australia, north of Macquarie Island	7.0	10.0				
23	Japan, off the east coast of Honshu	7.1	36.6	V			

=== August ===
August
- Strongest magnitude: 7.0 M_{w} Solomon Islands
- Total fatalities: 0

Number by magnitude
- 8.0–8.9: 0
- 7.0–7.9: 1
- 6.0–6.9: 5
- 5.0–5.9: 127
- 4.0–4.9: 259

Date	Country and location	M_{w}	Depth (km)	MMI	Notes	Casualties	
Date	Country and location	M_{w}	Depth (km)	MMI	Notes	Dead	Injured
5	Solomon Islands, Santa Cruz Islands	7.0	30.7				
6	Indonesia, Flores	5.9	45.7	V	Major damage and landslides were reported.		
12	Papua New Guinea, off the east coast of New Ireland (island)	6.5	45.0	VI			
19	Panama, south of	6.8	10.0	V	3 people were hurt in Costa Rica.		3
26	Ecuador, Gulf of Guayaquil	6.1	70.0	V			

=== September ===
September
- Strongest magnitude: 6.8 M_{w} Japan
- Deadliest: 5.5 M_{w} Honduras; 3 deaths
- Total fatalities: 3

Number by magnitude
- 8.0–8.9: 0
- 7.0–7.9: 0
- 6.0–6.9: 11
- 5.0–5.9: 130
- 4.0–4.9: 250

Date	Country and location	M_{w}	Depth (km)	MMI	Notes	Casualties	
Date	Country and location	M_{w}	Depth (km)	MMI	Notes	Dead	Injured
6	Japan, Izu Islands	6.8	175.8				
14	Papua New Guinea, off the east coast of	6.4	36.8	V			
15	Peru, Puno Region	6.3	128.3	V			
29	Honduras, Ocotepeque Department	5.5	12.0	VI	3 people died and 2 others were injured. Major damage was caused in both Honduras and Guatemala.	3	2

=== October ===
October
- Strongest magnitude: 6.2 M_{w} Indonesia
- Total fatalities: 0

Number by magnitude
- 8.0–8.9: 0
- 7.0–7.9: 0
- 6.0–6.9: 2
- 5.0–5.9: 108
- 4.0–4.9: 313

Date	Country and location	M_{w}	Depth (km)	MMI	Notes	Casualties	
Date	Country and location	M_{w}	Depth (km)	MMI	Notes	Dead	Injured
5	Vanuatu	6.0	17.6	VI			
17	Italy, Umbria	4.4	16.4	VII	Extensive damage was caused with costs of $35 million (1982 rate).		
18	Italy, Umbria	4.3	10.0	V	Further damage was reported.		
18	Italy, Umbria	4.0	19.8	V	Further damage was reported.		
25	Iran, Semnan Province	5.4	33.0	V	Some people were hurt and some damage was caused.		

=== November ===
November
- Strongest magnitude: 6.7 M_{w} Peru
- Deadliest: 5.0 M_{w} Algeria; 3 deaths
- Total fatalities: 4

Number by magnitude
- 8.0–8.9: 0
- 7.0–7.9: 0
- 6.0–6.9: 5
- 5.0–5.9: 115
- 4.0–4.9: 226

Date	Country and location	M_{w}	Depth (km)	MMI	Notes	Casualties	
Date	Country and location	M_{w}	Depth (km)	MMI	Notes	Dead	Injured
15	Algeria, Tissemsilt Province	5.0	10.0	VI	3 people were killed and 14 were injured. 10 homes were destroyed.	3	14
16	Albania, Fier County	5.6	21.0	VIII	1 death and 12 injuries were reported. Major damage was caused with costs of $5 million (1982 rate).	1	12
18	Ecuador, Pastaza Province	6.6	195.0				
19	Peru, Pasco Region	6.7	14.0	VII			

=== December ===
December
- Strongest magnitude: 7.2 M_{w} Tonga
- Deadliest: 6.3 M_{w} Yemen Arab Republic; 2,800 deaths
- Total fatalities: 3,313

Number by magnitude
- 8.0–8.9: 0
- 7.0–7.9: 1
- 6.0–6.9: 11
- 5.0–5.9: 170
- 4.0–4.9: 272

Date	Country and location	M_{w}	Depth (km)	MMI	Notes	Casualties	
Date	Country and location	M_{w}	Depth (km)	MMI	Notes	Dead	Injured
3	Vanuatu	6.6	256.7	IV			
5	Soviet Union, East Kazakhstan Region, Kazakhstan	6.1	0.0		Nuclear test.		
13	Yemen Arab Republic, Dhamar Governorate	6.3	5.0	VIII	Deadliest event in 1982. The 1982 North Yemen earthquake was an unusually destructive event for the country. Earthquakes normally occur off the coast of Yemen. This event left 2,800 people dead and around 1,500 injured. A substantial amount of property damage was reported. $2 billion (1982 rate) in costs were reported.	2,800	1,500
16	Afghanistan, Baghlan Province	6.6	36.0	VI	500 people were killed and 3,000 were injured. Major damage was caused.	500	3,000
16	Cuba, Matanzas Province	4.5	33.0	IV	6 people were injured.		6
17	Japan, southwest Ryukyu Islands	6.5	86.9	V			
19	Tonga, south of	7.2	33.0	IV			
25	Indonesia, Flores	5.9	33.0	VII	The 1982 Flores earthquake caused 13 deaths and 390 injuries. 1,875 homes were destroyed. Damage costs were $1.45 million (1982 rate).	13	390
28	Japan, Izu Islands	6.3	22.0	VI			
29	Yemen Arab Republic, Dhamar Governorate	5.3	5.0	VII	Aftershock of December 13 event. 6 people were hurt and further damage was caused.		6
31	Chile, Antofagasta Region	6.0	118.0	IV			
