= New Caoling Lake =

Former lake in Taiwan

- 新草嶺潭 (Chinese)
- Location within Taiwan
- Location: Gukeng, Yunlin and Meishan, Chiayi
- Coordinates: 23.5759°N 120.6934°E
- Type: Barrier lake
- River sources: Qingshui River
- First flooded: September 21, 1999
- Max. length: 5 km (3.1 mi)
- Max. depth: 58 m (190 ft)
- Water volume: 46,000,000 m^{3} (1.6×10^{9} cu ft)

New Caoling Lake (Chinese: 新草嶺潭; pinyin: Xīn Cǎolǐng Tán) (Note: The name "Caoling Lake" typically refers to all four instances of this lake, while "New Caoling Lake" only refers to the 1999-2004 lake.) was a short-lived barrier lake on the border of Gukeng, Yunlin County and Meishan, Chiayi County, near the village of Caoling in Taiwan. Located on the Qingshui River, a tributary of the Zhuoshui River, the lake formed due to a landslide during the 1999 Jiji earthquake on September 21, 1999. The lake disappeared during a flood caused by Typhoon Mindulle in July 2004.

== Past lakes ==
The area around Caoling is mountainous and prone to landslides. Historically, there have been four instances of barrier lakes forming in this area. The first recorded instance was during the 1862 Tainan earthquake, and lasted until 1898. During the 1941 Chungpu earthquake, a landslide formed a 70 m tall dam; in 1942, another landslide caused the dam to grow to 170 m tall. On 18 May 1951, the dam abruptly failed, killing hundreds of people downstream, including 74 soldiers constructing a road up to the lake. On 15 August 1979, a landslide caused by 1979 typhoons caused a lake to form, which failed on 24 August the same year.

== History ==
During the 1999 Jiji earthquake on September 21, 1999, a landslide west of Caoling formed a 50 m tall barrier that once again dammed up the Qingshui River. After the earthquake, the Water Resources Agency announced that the lake's dam was stable, and the newly formed lake could potentially be used as a reservoir and serve as a substitute for Shigang Dam, which was damaged in the earthquake. However, this plan was never carried out.

Though the lake covered over some of Caoling's scenic attractions, the new lake was still popular among tourists. However, the lake was short-lived, as sedimentation gradually raised the lake's floor. Also, water channels formed on the dam, which decreased the retention time of the water. In July 2004, a flood caused by Typhoon Mindulle (known as the Seven-Two Flood) raised the lake's surface above the dam, washing away the barrier and returning the river to its original state.
