= List of earthquakes in 1941 =

Earthquakes in 1941
Approximate epicenters of the earthquakes in 1941
- 4.0–5.9 magnitude
- 6.0–6.9 magnitude
- 7.0–7.9 magnitude
- 8.0+ magnitude
- Strongest: Azores–Gibraltar transform fault, (Magnitude 8.0) November 25
- Deadliest: Saudi Arabia Jizan Region (Magnitude 6.2) January 11 1,200 deaths
- Total fatalities: 2,955

Number by magnitude
- 9.0+: 0

This is a list of earthquakes in 1941. Only magnitude 6.0 or greater earthquakes appear on the list. Lower magnitude events are included if they have caused death, injury or damage. Events which occurred in remote areas will be excluded from the list as they wouldn't have generated significant media interest. All dates are listed according to UTC time. With 1,200 lives lost, Saudi Arabia experienced the heaviest death toll on January 11. Other deadly quakes occurred in Iran, Turkey, Taiwan, Burma, and China. There were 15 magnitude 7.0+ events altogether. The largest event was in the north Atlantic Ocean at the Azores–Gibraltar transform fault in November with a magnitude 8.0. Other large events struck India, Japan, and Mexico to name a few. Australia saw a couple of unusually large quakes this year.

== Overall ==
=== By death toll ===
Rank	Death toll	Magnitude	Location	MMI	Depth (km)	Date
1	1,200	6.2	Saudi Arabia, Jizan Region	VIII (Severe)	35.0	January 11
2	730	6.3	Iran, South Khorasan Province	( )	15.0	February 16
3	430	6.0	Turkey, Agri Province	VIII (Severe)	35.0	September 10
4	319	7.3	Empire of Japan, Tainan City	( )	15.0	December 16
5	132	6.0	China, Heilongjiang Province	VIII (Severe)	35.0	May 5
6	51	7.2	China, Yunnan Province	VIII (Severe)	10.0	December 26
7	50	6.9	China, Yunnan Province	IX (Violent)	25.0	May 16
= 8	15	6.0	China, Sichuan Province	VIII (Severe)	0.0	October 8
= 8	15	5.9	Turkey, Erzincan Province	VIII (Severe)	70.0	November 12

- Note: At least 10 casualties

=== By magnitude ===
Rank	Magnitude	Death toll	Location	MMI	Depth (km)	Date
1	8.0	0	Azores–Gibraltar Transform Fault	IX (Violent)	10.0	November 25
2	7.9	2	Empire of Japan, east of Kyushu	( )	35.0	November 18
= 3	7.6	0	Mexico, Michoacan	VII (Very strong)	30.0	April 15
= 3	7.6	1	British Raj, Andaman Islands	( )	20.0	June 26
= 4	7.4	4	New Guinea, off the northeast coast of New Britain	( )	15.0	January 13
= 4	7.4	0	United Kingdom, Santa Cruz Islands	( )	35.0	May 17
= 4	7.4	0	Dutch East Indies, Minahassa Peninsula, Sulawesi	( )	35.0	November 8
= 5	7.3	6	Costa Rica, Puntarenas Province	IV (Light)	20.0	December 5
= 5	7.3	319	Empire of Japan, Tainan City	( )	15.0	December 16
= 6	7.2	0	Argentina, Jujuy Province	( )	200.0	April 3
= 6	7.2	0	New Zealand, Kermadec Islands	( )	35.0	August 2
= 6	7.2	51	China, Yunnan Province	VIII (Severe)	10.0	December 26
7	7.1	0	United Kingdom, South Sandwich Islands	( )	35.0	November 15
= 8	7.0	0	Philippines, south of Luzon	( )	15.0	November 5
= 8	7.0	0	Costa Rica, off the west coast of	( )	15.0	December 6

- Note: At least 7.0 magnitude

== Notable events ==
=== January ===
January
- Strongest: 7.4 M_{w} Australia
- Deadliest: 6.2 M_{w} Saudi Arabia; 1,200 deaths
- Total fatalities: 1,204

Number by magnitude
- 8.0–8.9: 0
- 7.0–7.9: 1
- 6.0–6.9: 13

Date	Country and location	M_{w}	Depth (km)	MMI	Notes	Casualties	
Date	Country and location	M_{w}	Depth (km)	MMI	Notes	Dead	Injured
2	Dutch East Indies, Celebes Sea	6.2	500.0				
4	Dutch East Indies, south of Sulawesi	6.0	50.0				
5	Dutch East Indies, north of Minahassa Peninsula, Sulawesi	6.7	25.0				
6	Nicaragua, off the west coast of	6.0	60.0				
7	Dutch East Indies, Gulf of Tomini	6.0	220.0				
11	Saudi Arabia, Jizan Region	6.2	35.0	VIII	1,200 people were killed and a further 200 were injured. 700 homes were destroyed and another 1,000 were damaged in the 1941 Jabal Razih earthquake.	1,200	200
12	Dutch East Indies, north of Minahassa Peninsula, Sulawesi	6.2	35.0		Aftershock.		
13	New Guinea, off the northeast coast of New Britain	7.4	15.0		4 deaths were caused. 1 home was destroyed and many sustained damage.	4	
20	British Cyprus, Famagusta District	6.5	100.0				
21	Bhutan, Trashigang District	6.6	15.0				
24	Peru, Loreto Region	6.5	120.0				
25	Fiji	6.5	370.0				
27	India, Assam	6.5	180.0				
31	Dutch East Indies, Banda Sea	6.6	100.0				

=== February ===
February
- Strongest: 6.9 M_{w} Philippines
- Deadliest: 6.3 M_{w} Iran; 730 deaths
- Total fatalities: 730

Number by magnitude
- 8.0–8.9: 0
- 7.0–7.9: 0
- 6.0–6.9: 9

Date	Country and location	M_{w}	Depth (km)	MMI	Notes	Casualties	
Date	Country and location	M_{w}	Depth (km)	MMI	Notes	Dead	Injured
4	Philippines, northern Bohol	6.9	605.0				
8	Dutch East Indies, Celebes Sea	6.5	35.0				
9	United States, off the coast of northern California	6.8	15.0	VI	Some damage was caused.		
9	New Guinea, east of New Britain	6.5	35.0				
11	Mexico, off the coast of Oaxaca	6.6	15.0				
16	Iran, South Khorasan Province	6.3	15.0		730 people were killed and major damage was caused.	730	
23	Dutch East Indies, Barat Daya Islands	6.2	170.0				
25	Dutch East Indies, Timor	6.7	180.0				
27	Dutch East Indies, Talaud Islands	6.6	50.0				

=== March ===
March
- Strongest: 6.5 M_{w} 2 events
- Total fatalities: 0

Number by magnitude
- 8.0–8.9: 0
- 7.0–7.9: 0
- 6.0–6.9: 6

Date	Country and location	M_{w}	Depth (km)	MMI	Notes	Casualties	
Date	Country and location	M_{w}	Depth (km)	MMI	Notes	Dead	Injured
1	Greece, Thessaly	6.2	35.0				
11	Afghanistan, Badakhshan Province	6.0	210.0				
14	Dutch East Indies, Flores Sea	6.0	550.0				
15	Mexico, Baja California	6.0	35.0				
16	Russian SFSR, Kuril Islands	6.5	25.0				
16	Italy, west of Sicily	6.5	100.0				

=== April ===
April
- Strongest: 7.6 M_{w} Mexico
- Total fatalities: 0

Number by magnitude
- 8.0–8.9: 0
- 7.0–7.9: 2
- 6.0–6.9: 7

Date	Country and location	M_{w}	Depth (km)	MMI	Notes	Casualties	
Date	Country and location	M_{w}	Depth (km)	MMI	Notes	Dead	Injured
1	United States, south of Kodiak Island	6.5	15.0				
3	Argentina, Jujuy Province	6.5	260.0		Foreshock.		
3	Argentina, Jujuy Province	7.2	200.0				
7	Jamaica, southwest of	6.8	15.0				
15	Mexico, Michoacan	7.6	30.0	VII	1941 Colima earthquake.		
18	Dutch East Indies, off the west coast of southern Sumatra	6.2	35.0				
19	China, Qinghai Province	6.0	35.0				
20	Tajik SSR, Districts of Republican Subordination	6.5	20.0				
29	Australia, Western Australia	6.3	15.0				

=== May ===
May
- Strongest: 7.4 M_{w} British Solomon Islands
- Deadliest: 6.0 M_{w} China; 132 deaths
- Total fatalities: 182

Number by magnitude
- 8.0–8.9: 0
- 7.0–7.9: 1
- 6.0–6.9: 10

Date	Country and location	M_{w}	Depth (km)	MMI	Notes	Casualties	
Date	Country and location	M_{w}	Depth (km)	MMI	Notes	Dead	Injured
2	New Guinea, southeast of New Britain	6.5	80.0				
5	China, Heilongjiang Province	6.0	35.0	VIII	132 people were killed and 203 were injured. 6,321 homes were destroyed.	132	203
6	Tajik SSR, Districts of Republican Subordination	6.0	60.0				
7	New Hebrides	6.6	160.0				
8	Fiji	6.7	580.0				
9	Philippines, Luzon	6.8	15.0				
15	Afghanistan, Takhar Province	6.0	230.0				
16	China, Yunnan Province	6.9	25.0	IX	Dozens of people (likely no more than 50) were killed and many homes were destroyed.	50	
17	British Solomon Islands, Santa Cruz Islands	7.4	35.0				
23	Turkey, Mugla Province	6.0	35.0				
24	Dutch East Indies, Aru Islands	6.0	35.0				

=== June ===
June
- Strongest: 7.6 M_{w} India
- Deadliest: 7.6 M_{w} India; 1+ deaths
- Total fatalities: 1+

Number by magnitude
- 8.0–8.9: 0
- 7.0–7.9: 1
- 6.0–6.9: 7

Date	Country and location	M_{w}	Depth (km)	MMI	Notes	Casualties	
Date	Country and location	M_{w}	Depth (km)	MMI	Notes	Dead	Injured
11	China, Sichuan Province	6.0	35.0				
16	Philippines, southeast of Mindanao	6.5	100.0				
18	Dutch East Indies, southern Molucca Sea	6.5	35.0				
18	Dutch East Indies, southern Molucca Sea	6.2	35.0		Aftershock.		
23	Dutch East Indies, West Sulawesi	6.2	35.0				
26	India, Andaman Islands	7.6	20.0		The 1941 Andaman Islands earthquake caused at least 1 death and 1 injury. Major property damage was caused. A tsunami was generated in the area.	1+	1+
27	Australia, Northern Territory	6.3	15.0				
27	Mexico, Tabasco	6.2	220.0				

=== July ===
July
- Strongest: 6.4 M_{w} United States
- Total fatalities: 0

Number by magnitude
- 8.0–8.9: 0
- 7.0–7.9: 0
- 6.0–6.9: 7

Date	Country and location	M_{w}	Depth (km)	MMI	Notes	Casualties	
Date	Country and location	M_{w}	Depth (km)	MMI	Notes	Dead	Injured
3	Argentina, San Juan Province, Argentina	6.2	35.0				
10	Chile, Arica y Parinacota Region	6.0	120.0				
12	India, Havelock Island, Andaman Islands	6.0	35.0		Aftershock.		
15	Japan, Nagano Prefecture, Honshu	6.0	35.0				
19	Japan, east of Kyushu	6.2	35.0				
23	Mexico, off the coast of Chiapas	6.0	35.0				
30	United States, southern Alaska	6.4	35.0	VI			

=== August ===
August
- Strongest: 7.2 M_{w} New Zealand
- Total fatalities: 0

Number by magnitude
- 8.0–8.9: 0
- 7.0–7.9: 1
- 6.0–6.9: 6

Date	Country and location	M_{w}	Depth (km)	MMI	Notes	Casualties	
Date	Country and location	M_{w}	Depth (km)	MMI	Notes	Dead	Injured
2	New Zealand, Kermadec Islands	7.2	35.0				
4	United States, Rat Islands, Alaska	6.8	90.0				
6	United States, northeast of Unimak Island, Alaska	6.8	150.0				
7	Tunisia, Kairouan Governorate	0.0	0.0		Minor damage was reported. The magnitude and depth were unknown.		
9	India, Andaman Islands	6.0	35.0				
14	Argentina, Jujuy Province	6.0	180.0				
30	(Empire of Japan) South Pacific Mandate, Northern Mariana Islands	6.5	35.0	rowspan="2"| Doublet earthquake.			
30	(Empire of Japan) South Pacific Mandate, Northern Mariana Islands	6.6	35.0				

=== September ===
September
- Strongest: 6.9 M_{w} 2 events
- Deadliest: 6.0 M_{w} Turkey; 430 deaths
- Total fatalities: 430

Number by magnitude
- 8.0–8.9: 0
- 7.0–7.9: 0
- 6.0–6.9: 11
- 5.0–5.9: 1

Date	Country and location	M_{w}	Depth (km)	MMI	Notes	Casualties	
Date	Country and location	M_{w}	Depth (km)	MMI	Notes	Dead	Injured
4	New Guinea, New Ireland (island)	6.7	30.0				
9	New Guinea, southwest of Bougainville Island	6.6	15.0				
10	Turkey, Agri Province	6.0	35.0	VIII	The 1941 Van-Ercis earthquake caused 430 deaths.	430	
12	New Guinea, Papua (province)	6.6	25.0				
14	United States, California, Nevada border	5.6	6.0	VII			
16	New Zealand, Kermadec Islands	6.9	70.0				
17	Dutch East Indies, Gulf of Tomini	6.9	205.0				
18	Peru, Apurimac Region	6.4	60.0				
24	Russian SFSR, east of Kuril Islands	6.5	15.0				
25	United States, Hawaii (island), Hawaii	6.0	0.0	VII	Depth unknown.		
28	United States, Alaska Peninsula	6.5	100.0				
29	New Hebrides, southeast of	6.5	60.0				

=== October ===
October
- Strongest: 6.4 M_{w} United States
- Deadliest: 6.0 M_{w} China; 15 deaths
- Total fatalities: 15

Number by magnitude
- 8.0–8.9: 0
- 7.0–7.9: 0
- 6.0–6.9: 3

Date	Country and location	M_{w}	Depth (km)	MMI	Notes	Casualties	
Date	Country and location	M_{w}	Depth (km)	MMI	Notes	Dead	Injured
3	United States, off the coast of northern California	6.4	10.0	VI			
8	China, Sichuan Province	6.0	0.0	VIII	15 people were killed and a further 10 were injured. 70 homes were destroyed.	15	10
15	Peru, Ayacucho Region	6.0	110.0				

=== November ===
November
- Strongest: 8.0 M_{w} Azores-Gibraltar Transform Fault
- Deadliest: 5.9 M_{w} Turkey; 15 deaths
- Total fatalities: 17

Number by magnitude
- 8.0–8.9: 1
- 7.0–7.9: 4
- 6.0–6.9: 4
- 5.0–5.9: 1

Date	Country and location	M_{w}	Depth (km)	MMI	Notes	Casualties	
Date	Country and location	M_{w}	Depth (km)	MMI	Notes	Dead	Injured
5	Philippines, south of Luzon	7.0	15.0				
6	New Guinea, Morobe Province	6.3	25.0				
8	Dutch East Indies, Minahassa Peninsula, Sulawesi	7.4	35.0				
10	Bolivia, Potosi Department	6.2	200.0				
12	Turkey, Erzincan Province	5.9	70.0	VIII	15 people were killed.	15	
15	United Kingdom, South Sandwich Islands	7.1	35.0				
18	Japan, east of Kyushu	7.9	35.0		The 1941 Hyūga-nada earthquake caused some damage. A tsunami struck the area causing 2 deaths and the destruction of 27 homes.	2	
24	New Zealand, Kermadec Islands	6.6	35.0				
25	Azores-Gibraltar Transform Fault	8.0	10.0	IX	1941 Gloria Fault earthquake.		
27	Dutch East Indies, Flores Sea	6.6	515.0				

=== December ===
December
- Strongest: 7.3 M_{w} 2 events
- Deadliest: 7.3 M_{w} Taiwan; 319 deaths
- Total fatalities: 376

Number by magnitude
- 8.0–8.9: 0
- 7.0–7.9: 4
- 6.0–6.9: 3

Date	Country and location	M_{w}	Depth (km)	MMI	Notes	Casualties	
Date	Country and location	M_{w}	Depth (km)	MMI	Notes	Dead	Injured
5	Costa Rica, Puntarenas Province	7.3	20.0	IV	6 people were killed and at least 101 were injured. Many homes were destroyed.	6	101+
6	Costa Rica, Guanacaste Province	6.0	35.0		Aftershock.		
6	Costa Rica, off the west coast	7.0	15.0		Aftershock.		
9	Dutch East Indies, Sulawesi	6.2	35.0				
13	Turkey, off the west coast	6.0	100.0				
16	Taiwan, Tainan City	7.3	15.0		319 people were killed in the 1941 Chungpu earthquake. 1,768 homes were destroyed.	319	
26	China, Yunnan Province	7.2	10.0	VIII	At least 51 people were killed and some homes collapsed.	51+	
