= 1991 Yemen earthquake =

- Location within Yemen
- UTC time: 1991-11-22 00:40:23
- ISC event: 314254
- USGS-ANSS: ComCat
- Local date: 22 November 1991
- Local time: 03:40 AST (UTC+3)
- Magnitude: 4.7 mb
- Depth: 10 km (6 mi)
- Epicenter: 13.887°N 44.068°E
- Areas affected: Ibb Governorate, Yemen
- Max. intensity: MMI V (Moderate)
- Casualties: 11 dead, 40 injured

On 22 November 1991, at 03:40 AST (00:40 UTC), a M_{w} 4.7 earthquake occurred in Ibb Governorate, Yemen. The epicenter was 7 km (4.3 mi) northwest of Dhi As Sufal and had a maximum Mercalli intensity of V (Moderate). Eleven people were killed and 40 others were injured from the earthquake. The worst-affected districts were Al Udayn and Hazm Al-"Udain. At least 1,578 buildings were destroyed and 7,150 were damaged.

== See also ==
- List of earthquakes in 1991
- List of earthquakes in Yemen
