= 1941 Jabal Razih earthquake =

Earthquake in Yemen

- Location within Yemen
- UTC time: 1941-01-11 08:31:48
- ISC event: 900618
- USGS-ANSS: ComCat
- Local date: January 11, 1941
- Magnitude: 5.8–6.5 M_{s}
- Depth: 35.0 km
- Epicenter: 16.4°N 43.5°E
- Areas affected: Mutawakkilite Kingdom of Yemen
- Max. intensity: MSK-64 VIII (Damaging)
- Aftershocks: 5.8 M_{s} & 5.2 M_{s}
- Casualties: 1,200 dead 200 injured

The 1941 Sa'dah earthquake or the Jabal Razih earthquake occurred on January 11 in Razih District of the Mutawakkilite Kingdom of Yemen. The earthquake had a surface-wave magnitude of 5.8–6.5 and a shallow focal depth. Despite the moderate size of this earthquake, an estimated 1,200 people perished and at least 200 injured. With a maximum MSK-64 intensity assigned at VIII, it destroyed many villages and collapsed homes in the region of North Yemen.

== Tectonic setting ==
Western Yemen is located near the southwestern point of the Arabian plate. At this location lies the Afar triple junction, where it meets the Nubian and Somali plates at three divergent boundaries. The three plates are rifting apart; extensional tectonics stretch the plates and eventually form new oceanic crust, in the case of the Gulf of Aden and the Red Sea, where active rifting is ongoing. The extension causes normal faulting to break within the crust and cause earthquakes.

The most recent major seismic activity related to the regional tectonics were a series of six magnitude 6.0+ earthquakes in Djibouti and Ethiopia in 1989. The largest shock had a moment magnitude of 6.5 and resulted in two deaths.

== Foreshocks ==
The earthquake was preceded by slight foreshocks that began days before the mainshock struck. A damaging foreshock occurred at noon on January 9, causing destruction in Al Hudaydah.

== Damage ==
The mainshock occurred at mid-day with an estimated surface-wave magnitude of between 5.8 and 6.2 while some estimates suggests it was up to M_{s} 6.5. This strong earthquake was felt in the Al Darb governorate of neighboring Saudi Arabia and as far as Assab in present-day Eritrea, then part of Ethiopia. In all, a total of 1,200 people were killed and some 1,700 homes were lost. Another 400 homes suffered damage so serious, they had to be demolished.

== Aftershocks ==
Many aftershocks were felt every day up until the second week of March. These aftershocks worsened the damage caused by the mainshock. Two large aftershocks occurred at 09:18 on 4 February and at 19:03 on 23 February. The first aftershock had a magnitude of 5.2 and was reported from Haidan, Khaulan, al-Zahir, and Wadi al-'Abidin near Sa'da, causing landslides. Damage was also reported from Abu Arish and Sabiya to the northwest and Harad to the southwest. The second aftershock of 23 February was reported from al-Hudaida, Bait al-Faqih, al-Sa'id, and Bura, and caused significant damage.

== See also ==
- 1982 North Yemen earthquake
- List of earthquakes in 1941
- List of earthquakes in Yemen
- List of earthquakes in Saudi Arabia
