= 1662 Hyūga-nada earthquake =

Earthquake in Japan

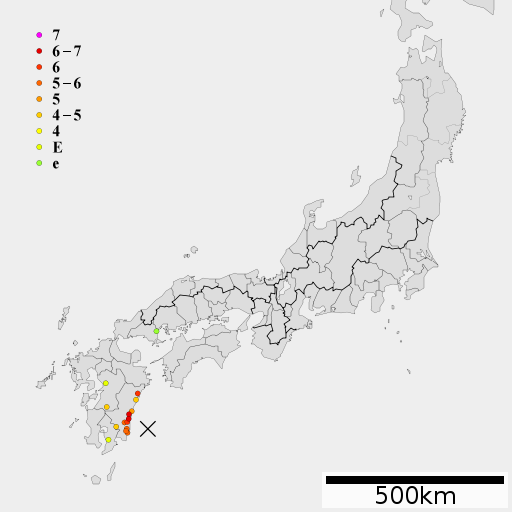
- Seismic intensity map

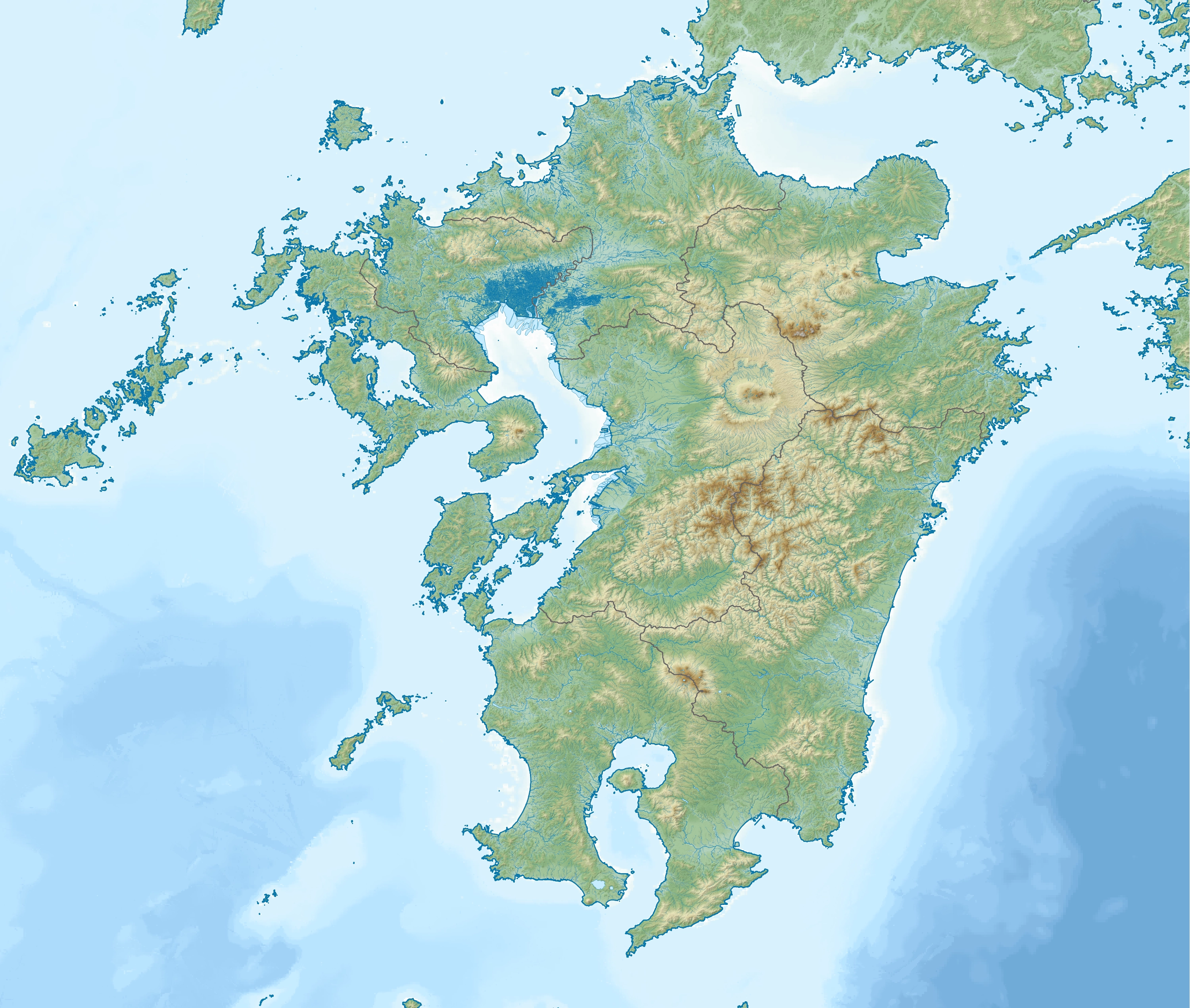
- Location within Kyushu
- Local date: October 30, 1662
- Local time: 23:01
- Magnitude: M_{w}7.9
- Epicenter: 31.7°N 132.0°E
- Areas affected: Japan
- Max. intensity: JMA 6
- Tsunami: 4–5 m (13–16 ft) (reported); 12 m (39 ft) (simulated)
- Casualties: 200 dead

The 1662 Hyūga-nada earthquake and tsunami affected southern Japan on 30 October at 23:01 local time. The earthquake, estimated at M_{w} 7.9, was considered the largest in the Hyūga Sea in recorded history. It produced strong coastal shaking corresponding to Shindo 6, causing damage to homes across Kyushu. The tsunami that followed reached 5 m (16 ft) in height, worsening the damage and flooding the coastline. Boats and ships were also destroyed. At least 200 people were reported dead. The earthquake was possibly associated with subduction beneath the Hyūga Sea.

== Tectonic setting ==
The Hyūga Sea is located at the southwestern end of the Nankai Trough, an active subduction zone. The Nankai Trough represents the plate boundary where the Philippine Sea plate subducts beneath the Eurasian plate. The area is associated with large earthquakes in 1968 (M_{w} 7.5) and 1996 (M_{w} 6.7 and 6.8). The Hyūga Sea is interpreted as a transition zone between the highly coupled Nankai Trough in the northeast and weakly coupled Ryukyu Trench further southwest. The 1968 and 1996 earthquakes were subduction zone events occurring on the plate boundary. About 2 km (1.2 mi) beneath the seafloor, low-frequency earthquakes occur near the shallow subduction interface. Beneath the east coast of Kyushu, on the deeper part of the subduction zone, slow slip events were detected between 1996 and 2017.

== Earthquake characteristics ==
The earthquake was associated with very strong shaking, of seismic intensity 6, at the coast. It also generated tsunamis of 4–10 m (13–33 ft) along Kyushu's coast. No other earthquake in the region has been associated with strong shaking and large tsunami waves within the last century. Previous studied have assigned the earthquake magnitude 7.6.

Researchers Yusuke Yamashita, Kei Ioki and Yoshihiro Kase postulated that an earthquake with a moment magnitude of 7.9 was required to reproduce the tsunami heights and ground motion through simulation. They proposed a fault model comprising three faults extending from the deeper seismogenic subduction interface to the shallow interface where slow slip events occur. The fault model measured 80 km (50 mi) along strike and 75 km (47 mi) in width.

Up to 8 m (26 ft) of slip occurred on subfault 1; the fault closest to the seafloor where its upper edge is 11.5 km (7.1 mi) beneath. On subfault 2, slip of 4 m (13 ft) was computed. The model predicted up to 2.64 m (8 ft 8 in) of vertical seafloor uplift and 0.46 m (1 ft 6 in) in subsidence. These parameters were required to reproduce the large tsunami reported in southern Miyazaki Prefecture. Furthermore, subfault 3, located at the deep interface, required 2 m (6 ft 7 in) of slip the severe damage along the coast from seismic shaking.

The tsunami model predicted a maximum height of 12 m (39 ft) around coastal Miyazaki. The simulation was consistent with discovered tsunami deposits and inundated areas where reports had been documented. The maximum elevation where tsunami deposits were found was 15 m (49 ft).

== Damage and casualties ==
About 200 people died including 5 to 20 in Beppu. At Beppu harbour, ten boats were destroyed. At least 32 km (20 mi) of the coast was flooded; 2,500 homes were destroyed and 246 were submerged. All of Kyushu was affected to various extent; the coastline between the Oyodo and Kaeda rivers experienced heavy losses; 1,213 homes were demolished. Ten ships transporting rice near the Ōsumi Peninsula sunk. In Miyazaki, the wave heights were 4–5 m (13–16 ft), based on documentation. In Sadowara, 800 homes were razed and the gates of Sadowara Castle toppled. Subsidence of 1 m (3 ft 3 in) occurred and changes in the Oyodo and Kaeda river currents occurred. The subsidence could be due to coseismic deformation, land subsidence or liquefaction.

== Memorial tradition ==
A memorial monument is erected near Miyazaki Prefectural Sports Park every 50 years to commemorate the event. The first monument was erected in 1701 and the tradition has continued. Since 2015, there have been seven monuments lined side-by-side. These monuments are managed by Saikyoji Temple. Construction of the eighth monument is expected in 2062.

== See also ==
- 1941 Hyūga-nada earthquake
- 1968 Hyūga-nada earthquake
- 2024 Hyūga-nada earthquake
- List of earthquakes in Japan
