= Ten Thousand Year Gorge =

Canyon in Gukeng, Yunlin, Taiwan

Ten Thousand Year Gorge 萬年峽谷
- Gorge
- Interactive map of Ten Thousand Year Gorge 萬年峽谷
- Coordinates: 23°36′04.5″N 120°39′56.8″E
- Location: Gukeng, Yunlin, Taiwan
- Geology: canyon

The Ten Thousand Year Gorge (traditional Chinese: 萬年峽谷; simplified Chinese: 万年峡谷; pinyin: Wànnián Xiágǔ) is a canyon in Gukeng Township, Yunlin County, Taiwan.

== History ==
The gorge was formed by the continuous erosion of stream to the bedrocks.

== Geology ==
The canyon has various geological variations and stream erosion. The stream that passes the gorge starts from Tongxin Waterfall (Chinese: 同心瀑布) on the upstream upstream and plunges over series of small waterfalls before plummeting over a much larger Dragon Phoenix Waterfall (Chinese: 龍鳳瀑布) at its downstream. Half way lies a large 10-meter deep Treasure Island Pool (Chinese: 寶島池).

== See also ==
- Geography of Taiwan
