= 1941 Gloria Fault earthquake =

Earthquake in the Atlantic Ocean

- Location within North Atlantic
- UTC time: 1941-11-25 18:03:57
- ISC event: 901098
- USGS-ANSS: ComCat
- Local date: November 25, 1941
- Local time: 17:03:57
- Magnitude: 8.0 M_{w}
- Depth: 10 km (6 mi)
- Epicenter: 37.446°N 18.953°W
- Fault: Gloria Fault
- Type: Strike-slip
- Max. intensity: MMI IX (Violent)
- Tsunami: Minor

The 1941 Gloria Fault earthquake occurred at 18:03:57 UTC in the northern Atlantic Ocean on 25 November 1941. It had a magnitude of about 8.0 on the moment magnitude scale and a maximum perceived intensity of IX (Violent) on the Mercalli intensity scale. It was caused by movement on the Gloria Fault, part of the Azores–Gibraltar Transform Fault. It triggered a small tsunami, which was observed at Newlyn, Cornwall.

== See also ==
- List of earthquakes in 1941
