= 2024 Hyūga-nada earthquake =

Earthquake in Miyazaki Prefecture, Japan

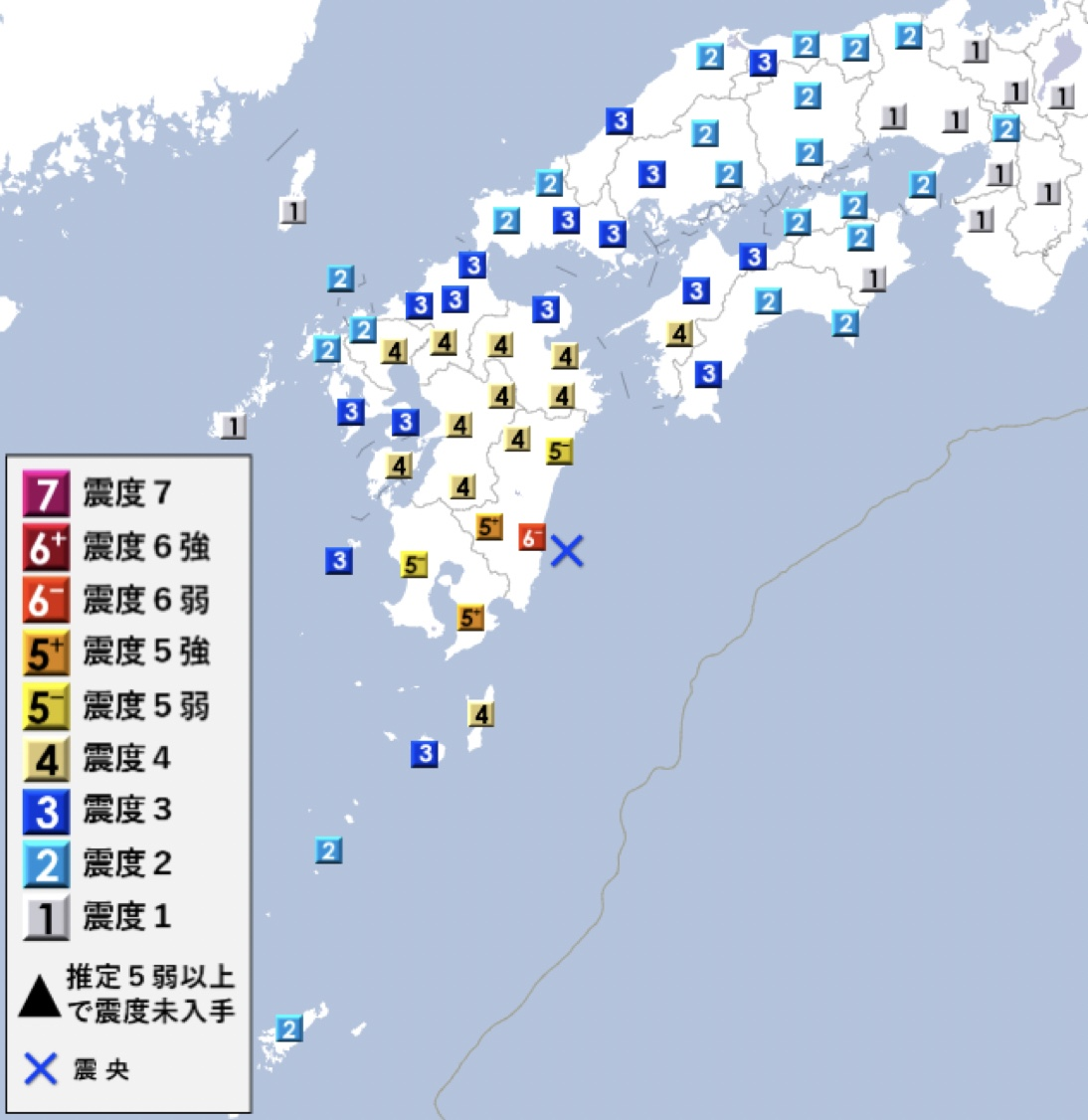
- Map of JMA seismic intensities
- USGS ShakeMap
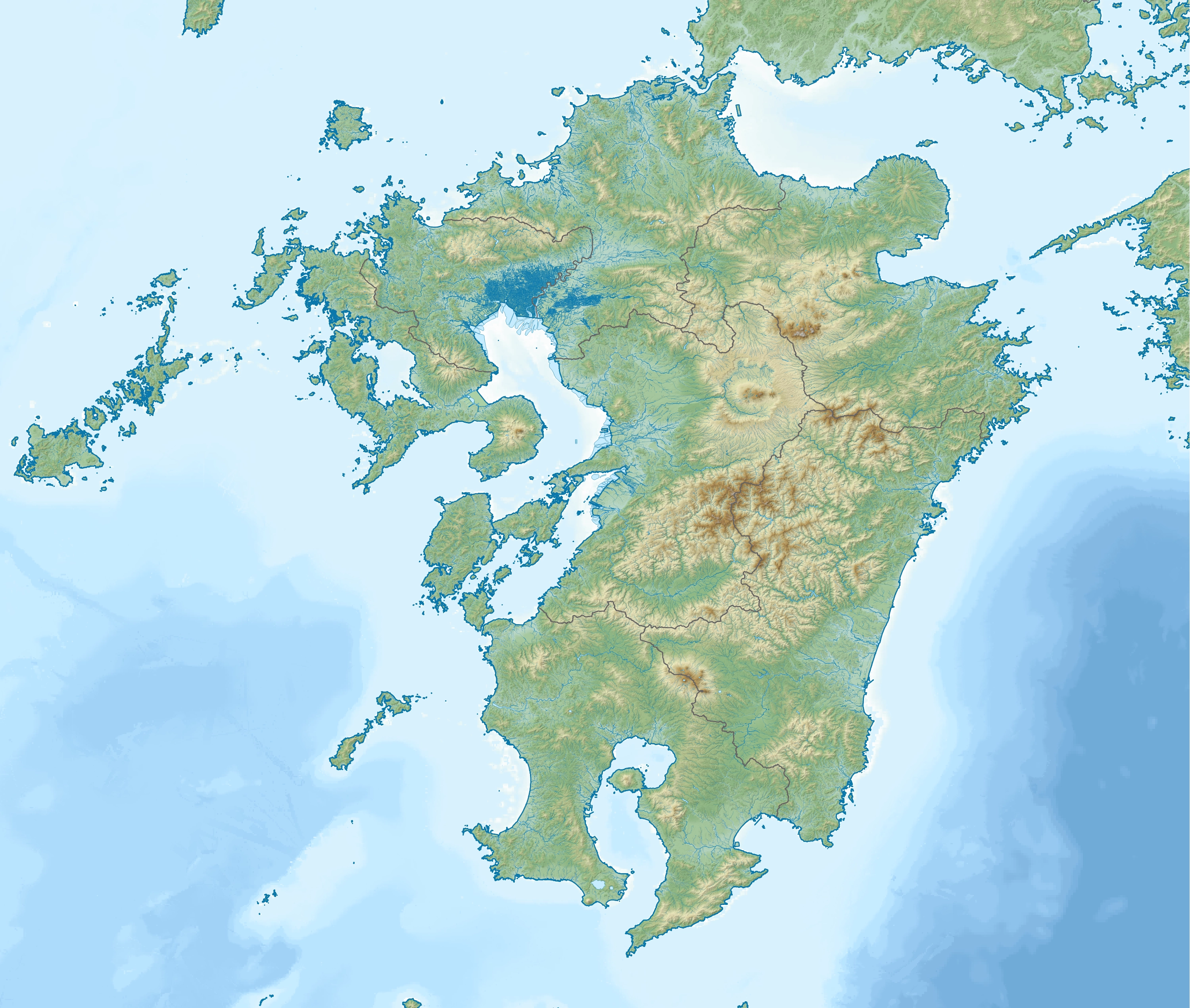
- Location within Kyushu
- UTC time: 2024-08-08 07:42:55
- ISC event: 641941117
- USGS-ANSS: ComCat
- Local date: 8 August 2024
- Local time: 16:42:55 JST
- Duration: ~20 seconds
- Magnitude: 7.1 M_{JMA} 7.1 M_{w}
- Depth: 25 km (16 mi) (USGS) 31 km (19 mi) (JMA)
- Epicenter: 31.719°N 131.527°E
- Type: Reverse
- Areas affected: Kyushu, Japan
- Max. intensity: JMA 6− (MMI VIII)
- Tsunami: 50 cm (1.6 ft)
- Landslides: Yes
- Aftershocks: 24+ recorded Strongest: 5.5 M_{w}
- Casualties: 16 injured

On 8 August 2024, at 16:42:55 JST (07:42 UTC), a M_{w} 7.1 earthquake struck in the Hyūga Sea off the coast of Miyazaki Prefecture, Kyushu, Japan, 20 km (12 mi) northeast of Nichinan. The earthquake resulted in injuries to 16 people, and triggered extended emergency measures in Japan due to fears of a more powerful earthquake along the Nankai Trough.

== Tectonic setting ==
The Hyūga Sea is located at the southwestern end of the Nankai Trough, an active subduction zone. The Nankai Trough represents the plate boundary where the Philippine Sea plate subducts beneath the Eurasian plate. The area is associated with large earthquakes in 1662 (M_{w} 7.9), 1941 (M_{w} 8.0), 1961 (M_{w} 7.5), 1968 (M_{w} 7.5) and two in 1996 (M_{w} 6.6 and 6.7). The Hyūga Sea is interpreted as a transition zone between the highly coupled Nankai Trough in the northeast and weakly coupled Ryukyu Trench further southwest. The 1968 and 1996 earthquakes were subduction sone events occurring on the plate boundary. The 2016 Kumamoto earthquakes were about 140 km (87 mi) northwest of the 2024 Hyūga-nada earthquake and were caused by a similar subduction zone. About 2 km (1.2 mi) beneath the seafloor, low-frequency earthquakes, occur near the shallow subduction interface. Beneath the east coast of Kyushu, on the deeper part of the subduction zone, slow slip events were detected between 1996 and 2017.

== Earthquake ==
The United States Geological Survey reported a magnitude (M_{ww}) of 7.1, at a depth of 25 km (16 mi) and a maximum Modified Mercalli intensity of VIII (Severe). At least 24 aftershocks were recorded following the event, with the strongest measuring M_{w} 5.5.

The USGS initially reported two events, measuring magnitudes 7.1 and 6.9 respectively. This was later fixed.

Locations with a seismic intensity of Shindo 5− and higher
Intensity	Prefecture	Locations
6−	Miyazaki	Nichinan
5+	Miyazaki	Miyazaki, Kushima, Miyakonojō
5+	Kagoshima	Ōsaki
5−	Miyazaki	Mimata, Kunitomi, Shintomi, Takanabe, Takaharu, Kobayashi
5−	Kagoshima	Soo, Kanoya, Kimotsuki, Higashikushira, Tarumizu, Kirishima, Kagoshima, Aira

On August 9, 2024, at 7:57pm JST, a 5.3M_{JMA} earthquake struck 820 km (510 mi) away in western Kanagawa Prefecture, causing tremors recorded as a 5- on the JMA seismic intensity scale and injuring 3. Many in the public believed this earthquake could be related, but Professor Sakai Shinichi of the University of Tokyo's Earthquake Research Institute stated that the Kanagawa earthquake was not related to the Hyūga-nada earthquake or a possible Nankai megathrust earthquake.

On January 13, 2025, at 9:19pm JST, a 6.9M_{JMA} earthquake struck less than 10 km (6.2 mi) away from the August 8, 2024 earthquake at a depth of 30 km (19 mi), causing tremors recorded as a 5- on the JMA seismic intensity scale and an observed 20cm tsunami in Miyazaki Prefecture. One minor injury was reported, along with a landslide and ruptured underground pipes within the Kyushu area. A tsunami advisory was issued immediately following the quake and was lifted at 11:50pm. The January 13 earthquake led the Japanese Meteorological Agency to investigate the event and issue a Nankai Trough Extra Information notice that "[the quake] is not considered to have raised the risk of a Nankai Trough quake"

== Tsunami ==
A tsunami advisory was issued after the earthquake. It covered Kōchi, Ehime, Oita, Miyazaki and Kagoshima Prefectures and predicted waves of up to 1 m (3.3 ft). Subsequently, tsunami waves of 50 cm (1.6 ft) were observed in Miyazaki, 30 cm (0.98 ft) in Kōchi, and 20 cm (0.66 ft) in Kagoshima. The advisories were lifted at 22:00 JST.

== Impact ==
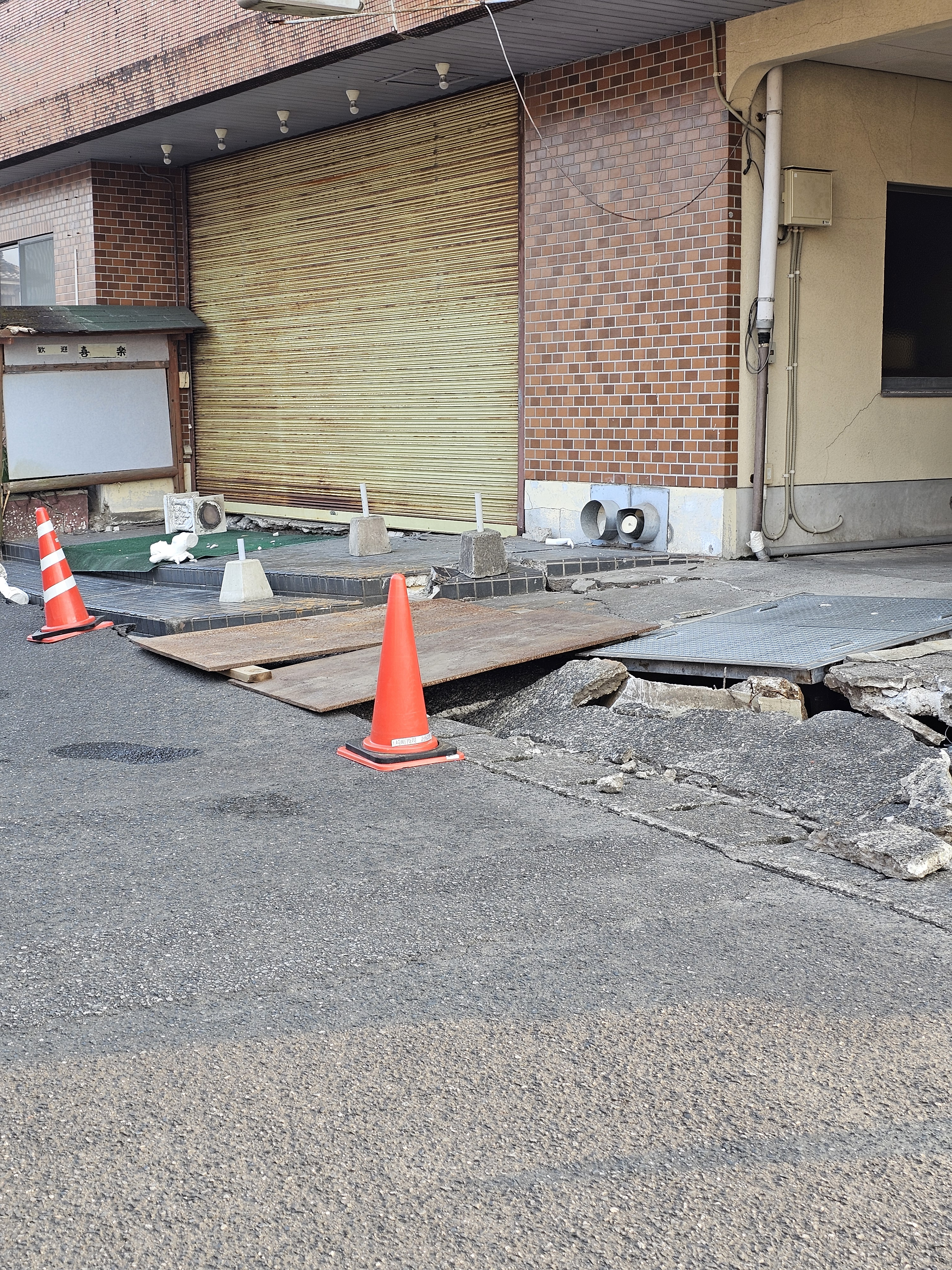
Ground uplift in Kagoshima Prefecture after the earthquake

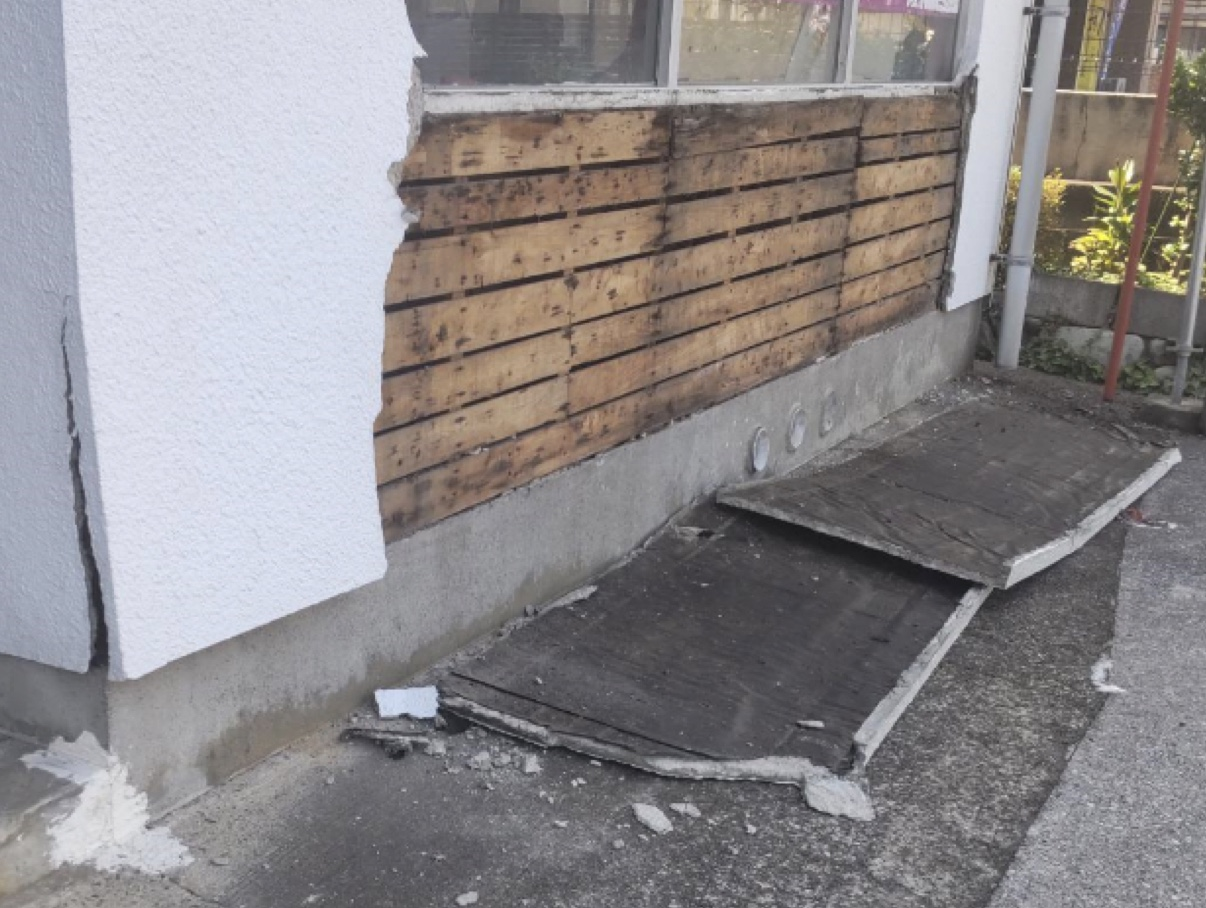
Damage in a house caused by the earthquake.

The earthquake injured at least 16 people, three of them in a serious condition, collapsed or severely damaged three houses and damaged 77 others across Kyushu. Ten people were injured in Miyazaki Prefecture. In Nichinan, the Obi Castle Town sustained damage. A section of National Route 220 was closed due to rockfalls. A house partially collapsed in Miyazaki, and ten buildings as well as the Miyazaki Airport received minor damage. Two flights each of All Nippon Airways and Solaseed Air were canceled, and some flights of Japan Airlines from the airport were delayed. Water pipe leaks occurred in Kushima. In Kagoshima Prefecture, four people were injured, several walls and a two-story house collapsed, and roads were raised in Ōsaki. A landslide was reported in Shibushi. Two people were injured in Kumamoto Prefecture.

Shinkansen services along the Kyushu and Nishi Kyushu lines were suspended, along with a ferry service from Kobe to Miyazaki. No abnormalities were detected at the Ikata and Sendai nuclear power plants located near the epicenter.

== Aftermath ==
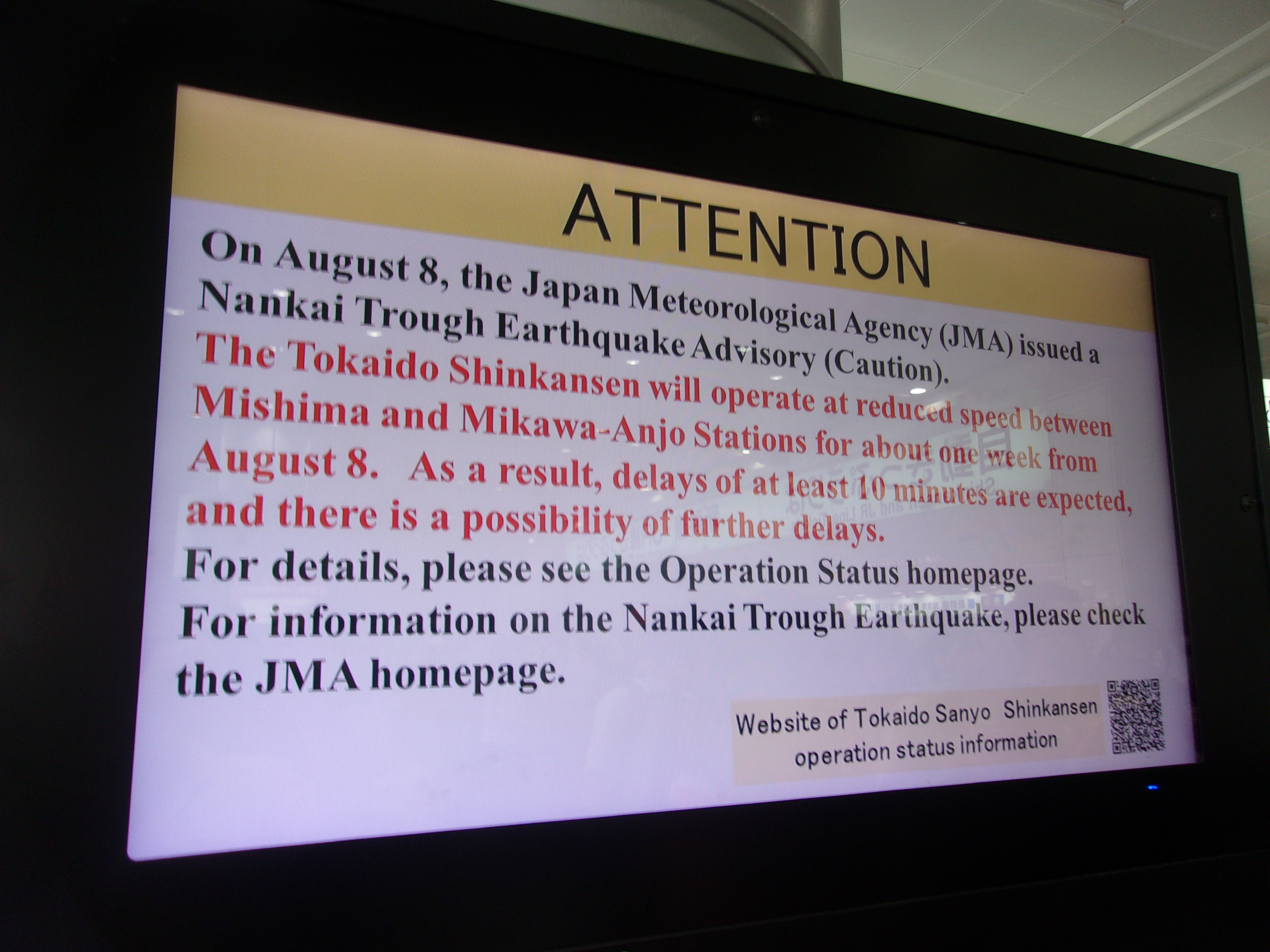
Information on delays due to reduced speed from earthquake warning for the Tōkaidō Shinkansen

Following the earthquake, the Japan Meteorological Agency (JMA) issued a 'Nankai Trough Earthquake Extra Information' advisory that the probability of a megathrust earthquake along the Nankai Trough increased from a 0.1% per week to 1% chance in what was the first advisory of its kind but clarified that it was not imminent. While the JMA stated that no abnormal changes were observed by strain meters, they still maintained the advisory through at least August 14. The JMA called for those living in areas expected to be impacted by a Nankai megathrust earthquake to follow disaster prevention measures provided by the government, and advised households with children, elderly, or physically disabled individuals to consider voluntarily evacuating. The Japanese government designated 707 municipalities in 29 prefectures, including Yokohama, Shizuoka, Hamamatsu, Nagoya, Kyoto, Osaka, Kobe, Okayama, Hiroshima, all of Shikoku, Miyazaki, and parts of Okinawa, as areas at risk of being affected by a strong tremor with an intensity of lower 6 or higher and a tsunami with a height of more than three meters. The warning was eventually lifted on 15 August after the JMA said it had not detected major seismic activity.

In response, the Central Japan Railway Company ordered trains at the Tokaido Shinkansen line to run at a slower pace for a week, while Prime Minister Fumio Kishida cancelled a scheduled trip to Central Asia on 9 August as part of government preparations for its possible occurrence. Supermarkets issued a limit of 12 two-liter plastic bottles of water to be sold per family to discourage panic buying, while demand for drinking water, emergency toilets and preserved foods significantly increased in online shopping websites.

Several hotel booking cancellations were reported across Japan due to the advisory, with at least 150 cancellations recorded in Miyazaki, 200 at the Dōgo Onsen in Matsuyama, and over 9,400 participants cancelling their participation in the Yosakoi Matsuri in Kōchi. Many of these cancellations coincided with the Obon holiday week.

== See also ==
- 1662 Hyūga-nada earthquake
- 1941 Hyūga-nada earthquake
- 1968 Hyūga-nada earthquake
- Nankai megathrust earthquakes
- List of earthquakes in 2024
- List of earthquakes in Japan
