= Penglai Waterfall =

Waterfall in Gukeng, Yunlin, Taiwan

Penglai Waterfall 蓬萊瀑布
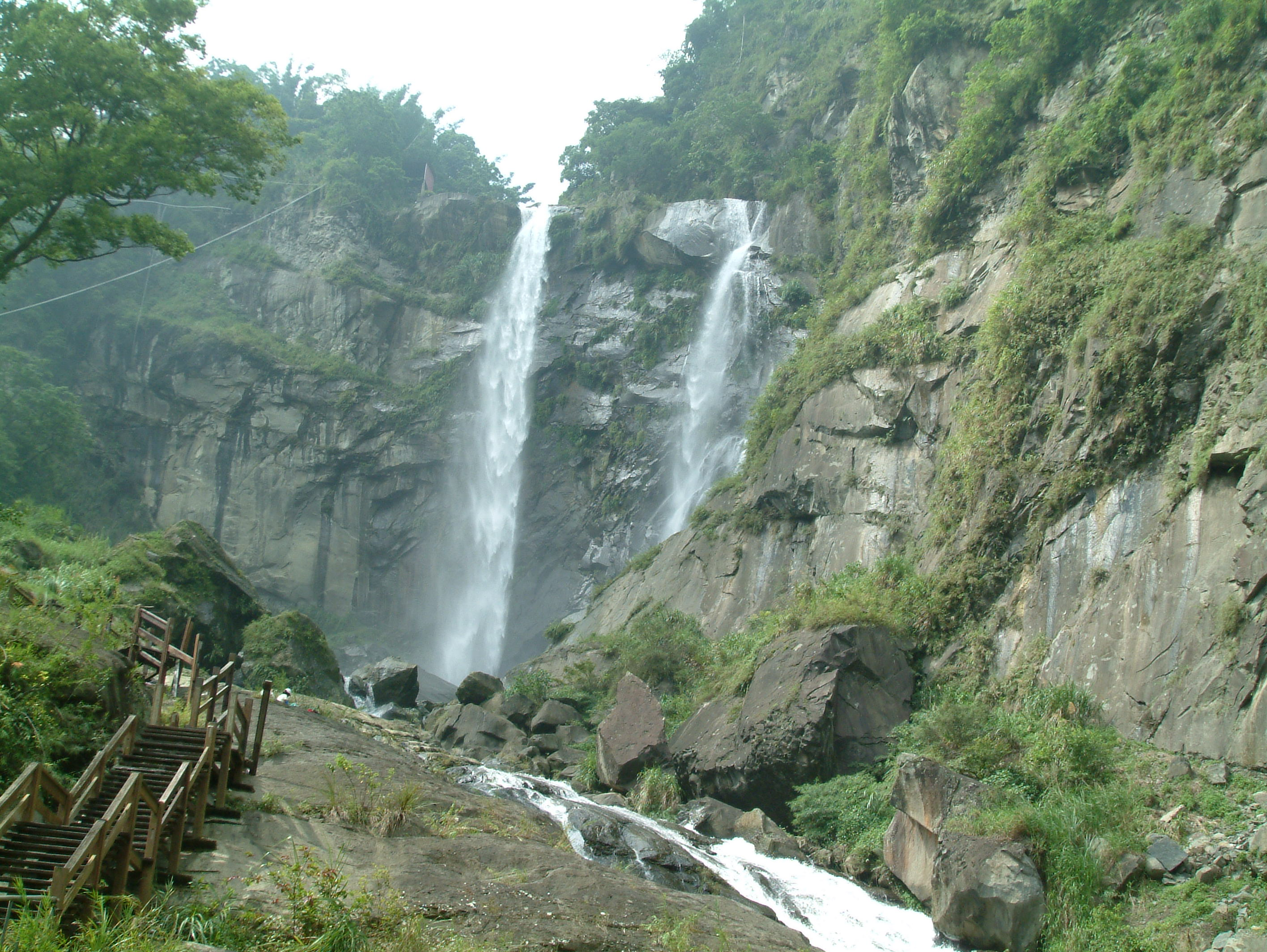
- Interactive map of Penglai Waterfall 蓬萊瀑布
- Location: Gukeng, Yunlin County, Taiwan
- Coordinates: 23°35′46.8″N 120°42′30.9″E
- Type: waterfall
- Elevation: 1,200 m (3,900 ft)
- Total height: 200 m (660 ft)
- Watercourse: Jhugao River

The Penglai Waterfall (traditional Chinese: 蓬萊瀑布; simplified Chinese: 蓬莱瀑布; pinyin: Pénglái Pùbù) is a waterfall in Gukeng Township, Yunlin County, Taiwan.

== Geology ==
The waterfall is located in Shibi Valley. It is part of Jhugao River at Jhugao River basin. Located at an elevation of 1,200 meters above sea level, it spans over a height of 200 meters.

== Facilities ==
The waterfall used to feature a cable car system but was destroyed during the 921 earthquake in 1999.

== See also ==
- List of waterfalls
