= 1941 Chungpu earthquake =

Earthquake in Taiwan

- Location within Taiwan
- UTC time: 1941-12-16 19:19:43
- ISC event: 901124
- USGS-ANSS: ComCat
- Local date: December 17, 1941
- Local time: 03:19
- Magnitude: 7.2 M_{w}
- Depth: 15 kilometres (9 mi)
- Epicenter: 23.29°N 120.41°E
- Areas affected: Japanese Taiwan
- Casualties: 358 dead 733 injured

The 1941 Chungpu earthquake (Chinese: 1941年中埔地震; pinyin: 1941 nián Zhōngpǔ Dìzhèn) occurred with a magnitude of 7.2 on December 17, and was centred on the town of Chūho Village, Kagi District, Tainan Prefecture of Taiwan under Japanese rule. It was the fourth-deadliest earthquake of the 20th century in Taiwan, claiming 358 lives.

== Earthquake ==
The earthquake struck at 03:19 local time on 17 December 1941. At a magnitude of 7.2 and with a focal depth of 15 kilometres (9 mi), the quake was felt throughout the island. The epicentre was in Tainan Prefecture in modern-day Zhongpu, Chiayi, just southeast of Chiayi City, and was close to the location of the 1906 Meishan earthquake, which hit in the neighbouring township of Meishan.

== Damage ==
According to Taiwan's Central Weather Bureau, there were 358 people killed as a result of the quake, with a further 733 people injured. 4,520 dwellings were completely destroyed, and 11,086 were partially destroyed. The quake also triggered a landslide on Caoling Mountain (Chinese: 草嶺山; pinyin: Cǎolǐng Shān) which dammed the river and created the temporary Caoling Lake in the valley below. This lake has formed and drained several times over the last two hundred years in response to earthquakes and typhoons. Damage was sustained to infrastructure, with gas, electricity and transportation networks being seriously disrupted.

== Reaction ==
Taiwan was a Japanese colony at the time of the earthquake. Coming as it did just ten days after the Japanese attack on Pearl Harbor, false rumours abounded that the earthquake was caused by retaliatory United States bombing.

== See also ==
- List of earthquakes in 1941
- List of earthquakes in Taiwan
