= 1941 Andaman Islands earthquake =

Earthquake in Southeast Asia

- Location within India
- UTC time: 1941-06-26 11:52:03
- ISC event: 900863
- USGS-ANSS: ComCat
- Local date: June 26, 1941
- Local time: 17:22:03 IST
- Magnitude: 7.7–8.1 M_{w}
- Epicenter: 12.50°N 92.57°E
- Areas affected: India, Andaman and Nicobar Islands, Sri Lanka
- Max. intensity: EMS-98 VII (Damaging)
- Tsunami: Yes
- Casualties: Few

The 1941 Andaman Islands earthquake struck the Andaman Islands on June 26 with a magnitude of 7.7 to 8.1. Details of this event are poorly known as much of Southeast Asia was in the turmoil of World War II. The quake caused severe damage in the Andaman Islands. The tsunami it triggered was reported along the Andaman and Nicobar Islands, India and British Ceylon (now known as Sri Lanka). There may have been damage and deaths in Bangladesh, Myanmar, and Thailand due to the tsunami.

== Effects ==
The earthquake partially collapsed Cellular Jail and destroyed other masonry buildings at Port Blair. Ground slumping, soil liquefaction and sand volcanoes were reported. Roads, bridges, embankments, seawalls and jetties were seriously damaged. Large fissures occurred in the ground. Large trees were tilted and uprooted. According to eyewitness accounts, these trees fell in a westerly direction. There was an unspecified number of deaths only described as "few". Shaking was felt over a very wide area; felt reports also came from Colombo, Chennai, Kolkata and Mumbai. Islands located in a passage between Little Andaman and South Andaman Islands subsided by over 1.5 m (4 ft 11 in).

== Tsunami ==
Although no tide gauges existed, the estimated tsunami heights were 0.75 m (2 ft 6 in) to 1.25 m (4 ft 1 in) along the east coast of India. It is claimed that 5,000 drowned in India but no reliable attribution for such figure exists. News reports misattributed these deaths with a storm surge, while The Times of India did not mention a tsunami while reporting the event. No news or scientific reports made mention of a large death toll from the tsunami. It was also unlikely that a 1 m (3 ft 3 in) tsunami could result in a high death toll. Reports of the tsunami effects along the Andaman Islands also did not mention any fatalities.

== Geology ==
The earthquake occurred in a convergent boundary zone that separates the Indian plate from the Burma plate. The Indian plate subducts obliquely beneath the Burma plate at a rate of 6.7 cm/year. It was previously assigned a magnitude of 8.1 to 8.7. The International Seismological Centre assigned this event as having a moment magnitude of 8.0. Further research suggest the earthquake did not occur as a result of rupturing the subduction zone, rather, it was a normal-faulting intraslab earthquake located within the Indian plate beneath the islands.

== See also ==
- List of earthquakes in 1941
- List of earthquakes in India
