= 1941 Colima earthquake =

Earthquake in Mexico

- Location within Mexico
- UTC time: 1941-04-15 19:09:56
- ISC event: 900764
- USGS-ANSS: ComCat
- Local date: April 15, 1941
- Local time: 13:09
- Magnitude: 7.7 M_{s}
- Depth: 35 km (22 mi)
- Epicenter: 18.85°N 102.94°W
- Areas affected: Mexico
- Max. intensity: MMI X (Extreme)
- Casualties: 90 killed

The 1941 Colima earthquake occurred on April 15 at 19:09 UTC (13:09 local time). The epicenter was located in the State of Michoacán, Mexico.

The magnitude of this earthquake was put at M_{s} 7.7 or M_{w} 7.7. The intensities were X (Extreme) in Colima, VIII (Severe) in Manzanillo, and V (Moderate) in Mexico City. Ninety people were reported dead. The cathedral of Colima was destroyed. Many houses and public buildings in Colima, including the Federal Palace (Palacio federal) and the Hidalgo Theater (Teatro Hidalgo), were damaged. Of the 8,000 houses in the city of Colima, 900 or 2000 collapsed, according to different sources.

This earthquake was an interplate earthquake between the Cocos plate and the North American plate. It occurred in the Colima region of the Middle America Trench. This earthquake was very close to where the 1973 Colima earthquake occurred. From the locally recorded time intervals between the arrival of the S wave and the P wave (S−P times) and from the felt intensities, it is suggested that the rupture zone of this earthquake was larger than the 1973 earthquake and may have extended into the rupture zone of the 1985 Michoacán earthquake.

== See also ==
- List of earthquakes in 1941
- List of earthquakes in Mexico
