= List of earthquakes in Yemen =

== Earthquakes ==
Date	Region	Mag.	MMI	Deaths	Injuries	Total damage / notes
2016-05-24	Al Bayda' Governorate	4.9 mb	V	4		Seven houses destroyed
1991-11-22	Ibb Governorate	4.7 mb		11	40	Moderate damage
1982-12-13	Dhamar Governorate	6.0 M_{s}	VIII	2,800	1,500	$2 billion
1941-01-11	Razih District	5.9 M_{s}	VIII	1200	200	Extreme damage
1463	Zabid District		IX	10		50 homes damaged and 50 homes destroyed
1426	Zabid District		XI	60		Severe damage
1387-09-05	Aden Governorate			Many		Severe damage
1377	Aden Governorate					Moderate damage
1358	Zabid District		VIII	61		Moderate damage
1072	Yemen, Saudi Arabia		VIII	50		Moderate damage
Note: The inclusion criteria for adding events are based on WikiProject Earthquakes' notability guideline that was developed for stand-alone articles. The principles described also apply to lists. In summary, only damaging, injurious, or deadly events should be recorded.

== See also ==
- Geology of Yemen
