= 1982 North Yemen earthquake =

Seismic event in the southern Arabian Peninsula

- Location within Yemen
- UTC time: 1982-12-13 09:12:51
- ISC event: 586778
- USGS-ANSS: ComCat
- Local date: December 13, 1982
- Local time: 12:12:51 SAST
- Magnitude: 6.2 M_{w}
- Depth: 10 km (6.2 mi)
- Epicenter: 14.64°N 44.3°E
- Type: Dip-slip (normal)
- Areas affected: Yemen
- Max. intensity: MMI VIII (Severe)
- Casualties: 2,800 dead 1,500 injured

The 1982 North Yemen earthquake hit near the city of Dhamar, North Yemen (now part of Yemen) on December 13. Measuring 6.2 on the moment magnitude scale, with a maximum perceived intensity of VIII (Severe) on the Mercalli intensity scale, as many as 2,800 people were killed and another 1,500 injured. The shock occurred within several hundred kilometers of a plate boundary in a geologically complex region that includes active volcanoes and seafloor spreading ridges. Yemen has a history of destructive earthquakes, though this was the first instrumentally recorded event to be detected on global seismograph networks.

== Tectonic setting ==
The southwestern portion of the Arabian plate lies adjacent to the Afar triple junction (an area of spreading ridges) near the Red Sea. The triple junction marks the intersecting point of the Arabian, African, and Somali plates. Spreading initiated around 5 mya and persists at 6–7.5 mm per year in the southern Red Sea and ~10 mm per year in the eastern Gulf of Aden. Earthquake activity is normally focused at the undersea ridges, but infrequent small to moderate events occur on land in the interior of the Arabian plate within 200–300 km (120–190 mi) of the centerline of the Red Sea in Yemen, as well as farther to the northwest in the 'Asir Region of Saudi Arabia.

There were 30 specific years where individual or multiple earthquakes were documented in Yemen for the 1,240 years prior to 1982. During the 20 century, in 1909, a shock resulted in the deaths of 300 people and damaged 400 homes; in 1941, two shocks, M_{s} 5.8 and 6.2, killed 1,200 and destroyed 1,400 homes. Other, minor, events occurred in 1955 and again in 1959.

== Earthquake ==
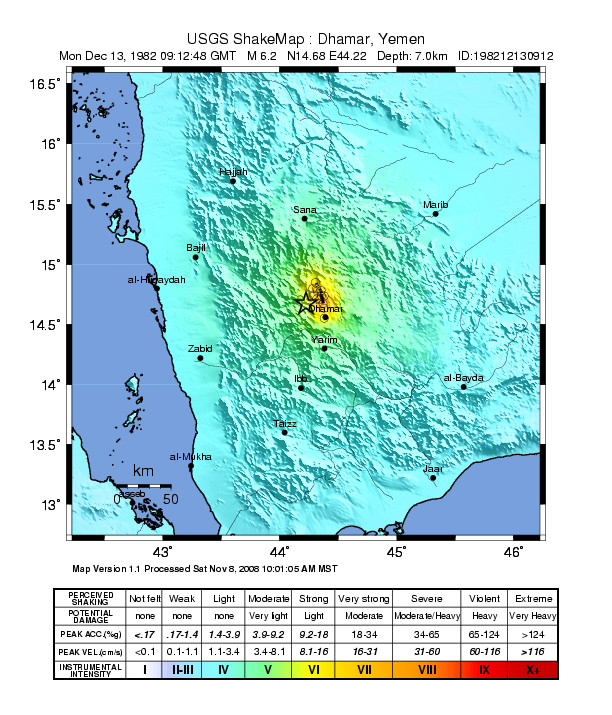
USGS ShakeMap for the event

The event was a first in several classifications. It was the first instrumentally located earthquake in the southern Arabian Peninsula since 1959 and the first shock that resulted in fatalities since 1941. The earthquake was also the first in the area to be detected teleseismically on the Worldwide Standard Seismograph Network and the Global Digital Seismograph Network.

Because the shock occurred 200 kilometers (120 mi) from the Red Sea Rift, it was described by Langer et al. as a "plate marginal", rather than an intraplate event. Analysis of the source parameters revealed that the main shock was a complex normal faulting event, and consisted of two equal sized shocks, separated by about 12 seconds. It was compared to the 1983 Coalinga and 1984 Morgan Hill earthquakes, both of which were events in California which had similar dual shock characteristics.

=== Intensity ===
An east-west trending zone 45 km (28 mi) long and 35 km (22 mi) across was assigned VIII (Severe) on the Mercalli intensity scale. This zone covered a 1,400 km^{2} (540 sq mi) area. There, masonry stone and mud brick dwellings partially or totally collapsed, accounting for the majority of deaths. Single floor concrete masonry buildings were cracked but structurally resilient. Damage was greater to buildings situated on bedrock rather than young sedimentary layers. While there were no major landslides, individual rocks as large as 0.6 m (2 ft 0 in) across toppled in areas with steep terrain. Intensity VII (Very strong) enveloped the meizoseismal area, extending 75 km (47 mi) and 65 km (40 mi) in the east–west and north–south directions, respectively.

=== Damage ===
The shallow mainshock occurred in a highly populated area 70 kilometers (43 mi) south of Sana'a. The primary event and its aftershocks created a zone of destruction between Ma'bar and Dhamar, where older villages were heavily damaged, with adobe or rubble masonry homes suffering the most. Homes and villages that were adjacent to steep slopes or cliffs were susceptible to rockfalls and landslides, but damage was much less pronounced away from the epicentral area, and modern city centers with properly engineered structures were only slightly affected.

The National Earthquake Information Center reported that 2,800 people died and that another 1,500 were injured. Other estimates for the total deaths range from 1,600 to 3,000. About 63 mi (101 km) from Sanaa, the village of Dhuran Anis lost at least 335 residents. The state information minister also said 150 schoolchildren died when their school was levelled, and a collapsing mosque killed 40 attendees. In all, nearly 300 villages were severely damaged or destroyed and about 700,000 were made homeless. The earthquake was felt in North Yemen and much of South Yemen as well as into Saudi Arabia.

=== Aftershocks ===
Beginning sixteen days after the mainshock a portable seismograph network consisting of mostly analog units was deployed in the epicentral area. Six days of recording, capturing thousands of aftershocks, were obtained under its final and optimum configuration. Two of the larger events, the December 29 M5.3 event and the January 8 M4.6 event, were also recorded teleseismically during this period.

== Aftermath ==
The initial search and rescue efforts were hampered by communication problems and road conditions. Chaos and looting also ensued in some of the devastated places. Relief teams from Saudi Arabia and Palestinians who fled Lebanon following the Israeli invasion also assisted local rescuers.

Several Arab states immediately attended to the disaster by deploying relief teams and supplies. Saudi's defence minister, Sultan bin Abdulaziz, said 36 aircraft flew to Yemen, carrying aid such as medicine and a field hospital. Other nearby states also provided medical personnel, blood and equipment. Other nations including Kuwait, Qatar, the United Arab Emirates, West Germany, Switzerland, and the Netherlands also offered aid. The Saudi Arabia-backed International Red Cross contributed significantly to the international response.

== See also ==
- List of earthquakes in 1982
- List of earthquakes in Yemen
