= 1941 Van–Erciş earthquake =

Earthquake in. eastern Turkey

- Location within Turkey
- UTC time: 1941-09-10 21:53:55
- ISC event: 900990
- USGS-ANSS: ComCat
- Local date: 10 September 1941
- Local time: 23:53
- Magnitude: 5.9 M_{s}
- Epicenter: 39.5°N 43.3°E
- Areas affected: Turkey
- Max. intensity: MMI VIII (Severe)
- Casualties: 192

The 1941 Van–Erciş earthquake occurred at 23:53 local time on 10 September. It had an estimated surface-wave magnitude of 5.9 and a maximum intensity of VIII (Severe) on the Mercalli intensity scale. The earthquake caused estimated casualties of between 190 and 430 people and also 600 buildings have collapsed.

== See also ==
- List of earthquakes in Turkey
- List of earthquakes in 1941
