= Caoling =

Rural village Gukeng, Yunlin, Taiwan

- Rural village

Other transcription(s)
  - Chinese: 草嶺
  - Pinyin: Cǎolǐng
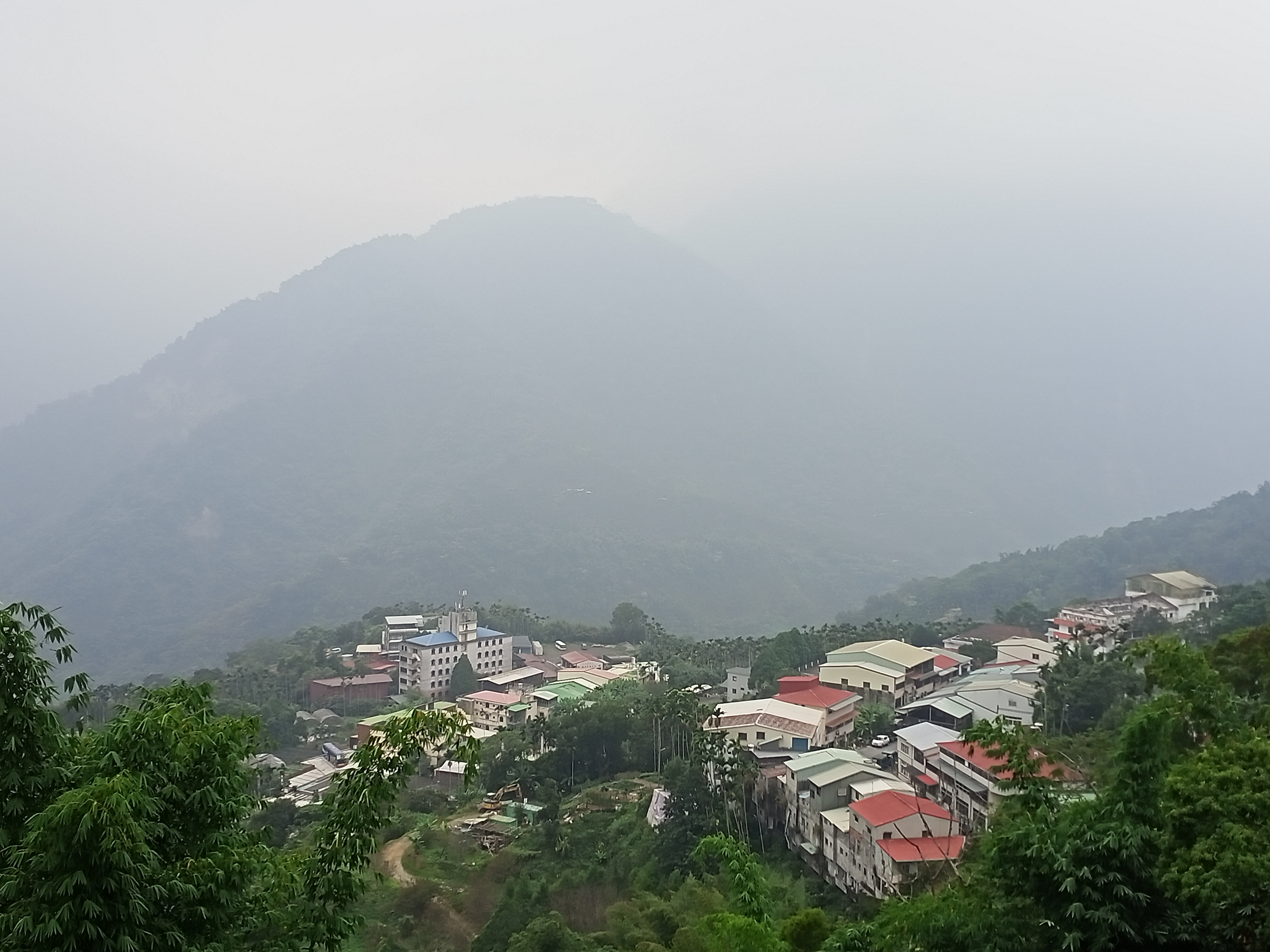
- Overlooking Caoling from Caoling Elementary School, in 2020

- Location within Taiwan
- Coordinates: 23°35′29.5″N 120°41′05.8″E
- Country: Taiwan
- County: Yunlin
- Township: Gukeng
- Elevation: 450–1,750 m (1,480–5,740 ft)
- Time zone: UTC+8 (TST)

Caoling (Chinese: 草嶺; pinyin: Cǎolǐng) is a rural village in Gukeng Township, Yunlin County, Taiwan. It is 450 metres (1,476 ft) to 1,750 metres (5,741 ft) above sea level. The area measures approximately one thousand hectares.

Mountains around Caoling are prone to landslides, and four barrier lakes have formed around the area. The most recent one, New Caoling Lake, existed between 1999 and 2004.

== Transportation ==
Caoling is located on County Route 149 and accessible by bus from Douliu Station of Taiwan Railway.
