= 1941 Hyūga-nada earthquake =

Earthquake in Japan

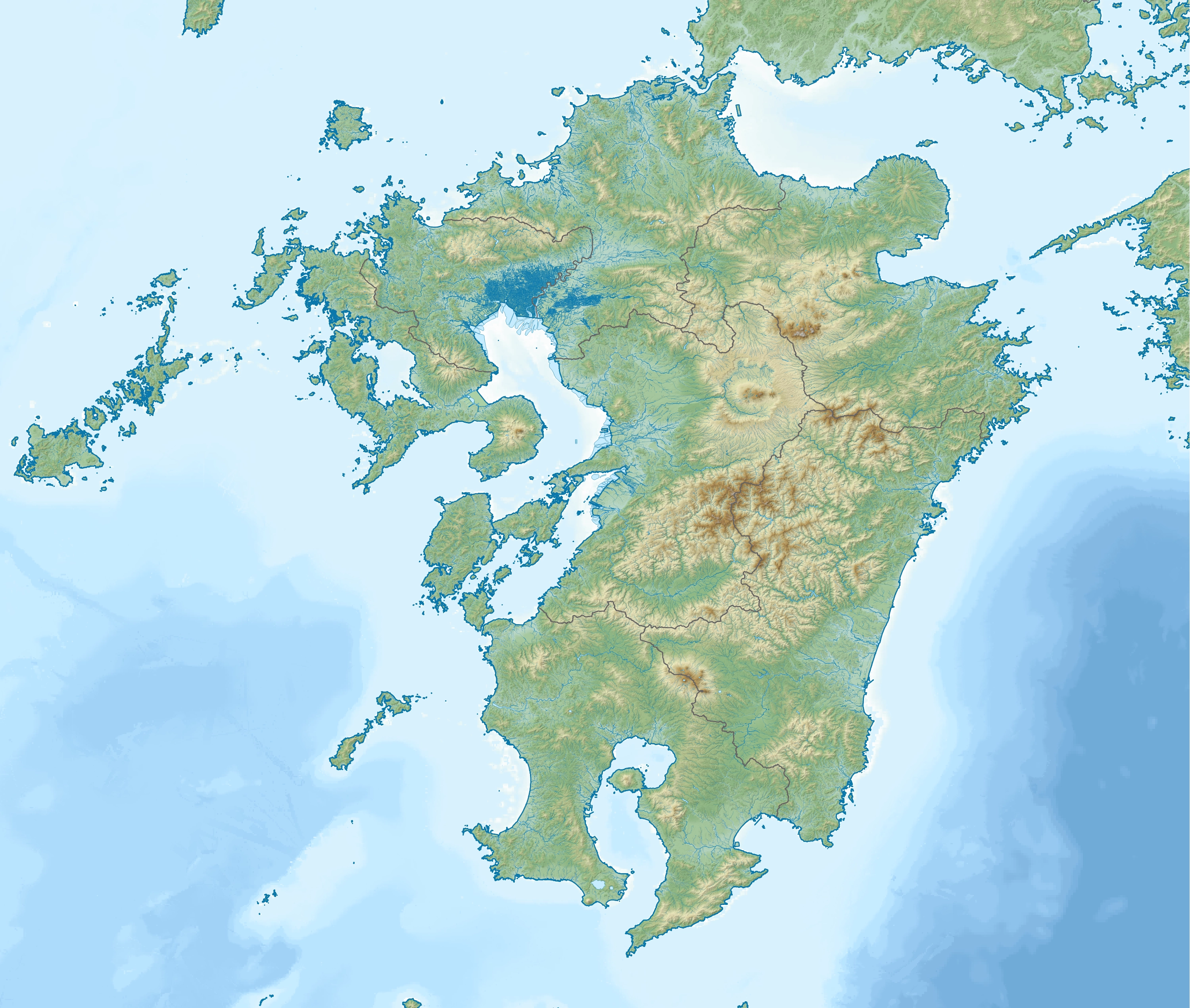
- Location within Kyushu
- UTC time: 1941-11-19 10:02:32
- ISC event: 901083
- USGS-ANSS: ComCat
- Local date: November 19, 1941
- Local time: 16:46:32
- Magnitude: 8.0 M_{w}
- Depth: 35 km (22 mi)
- Epicenter: 32.129°N 131.944°E
- Areas affected: Japan
- Max. intensity: JMA 5
- Casualties: 2 dead

The 1941 Hyūga-nada earthquake occurred off the coast of Kyushu, Japan at 19:02 local time on November 19. The earthquake measured 8.0 M_{w} and had a depth of 35 km (22 mi). A JMA seismic intensity of 5 was observed in Miyazaki City and Nobeoka City in Miyazaki Prefecture, and Hitoyoshi City in Kumamoto Prefecture. Due to the earthquake, a tsunami with a maximum wave height of 1.2 m (3 ft 11 in) was observed in Kyushu and Shikoku. The tsunami washed away many ships. Twenty-seven homes were destroyed and two people were killed. In Miyazaki, Ōita and Kagoshima prefectures, telephone services were disrupted. Subsidence by 8 cm (3.1 in) was recorded at Hyūga, Miyazaki. At Nobeoka, stone walls and embankments were damaged while roads cracked. It was felt as far as central Honshu.

== See also ==
- 1662 Hyūga-nada earthquake
- 1968 Hyūga-nada earthquake
- 2024 Hyūga-nada earthquake
- List of earthquakes in 1941
- List of earthquakes in Japan
