= 1982 Ometepec earthquake =

Earthquake in Mexico

- Location within Mexico
- UTC time: Doublet earthquake:
- A: 1982-06-07 06:52:34
- B: 1982-06-07 10:59:38
- ISC event
- A: 596705
- B: 596720
- USGS-ANSS
- A: ComCat
- B: ComCat
- Local date: 7 June 1982
- Magnitude
- A: 5.8 mb; 6.9 M_{s}
- B: 6.0 mb; 7.0 M_{s}
- Depth: A: 19.4 km B: 19.9 km; 33.8 km
- Epicenter: 16.51°N 98.25°W
- Areas affected: Mexico
- Max. intensity: A: MMI VII (Very strong) B: MMI VIII (Severe)
- Casualties: 9 dead

The 1982 Ometepec earthquake that struck Mexico's southwestern coast near Ometepec (Guerrero) on 7 June was a doublet earthquake that ruptured in two steps. The first happened at 06:52 UTC, the second five hours later at 10:59 UTC. Estimated magnitudes are 6.9 and 7.0 on the M_{s} scale, and 5.8 and 6.0 on the mb scale. The maximum Mercalli intensities were VII and VIII, respectively.

Mexico's southwestern coast is parallel to the 3,000 km (1,900 mi) Middle America Trench (MAT), where the oceanic Cocos Plate (a remnant of the ancient Farallon Plate) is being subducted under the North American Plate, resulting in many major earthquakes. Most earthquakes observed in this region are similar to earthquakes seen at other subduction zones, but in the vicinity of Ometepec, they tend to occur as doublets. This earthquake is unique in being (circa 2013) the "best documented doublet and for which near and teleseismic data are available", and has been extensively studied.

The interruption of the main rupture that results in a doublet earthquake has been attributed to "asperities", patches in the fault where harder rock resists immediate rupture. However, the study of this earthquake's aftershocks shows a discontinuity in their spatial distribution. This has been interpreted as indicating a split in the subducting plate, where the plate is subducting at slightly different down angles on either side of the split.

== Sources ==
- ANSS, "Mexico 1982a: M 6.9 – Oaxaca, Mexico", Comprehensive Catalog, U.S. Geological Survey
- ANSS, "Mexico 1982b: M 7.0 – Guerrero, Mexico", Comprehensive Catalog, U.S. Geological Survey
- International Seismological Centre, ISC-EHB Bulletin, Thatcham, United Kingdom
- Astiz, Luciana; Kanamori, Hiroo (1984), "An earthquake doublet in Ometepec, Guerrero, Mexico." (PDF), Physics of the Earth and Planetary Interiors, 34 (1–2): 24–45, Bibcode:1984PEPI...34...24A, doi:10.1016/0031-9201(84)90082-7.
- Yamamoto, Jaime; Quintanar, Luis; Jiménez, Zenón (2002), "Why earthquake doublets in the Ometepec, Guerrero, Mexico subduction area?", Physics of the Earth and Planetary Interiors, 132 (1–3): 131–139, Bibcode:2002PEPI..132..131Y, doi:10.1016/S0031-9201(02)00048-1.
- Yamamoto, Jaime; González-Moran, Tomas; Quintanar, Luis; Zavaleta, Ana B.; Zamora, Araceli; Espindola, Victor H. (January 2013), "Seismic patterns of the Guerrero–Oaxaca, Mexico region, and its relationship to the continental margin structure", Geophysical Journal International, 192 (1): 375–389, Bibcode:2013GeoJI.192..375Y, doi:10.1093/gji/ggs025.

== See also ==
- The International Seismological Centre has a bibliography and/or authoritative data for this event.
