= Azores–Gibraltar transform fault =

Geological feature in the Atlantic Ocean

Coordinates: 37°N 16°W

The Azores–Gibraltar transform fault stretches between the Strait of Gibraltar and the Azores triple junction

The Azores–Gibraltar transform fault (AGFZ), also called a fault zone and a fracture zone, is a major seismic zone in the eastern Atlantic Ocean between the Azores and the Strait of Gibraltar. It is the product of the complex interaction between the African, Eurasian, and Iberian plates. Since the beginning of seismological records in the 1700s, the AGFZ has produced the following large-magnitude earthquakes and accompanying tsunamis: 1755 Lisbon, 1761 Lisbon, 1816 North Atlantic, 1941 Gloria Fault earthquake, 1969 Horseshoe and 1975.

== Geologic setting ==
Forming the Atlantic segment of the boundary between the African and Eurasian plates, the AGFZ is largely dominated by compressional forces between these converging plates, resulting in subduction of 3.8 to 5.5 mm/yr (0.15 to 0.22 in/yr), but it is subject to a dynamic tectonic regime that also involves extension and transform faulting. The oceanic lithosphere in the area is directly related to the opening of the North Atlantic Ocean and is one of the oldest preserved on Earth.

The western end of the AGFZ, the Azores triple junction on the Mid-Atlantic Ridge (MAR), is where the North American, African, and Eurasian plates meet. Spreading in the MAR is faster south of the AGFZ than north of it, which results in a transcurrent movement along the AGFZ at about 4 mm/a (0.16 in/year). The eastern segment of the fault is complex and characterised by a series of seamounts and ridges separating the Tores and Horseshoe abyssal plains. The active compressional deformation in this segment is an extremely rare example of compression between two oceanic lithospheres.

== Plate tectonics ==
The Atlantic Ocean is surrounded by passive margins with the exception of three subduction zones: the Lesser Antilles Arc in the Caribbean, the Scotia Arc in the South Atlantic, and the Gibraltar Arc in the western Mediterranean. The Gibraltar Arc is propagating westward into the Atlantic over an east-dipping oceanic slab (one of the remainders of the Tethys Ocean). This subduction/back-arc basin system is developing in front of the Alboran Block (under the Alboran Sea) at a rate faster than that of the Africa-Iberia convergence. Consequently, this area is a rare case of a passive margin slowly being transformed into an active margin. The extension of this subduction system, known as the "allochthonous unit of the Gulf of Cadiz" (AUGC), marks the continuing propagation of the Alpide belt into the Atlantic along the AGFZ. In the context of the Wilson Cycle, this suggests that the beginning of the closure of the Atlantic is taking place in front of the three Atlantic subduction zones.

== See also ==
- Fifteen-Twenty fracture zone
