= Zabid district =

Coordinates: 14°10′N 43°15′E

Zabid District مُدِيْرِيَّة زَبِيد
- District
- Interactive map of Zabid District مُدِيْرِيَّة زَبِيد
- Country: Yemen
- Governorate: Al Hudaydah

Population (2003)
  - Total: 155,585
- Time zone: UTC+3 (Yemen Standard Time)

Zabid District (Arabic: مُدِيْرِيَّة زَبِيد) is a district of the Al Hudaydah Governorate in western Yemen.

== Overview ==
The Yemeni Sufi Sheikh Isma'il al-Jabarti of the Qadiriyyah order is buried in the Zabid District. The father of Sheikh Abdirahman bin Isma'il al-Jabarti (Darod), the progenitor of the Somali Darod clan, Isma'il al-Jabarti's tomb is situated in the ancient local town of Bab Siham. His grave is a popular place of pilgrimage.

== Demographics ==
As of 2003, the district had a population of 155,585 inhabitants.
