= Gukeng =

Rural township in Yunlin, Taiwan

Coordinates: 23°39′N 120°34′E

Gukeng Township 古坑鄉
- Rural township
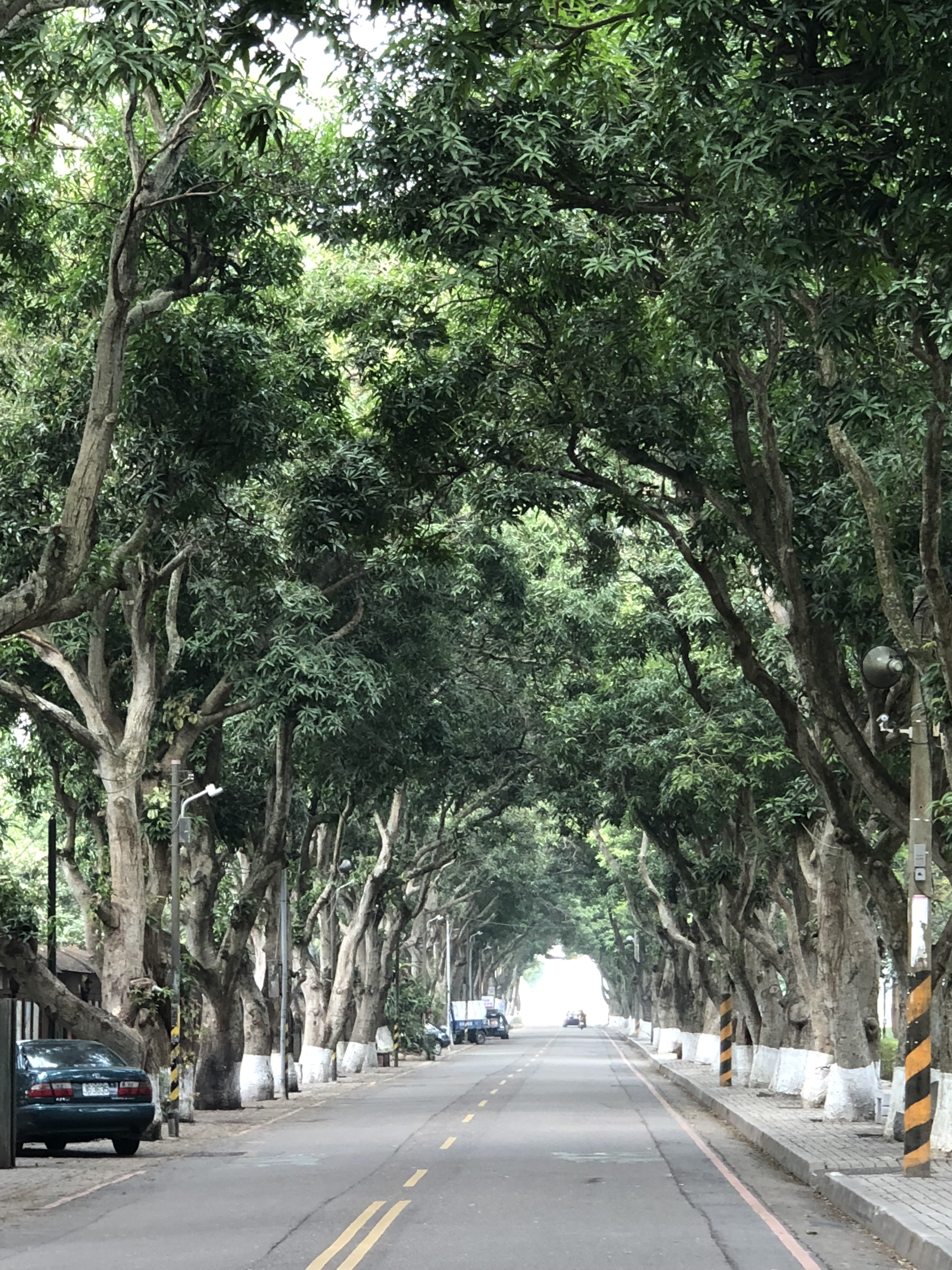
- Country road through tunnel of mango trees in Gukeng

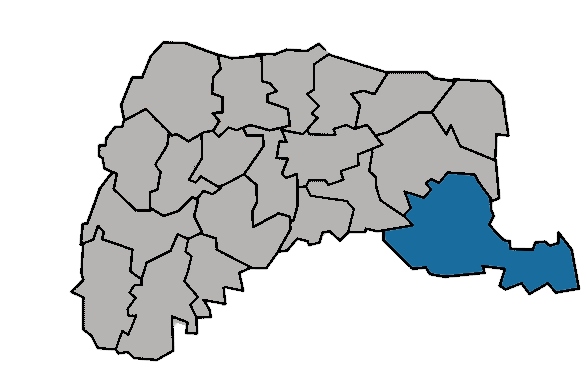
- Gukeng Township in Yunlin County
- Location: Yunlin County, Taiwan

Area
  - Total: 167 km^{2} (64 sq mi)

Population (February 2023)
  - Total: 30,105
  - Density: 180/km^{2} (467/sq mi)

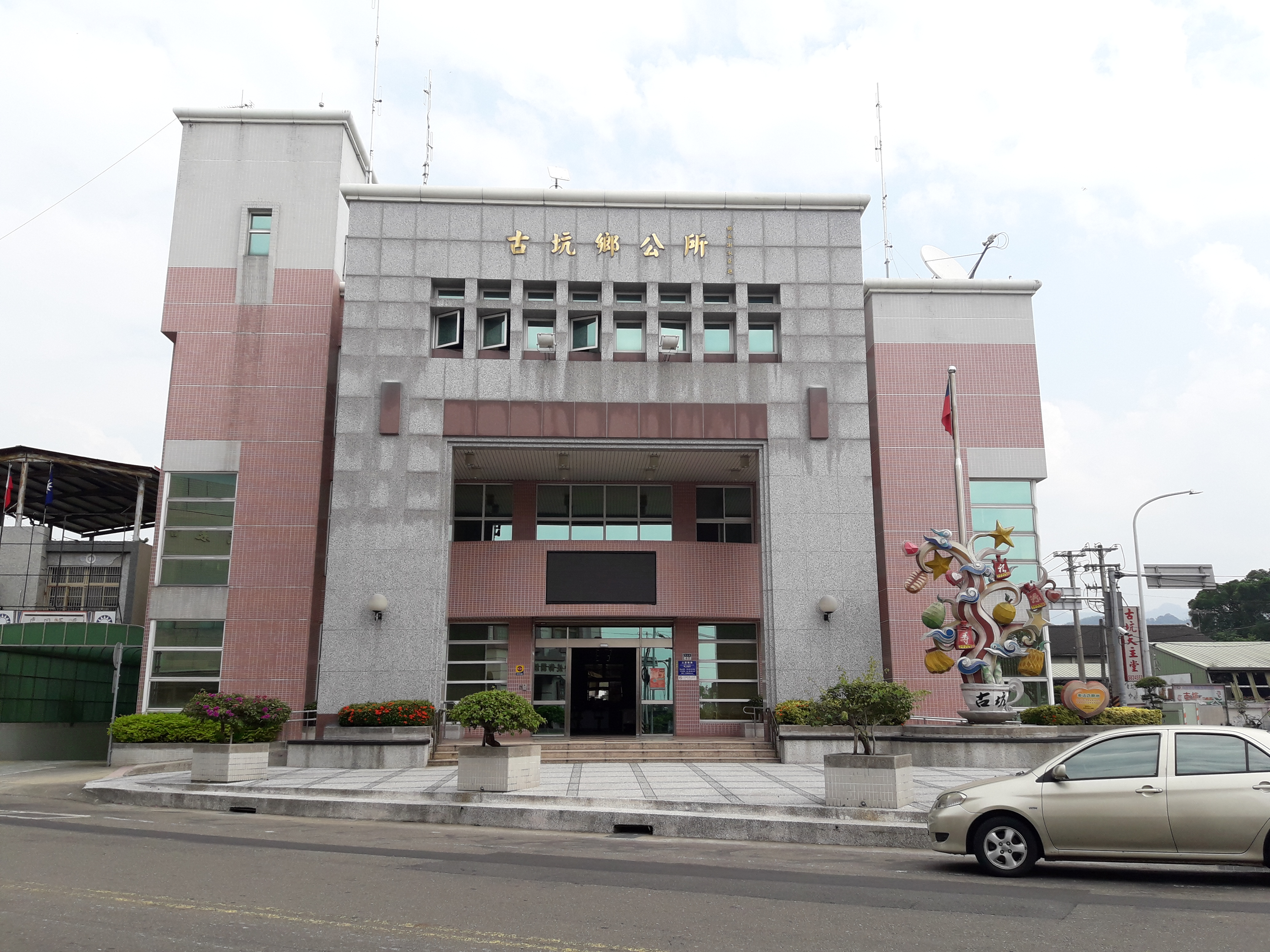
Gukeng Township Office

Gukeng Township (Chinese: 古坑鄉; pinyin: Gǔkēng Xiāng; Wade–Giles: Ku^{L^{3}}-k'eng^{1} Hsiang^{1}) is a rural township in the easternmost part of Yunlin County, Taiwan. It is the largest township in the county.

== Geography ==
- Area: 116.61 km^{2}
- Population: 30,105 people (February 2023)

== Administrative divisions ==
Jipan, Xinzhuang, Tunghe, Hebao, Gaolin, Shuidui, Tianxin, Gukeng, Zhaoyang, Xiping, Nanzi, Yongguang, Yongchang, Mayuan, Kanjiao, Huanan, Huashan, Guilin, Zhanghu and Caoling Village.

== Economy ==
It is famous for agricultural produce, such as oranges, bamboo shoots, camellia oil and coffee bean.

== Tourist attractions ==
- 921 Feishan Viewing Platform
- Caoling
- Chi Guang Temple
- Honey Museum
- Huashan Leisure Area
- Janfusun Fancyworld
- Jiadong Walkway
- Penglai Waterfall
- Rocky Wall Ecology Park
- Taiwan Caoling National Geological Park
- Ten Thousand Year Gorge
