= 1968 Hyūga-nada earthquake =

Earthquake in Hyūga-nada

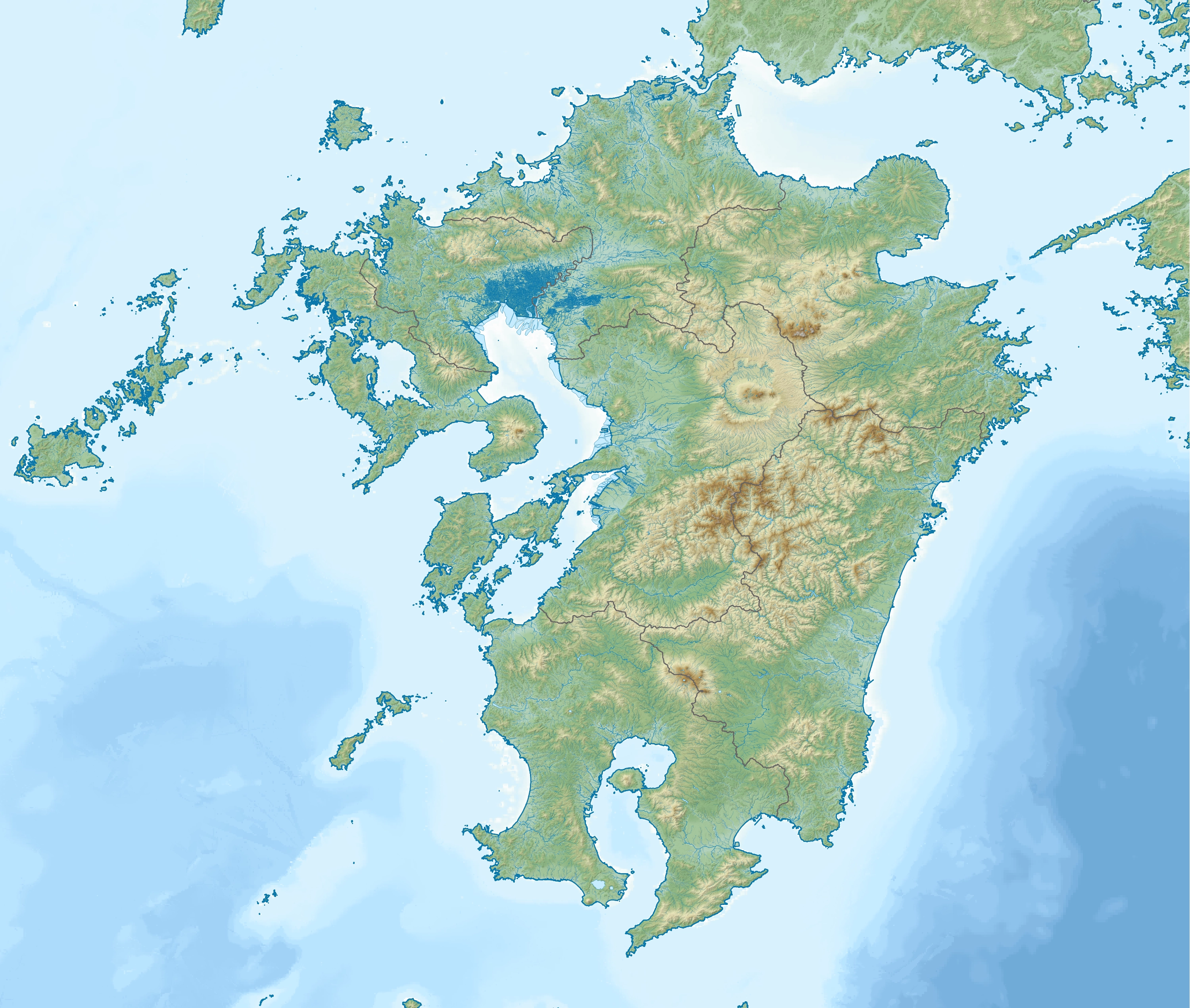
- Location within Kyushu Location within Japan
- UTC time: 1968-04-01 00:42:07
- ISC event: 823387
- USGS-ANSS: ComCat
- Local date: April 1, 1968
- Local time: 09:42:07
- Magnitude: 7.5 M_{w}
- Depth: 30 km
- Epicenter: 32.45°N 132.27°E
- Areas affected: Japan
- Max. intensity: JMA 5−–JMA 5+ MMI VII (Very strong)
- Tsunami: Yes
- Casualties: 1 dead, 22 injured

The 1968 Hyūga-nada earthquake (Japanese: 1968年日向灘地震) occurred on April 1 at 09:42 local time. The earthquake had a magnitude of M_{w} 7.5, and the epicenter was located in Hyūga-nada Sea, off the islands of Kyushu and Shikoku, Japan. The magnitude of this earthquake was also given as M_{JMA} 7.5. A tsunami was observed. One person was killed, and 22 people were reported injured. The intensity reached shindo 5 in Miyazaki and Kōchi.

== Description ==
This was an interplate earthquake between the Eurasian plate and the Philippine Sea plate. In this region, the Philippine Sea plate is subducting beneath the Eurasian plate. The subduction interface around this region passes southwestwards from the Nankai megathrust to the Ryukyu Trench just south of Kyusyu.

This earthquake is the strongest event recorded in the Hyūga-nada Sea region. The maximum slip was estimated to be 4 m. It was estimated that, in the Hyūga-nada Sea region, earthquakes with magnitudes about 7.6 occur with a period of about 200 years, while earthquakes with magnitudes about 7.1 occur with a period of about 20 to 27 years. It has been pointed out that there is a tendency of occurrence of inland earthquakes in Kyushu before and after large interplate earthquakes in the Hyūga-nada Sea region.

== See also ==
- 1662 Hyūga-nada earthquake
- 1941 Hyūga-nada earthquake
- 2024 Hyūga-nada earthquake
- List of earthquakes in 1968
- List of earthquakes in Japan
