= 1982 Flores earthquake =

Earthquake in Indonesia

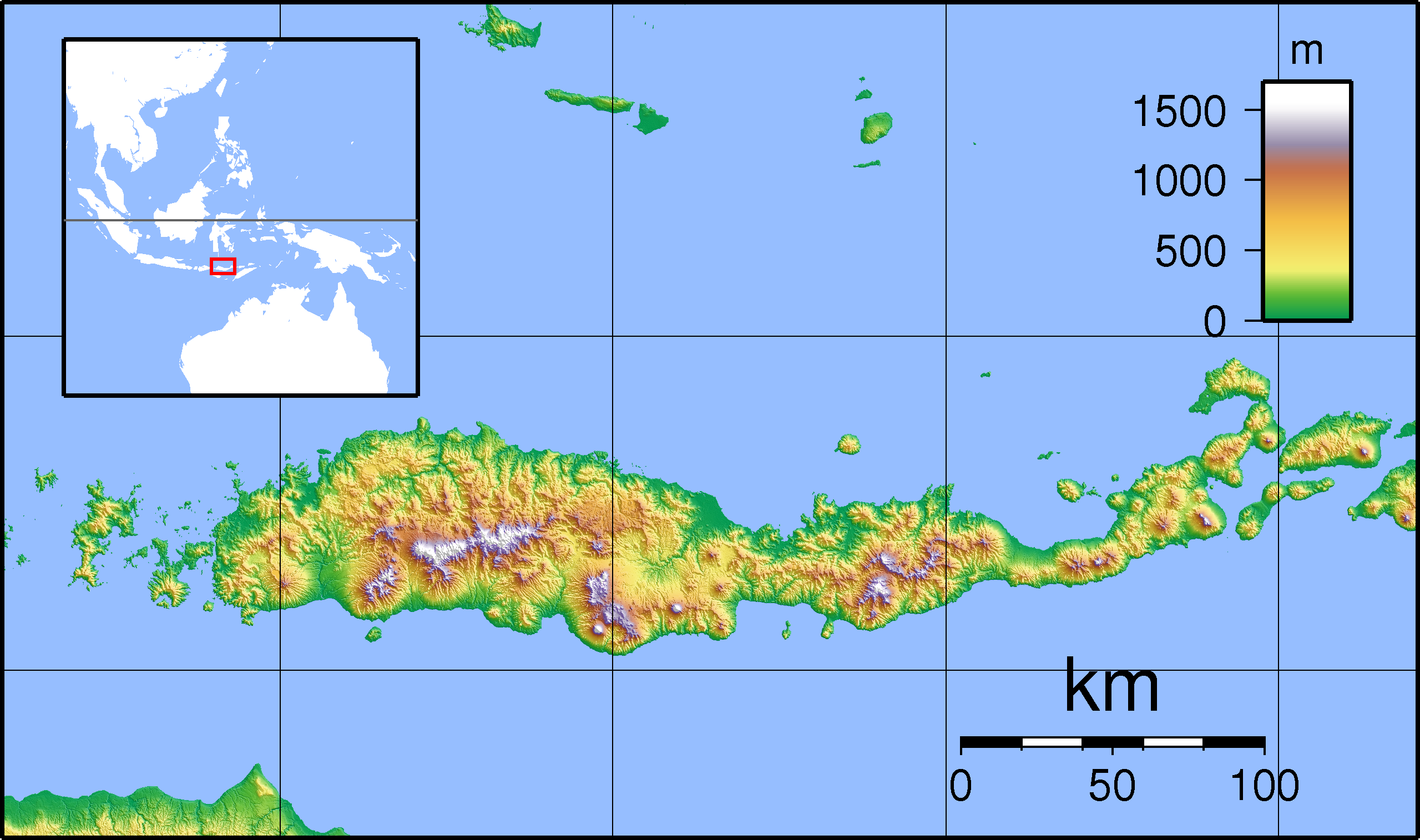
- Location within Indonesia Location within Flores
- UTC time: 1982-12-25 12:28:02
- ISC event: 587394
- USGS-ANSS: ComCat
- Local date: December 25, 1982
- Local time: 20:28
- Duration: 7 seconds
- Magnitude: 5.9 M_{w}
- Depth: 10 km (6 mi)
- Epicenter: 8.36°S 123.07°E
- Type: Strike-slip
- Total damage: $1.45 million
- Max. intensity: MMI VIII (Severe)
- Casualties: 13 dead 390 injured

The 1982 Flores earthquake struck the island of Flores in Indonesia on December 25. Registering a moment magnitude of 5.9, according to the International Seismological Centre, it created landslides and was reportedly accompanied by a tsunami. The earthquake killed thirteen people and left 390 injured, also destroying 1,875 houses and 121 other buildings. The villages of Layahong and Oyong Barang were damaged by seven seconds of shaking.

== Tectonic setting ==
The Lesser Sunda Islands lie in a region with frequent seismicity, and there is a history of tsunamis in the area. Both the subduction of the Australian plate and the crust in the Flores Sea could be responsible for this activity.

== Impact ==
The five most affected districts were evacuated of 6,000 people. The local and regional governments were petitioned for supplies like tents, medicine, and food. The earthquake was followed by several aftershocks.

== See also ==
- 1992 Flores earthquake and tsunami
