= Hyūga Sea =

Sea in Japan

Coordinates: 32°00′N 131°35′E

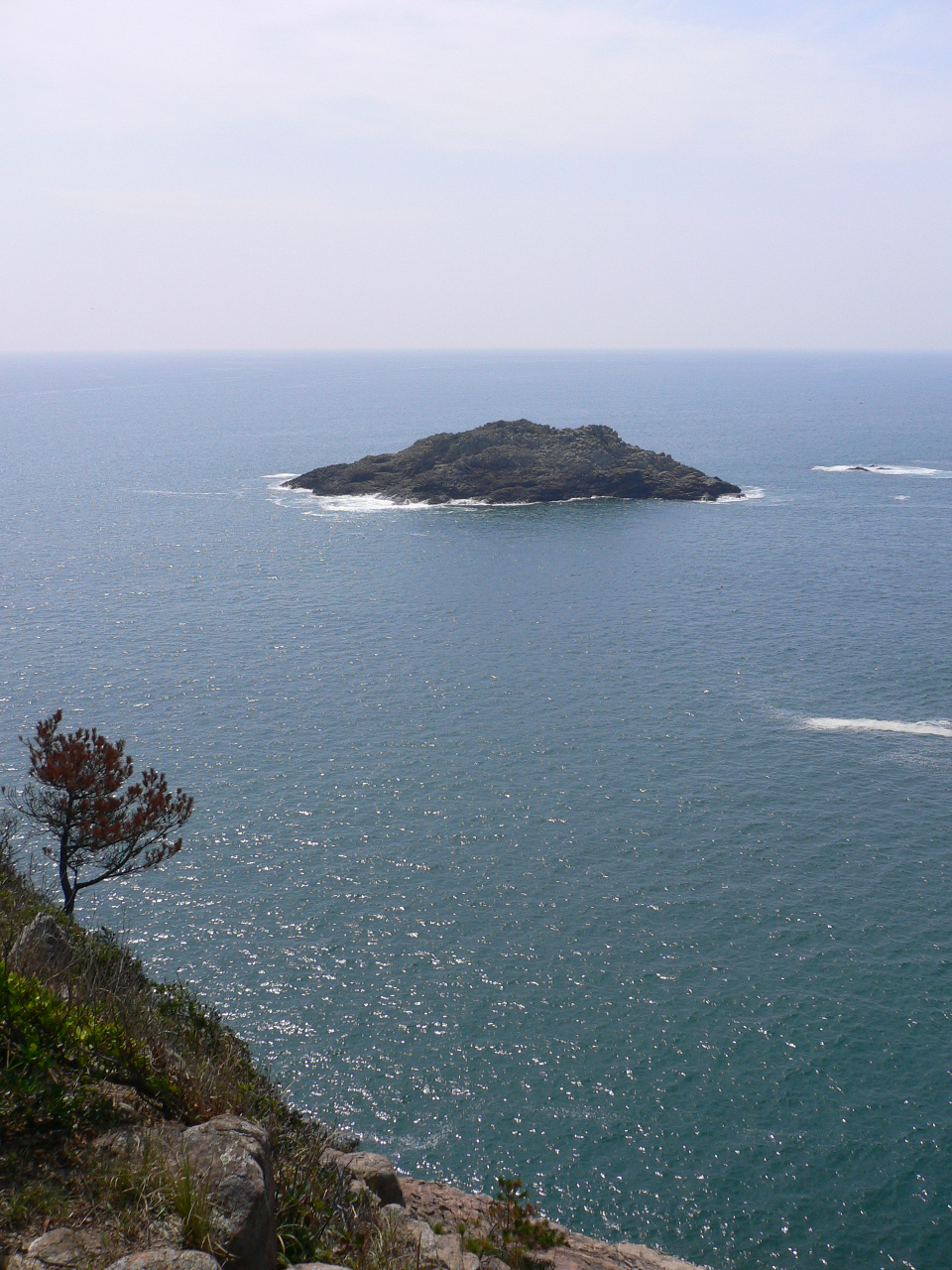
An island in the Hyuga-nada Sea

Location of Hyuga Nada

The Hyūga Nada (Japanese: 日向灘) is the part of the Pacific Ocean that lies off the eastern shore of the island of Kyushu, to the south-west of the island of Honshu, off the south coast of Japan. Its name is derived from the former province of Hyūga, which corresponded to the prefecture of Miyazaki before the Meiji Restoration. Also, earthquakes occur repeatedly in Hyuga Nada (For example, 1968 Hyuga-nada earthquake).

== See also ==
- Hyūga Province
- 1968 Hyuga-nada earthquake
