= List of townships/cities and districts in Taiwan =

The Republic of China (ROC) is divided into eight provincial-level divisions which consists of two streamlined provinces of Taiwan and Fujian along with six special municipalities. This is a list of townships/cities and districts in statistical order. There are 368 such divisions under its territorial control.

Cities and townships of Taiwan

Cities districts and townships of Taiwan

Code	Province	County/City	English name	Native name	Pinyin	Type	Population (Note: January 2020)	Area (km^{2})	Population density (/km^{2})	Population 2010 (Note: December 2010)	Population change (Note: January 2020−December 2010)
65000010	New Taipei City		Banqiao District	板橋區		District	557,120	23.14	24,076.06	554,596	+2,524
65000020	New Taipei City		Sanchong District	三重區		District	386,236	16.32	23,666.42	389,968	−3,732
65000030	New Taipei City		Zhonghe District	中和區		District	413,067	20.14	20,509.78	414,356	−1,289
65000040	New Taipei City		Yonghe District	永和區		District	220,619	5.71	38,637.30	234,536	−13,917
65000050	New Taipei City		Xinzhuang District	新莊區		District	420,684	19.74	21,311.25	402,204	+18,480
65000060	New Taipei City		Xindian District	新店區		District	303,624	120.23	2,525.36	296,411	+7,213
65000070	New Taipei City		Shulin District	樹林區		District	183,906	33.13	5,551.04	176,077	+7,829
65000080	New Taipei City		Yingge District	鶯歌區		District	86,945	21.12	4,116.71	86,821	+124
65000090	New Taipei City		Sanxia District	三峽區		District	116,587	191.45	608.97	103,450	+13,137
65000100	New Taipei City		Tamsui District	淡水區		District	179,036	70.66	2,533.77	143,481	+35,555
65000110	New Taipei City		Xizhi District	汐止區		District	203,621	71.24	2,858.24	189,618	+14,003
65000120	New Taipei City		Ruifang District	瑞芳區		District	39,495	70.73	558.39	42,432	−2,937
65000130	New Taipei City		Tucheng District	土城區		District	237,762	29.56	8,043.37	238,477	−715
65000140	New Taipei City		Luzhou District	蘆洲區		District	202,026	7.44	27,154.03	197,793	+4,233
65000150	New Taipei City		Wugu District	五股區		District	88,165	34.86	2,529.12	79,958	+8,207
65000160	New Taipei City		Taishan District	泰山區		District	78,731	19.16	4,109.13	76,470	+2,261
65000170	New Taipei City		Linkou District	林口區		District	116,000	54.15	2,142.20	83,165	+32,835
65000180	New Taipei City		Shenkeng District	深坑區		District	23,714	20.58	1,152.28	23,241	+473
65000190	New Taipei City		Shiding District	石碇區		District	7,622	144.35	52.80	7,973	−351
65000200	New Taipei City		Pinglin District	坪林區		District	6,698	170.84	39.21	6,537	+161
65000210	New Taipei City		Sanzhi District	三芝區		District	22,721	65.99	344.31	23,263	−542
65000220	New Taipei City		Shimen District	石門區		District	11,816	51.26	230.51	12,700	−884
65000230	New Taipei City		Bali District	八里區		District	39,555	39.49	1,001.65	34,791	+4,764
65000240	New Taipei City		Pingxi District	平溪區		District	4,533	71.34	63.54	5,344	−811
65000250	New Taipei City		Shuangxi District	雙溪區		District	8,632	146.25	59.02	9,729	−1,097
65000260	New Taipei City		Gongliao District	貢寮區		District	12,006	99.97	120.10	13,776	−1,770
65000270	New Taipei City		Jinshan District	金山區		District	21,377	49.21	434.40	22,380	−1,003
65000280	New Taipei City		Wanli District	萬里區		District	21,840	63.38	344.59	22,009	−169
65000290	New Taipei City		Wulai District	烏來區		Mountain indigenous district	6,434	321.13	20.04	5,811	+623
63000010	Taipei City		Songshan District	松山區		District	204,043	9.29	21,963.72	208,434	−4,391
63000020	Taipei City		Xinyi District	信義區		District	219,744	11.21	19,602.50	225,092	−5,348
63000030	Taipei City		Daan District	大安區		District	307,526	11.36	27,070.95	311,565	−4,039
63000040	Taipei City		Zhongshan District	中山區		District	227,266	13.68	16,613.01	220,126	+7,140
63000050	Taipei City		Zhongzheng District	中正區		District	157,743	7.61	20,728.38	159,536	−1,793
63000060	Taipei City		Datong District	大同區		District	125,909	5.68	22,167.08	124,600	+1,309
63000070	Taipei City		Wanhua District	萬華區		District	186,848	8.85	21,112.77	189,099	−2,251
63000080	Taipei City		Wenshan District	文山區		District	271,674	31.51	8,621.83	262,307	+9,367
63000090	Taipei City		Nangang District	南港區		District	120,161	21.84	5,501.88	114,023	+6,138
63000100	Taipei City		Neihu District	內湖區		District	285,526	31.58	9,041.36	270,245	+15,281
63000110	Taipei City		Shilin District	士林區		District	283,282	62.37	4,541.96	284,539	−1,257
63000120	Taipei City		Beitou District	北投區		District	253,155	56.82	4,455.39	249,206	+3,949
68000010	Taoyuan City		Taoyuan District	桃園區		District	453,275	34.80	13,025.14	406,851	+46,424
68000020	Taoyuan City		Zhongli District	中壢區		District	417,671	76.52	5,458.32	369,770	+47,901
68000030	Taoyuan City		Daxi District	大溪區		District	95,576	105.12	909.21	92,081	+3,495
68000040	Taoyuan City		Yangmei District	楊梅區		District	173,252	89.12	1,944.03	150,926	+22,326
68000050	Taoyuan City		Luzhu District	蘆竹區		District	166,497	75.50	2,205.26	142,120	+24,377
68000060	Taoyuan City		Dayuan District	大園區		District	93,087	87.39	1,065.19	81,966	+11,121
68000070	Taoyuan City		Guishan District	龜山區		District	163,082	72.02	2,264.40	137,996	+25,086
68000080	Taoyuan City		Bade District	八德區		District	206,409	33.71	6,123.08	176,868	+29,541
68000090	Taoyuan City		Longtan District	龍潭區		District	124,040	75.23	1,648.81	115,166	+8,874
68000100	Taoyuan City		Pingzhen District	平鎮區		District	228,519	47.75	4,785.74	207,457	+21,062
68000110	Taoyuan City		Xinwu District	新屋區		District	49,290	85.02	579.75	49,112	+178
68000120	Taoyuan City		Guanyin District	觀音區		District	68,034	87.98	773.29	61,077	+6,957
68000130	Taoyuan City		Fuxing District	復興區		Mountain indigenous district	12,222	350.78	34.84	10,670	+1,552
66000010	Taichung City		Central District	中區		District	18,395	0.88	20,903.41	22,472	−4,077
66000020	Taichung City		East District	東區		District	75,900	9.29	8,170.08	73,969	+1,931
66000030	Taichung City		South District	南區		District	126,645	6.81	18,596.92	113,659	+12,986
66000040	Taichung City		West District	西區		District	115,289	5.70	20,226.14	117,365	−2,076
66000050	Taichung City		North District	北區		District	147,379	6.94	21,236.17	147,639	−260
66000060	Taichung City		Xitun District	西屯區		District	230,611	39.85	5,786.98	206,536	+24,075
66000070	Taichung City		Nantun District	南屯區		District	173,815	31.26	5,560.30	153,779	+20,036
66000080	Taichung City		Beitun District	北屯區		District	283,755	62.70	4,525.60	246,880	+36,875
66000090	Taichung City		Fengyuan District	豐原區		District	166,812	41.18	4,050.80	165,433	+1,379
66000100	Taichung City		Dongshi District	東勢區		District	49,705	117.41	423.35	53,259	−3,554
66000110	Taichung City		Dajia District	大甲區		District	76,769	58.52	1,311.84	78,387	−1,618
66000120	Taichung City		Qingshui District	清水區		District	87,575	64.17	1,364.73	85,620	+1,955
66000130	Taichung City		Shalu District	沙鹿區		District	94,815	40.46	2,343.43	81,534	+13,281
66000140	Taichung City		Wuqi District	梧棲區		District	58,902	16.60	3,548.31	55,262	+3,640
66000150	Taichung City		Houli District	后里區		District	54,626	58.94	926.81	54,287	+339
66000160	Taichung City		Shengang District	神岡區		District	65,699	35.04	1,874.97	63,753	+1,946
66000170	Taichung City		Tanzi District	潭子區		District	109,351	25.85	4,230.21	100,481	+8,870
66000180	Taichung City		Daya District	大雅區		District	95,736	32.41	2,953.90	89,825	+5,911
66000190	Taichung City		Xinshe District	新社區		District	24,287	68.89	352.55	25,637	−1,350
66000200	Taichung City		Shigang District	石岡區		District	14,742	18.21	809.56	15,976	−1,234
66000210	Taichung City		Waipu District	外埔區		District	32,180	42.41	758.78	32,051	+129
66000220	Taichung City		Daan District	大安區		District	19,086	27.40	696.57	20,308	−1,222
66000230	Taichung City		Wuri District	烏日區		District	75,635	43.40	1,742.74	68,709	+6,926
66000240	Taichung City		Dadu District	大肚區		District	57,075	37.00	1,542.57	55,725	+1,350
66000250	Taichung City		Longjing District	龍井區		District	78,024	38.04	2,051.10	74,474	+3,550
66000260	Taichung City		Wufeng District	霧峰區		District	65,381	98.08	666.61	63,975	+1,406
66000270	Taichung City		Taiping District	太平區		District	193,879	120.75	1,605.62	172,965	+20,914
66000280	Taichung City		Dali District	大里區		District	212,738	28.88	7,366.27	197,716	+15,022
66000290	Taichung City		Heping District	和平區		Mountain indigenous district	10,898	1,037.82	10.50	10,743	+155
67000010	Tainan City		Xinying District	新營區		District	76,966	38.54	1,997.04	78,105	−1,139
67000020	Tainan City		Yanshuei District	鹽水區		District	25,201	52.25	482.32	27,160	−1,959
67000030	Tainan City		Baihe District	白河區		District	27,656	126.40	218.80	31,395	−3,739
67000040	Tainan City		Liouying District	柳營區		District	21,022	61.29	342.99	22,726	−1,704
67000050	Tainan City		Houbi District	後壁區		District	22,980	72.22	318.19	25,884	−2,904
67000060	Tainan City		Dongshan District	東山區		District	20,405	124.92	163.34	23,117	−2,712
67000070	Tainan City		Madou District	麻豆區		District	43,960	53.97	814.53	45,795	−1,835
67000080	Tainan City		Xiaying District	下營區		District	23,643	33.53	705.13	26,119	−2,476
67000090	Tainan City		Lioujia District	六甲區		District	21,855	67.55	323.54	23,694	−1,839
67000100	Tainan City		Guantian District	官田區		District	21,364	70.80	301.75	22,212	−848
67000110	Tainan City		Danei District	大內區		District	9,373	70.31	133.31	10,899	−1,526
67000120	Tainan City		Jiali District	佳里區		District	59,085	38.94	1,517.33	59,269	−184
67000130	Tainan City		Syuejia District	學甲區		District	25,474	53.99	471.83	27,864	−2,390
67000140	Tainan City		Sigang District	西港區		District	24,553	33.77	727.07	25,200	−647
67000150	Tainan City		Cigu District	七股區		District	22,308	110.15	202.52	24,815	−2,507
67000160	Tainan City		Jiangjun District	將軍區		District	19,321	41.98	460.24	21,579	−2,258
67000170	Tainan City		Beimen District	北門區		District	10,796	44.10	244.81	12,468	−1,672
67000180	Tainan City		Xinhua District	新化區		District	43,228	62.06	696.55	44,096	−868
67000190	Tainan City		Shanhua District	善化區		District	50,039	55.31	904.70	43,477	+6,562
67000200	Tainan City		Sinshih District	新市區		District	37,282	47.81	779.80	34,740	+2,542
67000210	Tainan City		Anding District	安定區		District	30,375	31.27	971.38	30,232	+143
67000220	Tainan City		Shanshang District	山上區		District	7,177	27.88	257.42	7,864	−687
67000230	Tainan City		Yujing District	玉井區		District	13,750	76.37	180.04	15,413	−1,663
67000240	Tainan City		Nansi District	楠西區		District	9,305	109.63	84.88	10,663	−1,358
67000250	Tainan City		Nanhua District	南化區		District	8,576	171.52	50.00	8,925	−349
67000260	Tainan City		Zuojhen District	左鎮區		District	4,668	74.90	62.32	5,492	−824
67000270	Tainan City		Rende District	仁德區		District	76,088	50.77	1,498.68	69,343	+6,745
67000280	Tainan City		Gueiren District	歸仁區		District	68,157	55.79	1,221.67	65,819	+2,338
67000290	Tainan City		Guanmiao District	關廟區		District	34,199	53.64	637.57	36,026	−1,827
67000300	Tainan City		Longci District	龍崎區		District	3,875	64.08	60.47	4,382	−507
67000310	Tainan City		Yongkang District	永康區		District	235,798	40.28	5,853.97	216,748	+19,050
67000320	Tainan City		East District	東區		District	185,903	13.42	13,852.68	194,183	−8,280
67000330	Tainan City		South District	南區		District	124,676	27.27	4,571.91	126,173	−1,497
67000340	Tainan City		North District	北區		District	131,370	10.43	12,595.40	131,925	−555
67000350	Tainan City		Annan District	安南區		District	194,189	107.20	1,811.46	178,119	+16,070
67000360	Tainan City		Anping District	安平區		District	67,105	11.07	6,061.88	62,602	+4,503
67000370	Tainan City		West Central District	中西區		District	78,494	6.26	12,538.98	79,271	−777
64000010	Kaohsiung City		Yancheng District	鹽埕區		District	23,918	1.42	16,843.66	27,399	−3,481
64000020	Kaohsiung City		Gushan District	鼓山區		District	141,208	14.75	9,573.42	131,728	+9,480
64000030	Kaohsiung City		Zuoying District	左營區		District	197,877	19.38	10,210.37	191,991	+5,886
64000040	Kaohsiung City		Nanzih District	楠梓區		District	188,241	25.83	7,287.69	173,053	+15,188
64000050	Kaohsiung City		Sanmin District	三民區		District	339,528	19.79	17,156.54	354,022	−14,494
64000060	Kaohsiung City		Sinsing District	新興區		District	51,036	1.98	25,775.76	55,287	−4,251
64000070	Kaohsiung City		Qianjin District	前金區		District	26,908	1.86	14,466.67	28,859	−1,951
64000080	Kaohsiung City		Lingya District	苓雅區		District	168,826	8.15	20,714.85	183,948	−15,122
64000090	Kaohsiung City		Cianjhen District	前鎮區		District	187,560	19.12	9,809.62	199,144	−11,584
64000100	Kaohsiung City		Cijin District	旗津區		District	28,069	1.46	19,225.34	29,968	−1,899
64000110	Kaohsiung City		Siaogang District	小港區		District	157,901	45.44	3,474.93	154,548	+3,353
64000120	Kaohsiung City		Fongshan District	鳳山區		District	360,108	26.76	13,456.95	341,120	+18,988
64000130	Kaohsiung City		Linyuan District	林園區		District	69,598	32.29	2,155.40	70,512	−914
64000140	Kaohsiung City		Daliao District	大寮區		District	112,286	71.04	1,580.60	108,984	+3,302
64000150	Kaohsiung City		Dashu District	大樹區		District	42,082	66.98	628.28	43,955	−1,873
64000160	Kaohsiung City		Dashe District	大社區		District	34,420	26.58	1,294.96	32,941	+1,479
64000170	Kaohsiung City		Renwu District	仁武區		District	89,805	36.08	2,489.05	72,202	+17,603
64000180	Kaohsiung City		Niaosong District	鳥松區		District	44,925	24.59	1,826.96	42,595	+2,330
64000190	Kaohsiung City		Gangshan District	岡山區		District	97,150	47.94	2,026.49	97,102	+48
64000200	Kaohsiung City		Ciaotou District	橋頭區		District	38,322	25.94	1,477.33	36,415	+1,907
64000210	Kaohsiung City		Yanchao District	燕巢區		District	29,673	65.40	453.72	30,790	−1,117
64000220	Kaohsiung City		Tianliao District	田寮區		District	7,036	92.68	75.92	8,214	−1,178
64000230	Kaohsiung City		Alian District	阿蓮區		District	28,508	34.62	823.45	30,383	−1,875
64000240	Kaohsiung City		Lujhu District	路竹區		District	52,188	48.43	1,077.60	53,791	−1,603
64000250	Kaohsiung City		Hunei District	湖內區		District	29,721	20.16	1,474.26	28,827	+894
64000260	Kaohsiung City		Qieding District	茄萣區		District	30,031	15.76	1,905.52	31,433	−1,402
64000270	Kaohsiung City		Yong'an District	永安區		District	13,766	22.61	608.85	14,301	−535
64000280	Kaohsiung City		Mituo District	彌陀區		District	19,025	14.78	1,287.21	20,433	−1,408
64000290	Kaohsiung City		Ziguan District	梓官區		District	35,741	11.60	3,081.12	36,726	−985
64000300	Kaohsiung City		Cishan District	旗山區		District	36,287	94.61	383.54	39,873	−3,586
64000310	Kaohsiung City		Meinong District	美濃區		District	39,092	120.03	325.69	42,993	−3,901
64000320	Kaohsiung City		Liouguei District	六龜區		District	12,619	194.16	64.99	14,833	−2,214
64000330	Kaohsiung City		Jiasian District	甲仙區		District	5,925	124.03	47.77	7,228	−1,303
64000340	Kaohsiung City		Shanlin District	杉林區		District	11,662	104.00	112.13	11,842	−180
64000350	Kaohsiung City		Neimen District	內門區		District	14,184	95.62	148.34	15,951	−1,767
64000360	Kaohsiung City		Maolin District	茂林區		Mountain indigenous district	1,941	194.00	10.01	1,874	+67
64000370	Kaohsiung City		Taoyuan District	桃源區		Mountain indigenous district	4,256	928.98	4.58	4,817	−561
64000380	Kaohsiung City		Namasia District	那瑪夏區		Mountain indigenous district	3,148	252.99	12.44	3,401	−253
10002010	Taiwan Province	Yilan County	Yilan City	宜蘭市		County-administered city	95,589	29.41	3,250.22	95,568	+21
10002020	Taiwan Province	Yilan County	Luodong Township	羅東鎮		Urban township	71,897	11.34	6,340.12	72,958	−1,061
10002030	Taiwan Province	Yilan County	Su'ao Township	蘇澳鎮		Urban township	39,132	89.02	439.59	42,986	−3,854
10002040	Taiwan Province	Yilan County	Toucheng Township	頭城鎮		Urban township	28,951	100.89	286.96	30,899	−1,948
10002050	Taiwan Province	Yilan County	Jiaoxi Township	礁溪鄉		Rural township	35,404	101.43	349.05	35,876	−472
10002060	Taiwan Province	Yilan County	Zhuangwei Township	壯圍鄉		Rural township	24,390	38.48	633.84	25,004	−614
10002070	Taiwan Province	Yilan County	Yuanshan Township	員山鄉		Rural township	32,297	111.91	288.60	32,347	−50
10002080	Taiwan Province	Yilan County	Dongshan Township	冬山鄉		Rural township	53,111	79.86	665.05	52,635	+476
10002090	Taiwan Province	Yilan County	Wujie Township	五結鄉		Rural township	40,034	38.87	1,029.95	38,850	+1,184
10002100	Taiwan Province	Yilan County	Sanxing Township	三星鄉		Rural township	21,251	144.22	147.35	21,362	−111
10002110	Taiwan Province	Yilan County	Datong Township	大同鄉		Mountain indigenous township	6,141	657.54	9.34	5,987	+154
10002120	Taiwan Province	Yilan County	Nan'ao Township	南澳鄉		Mountain indigenous township	5,964	740.65	8.05	6,014	−50
10004010	Taiwan Province	Hsinchu County	Zhubei City	竹北市		County-administered city	194,941	46.83	4,162.74	141,852	+53,089
10004040	Taiwan Province	Hsinchu County	Guanxi Township	關西鎮		Urban township	28,034	125.52	223.34	31,775	−3,741
10004030	Taiwan Province	Hsinchu County	Xinpu Township	新埔鎮		Urban township	32,838	72.19	454.88	35,495	−2,657
10004020	Taiwan Province	Hsinchu County	Zhudong Township	竹東鎮		Urban township	97,140	53.51	1,815.36	96,751	+389
10004050	Taiwan Province	Hsinchu County	Hukou Township	湖口鄉		Rural township	77,914	58.43	1,333.46	75,408	+2,506
10004080	Taiwan Province	Hsinchu County	Hengshan Township	橫山鄉		Rural township	12,771	66.35	192.48	14,368	−1,597
10004060	Taiwan Province	Hsinchu County	Xinfeng Township	新豐鄉		Rural township	57,269	46.35	1,235.58	53,288	+3,981
10004070	Taiwan Province	Hsinchu County	Qionglin Township	芎林鄉		Rural township	19,926	40.79	488.50	20,778	−852
10004100	Taiwan Province	Hsinchu County	Baoshan Township	寶山鄉		Rural township	14,615	64.79	225.57	14,078	+537
10004090	Taiwan Province	Hsinchu County	Beipu Township	北埔鄉		Rural township	9,172	50.67	181.01	10,119	−947
10004110	Taiwan Province	Hsinchu County	Emei Township	峨眉鄉		Rural township	5,467	46.80	116.82	5,999	−532
10004120	Taiwan Province	Hsinchu County	Jianshi Township	尖石鄉		Mountain indigenous township	9,637	527.58	18.27	8,439	+1,198
10004130	Taiwan Province	Hsinchu County	Wufeng Township	五峰鄉		Mountain indigenous township	4,572	227.73	20.08	4,665	−93
10005010	Taiwan Province	Miaoli County	Miaoli City	苗栗市		County-administered city	87,960	37.89	2,321.46	90,703	−2,743
10005050	Taiwan Province	Miaoli County	Toufen City	頭份市		County-administered city	103,806	53.32	1,946.85	97,150	+6,656
10005020	Taiwan Province	Miaoli County	Yuanli Township	苑裡鎮		Urban township	44,857	68.25	657.25	48,645	−3,788
10005030	Taiwan Province	Miaoli County	Tongxiao Township	通霄鎮		Urban township	33,423	107.85	309.90	37,977	−4,554
10005040	Taiwan Province	Miaoli County	Zhunan Township	竹南鎮		Urban township	86,614	37.56	2,306.02	78,420	+8,194
10005060	Taiwan Province	Miaoli County	Houlong Township	後龍鎮		Urban township	35,665	75.81	470.45	39,389	−3,724
10005070	Taiwan Province	Miaoli County	Zhuolan Township	卓蘭鎮		Urban township	16,439	76.32	215.40	18,446	−2,007
10005080	Taiwan Province	Miaoli County	Dahu Township	大湖鄉		Rural township	14,170	90.84	155.99	16,052	−1,882
10005090	Taiwan Province	Miaoli County	Gongguan Township	公館鄉		Rural township	32,754	71.45	458.42	34,745	−1,991
10005100	Taiwan Province	Miaoli County	Tongluo Township	銅鑼鄉		Rural township	17,579	78.38	224.28	19,401	−1,822
10005110	Taiwan Province	Miaoli County	Nanzhuang Township	南庄鄉		Rural township	9,796	165.49	59.19	11,117	−1,321
10005120	Taiwan Province	Miaoli County	Touwu Township	頭屋鄉		Rural township	10,455	52.50	199.14	11,605	−1,150
10005130	Taiwan Province	Miaoli County	Sanyi Township	三義鄉		Rural township	15,957	69.34	230.13	17,548	−1,591
10005140	Taiwan Province	Miaoli County	Xihu Township	西湖鄉		Rural township	6,860	41.08	166.99	7,869	−1,009
10005150	Taiwan Province	Miaoli County	Zaoqiao Township	造橋鄉		Rural township	12,452	48.00	259.42	13,727	−1,275
10005160	Taiwan Province	Miaoli County	Sanwan Township	三灣鄉		Rural township	6,526	52.30	124.78	7,264	−738
10005170	Taiwan Province	Miaoli County	Shitan Township	獅潭鄉		Rural township	4,228	79.43	53.23	4,928	−700
10005180	Taiwan Province	Miaoli County	Tai'an Township	泰安鄉		Mountain indigenous township	5,892	614.51	9.59	5,982	−90
10007010	Taiwan Province	Changhua County	Changhua City	彰化市		County-administered city	232,295	65.69	3,536.23	236,503	−4,208
10007100	Taiwan Province	Changhua County	Yuanlin City	員林市		County-administered city	125,071	40.04	3,123.65	125,476	−405
10007020	Taiwan Province	Changhua County	Lukang Township	鹿港鎮		Urban township	86,929	39.46	2,202.97	85,325	+1,604
10007030	Taiwan Province	Changhua County	Hemei Township	和美鎮		Urban township	90,502	39.93	2,266.52	89,723	+779
10007190	Taiwan Province	Changhua County	Beidou Township	北斗鎮		Urban township	33,330	19.25	1,731.43	33,516	−186
10007110	Taiwan Province	Changhua County	Xihu Township	溪湖鎮		Urban township	55,165	32.06	1,720.68	56,119	−954
10007120	Taiwan Province	Changhua County	Tianzhong Township	田中鎮		Urban township	41,225	34.61	1,191.13	44,065	−2,840
10007200	Taiwan Province	Changhua County	Erlin Township	二林鎮		Urban township	50,014	92.85	538.65	53,939	−3,925
10007040	Taiwan Province	Changhua County	Xianxi Township	線西鄉		Rural township	16,715	18.09	923.99	17,138	−423
10007050	Taiwan Province	Changhua County	Shengang Township	伸港鄉		Rural township	37,501	22.33	1,679.40	35,964	+1,537
10007060	Taiwan Province	Changhua County	Fuxing Township	福興鄉		Rural township	46,707	49.89	936.20	48,945	−2,238
10007070	Taiwan Province	Changhua County	Xiushui Township	秀水鄉		Rural township	39,078	29.34	1,331.90	39,122	−44
10007080	Taiwan Province	Changhua County	Huatan Township	花壇鄉		Rural township	45,514	36.35	1,252.10	46,187	−673
10007090	Taiwan Province	Changhua County	Fenyuan Township	芬園鄉		Rural township	23,372	38.02	614.73	24,814	−1,442
10007130	Taiwan Province	Changhua County	Dacun Township	大村鄉		Rural township	37,108	30.78	1,205.59	36,597	+511
10007140	Taiwan Province	Changhua County	Puyan Township	埔鹽鄉		Rural township	32,160	38.61	832.94	34,284	−2,124
10007150	Taiwan Province	Changhua County	Puxin Township	埔心鄉		Rural township	34,740	20.95	1,658.23	35,325	−585
10007160	Taiwan Province	Changhua County	Yongjing Township	永靖鄉		Rural township	36,595	20.64	1,773.01	39,269	−2,674
10007170	Taiwan Province	Changhua County	Shetou Township	社頭鄉		Rural township	42,563	36.14	1,177.73	44,767	−2,204
10007180	Taiwan Province	Changhua County	Ershui Township	二水鄉		Rural township	14,823	29.44	503.50	16,520	−1,697
10007210	Taiwan Province	Changhua County	Tianwei Township	田尾鄉		Rural township	26,973	24.04	1,122.00	28,639	−1,666
10007220	Taiwan Province	Changhua County	Pitou Township	埤頭鄉		Rural township	30,388	42.75	710.83	31,771	−1,383
10007230	Taiwan Province	Changhua County	Fangyuan Township	芳苑鄉		Rural township	33,046	91.38	361.63	36,320	−3,274
10007240	Taiwan Province	Changhua County	Dacheng Township	大城鄉		Rural township	16,345	63.74	256.43	18,936	−2,591
10007250	Taiwan Province	Changhua County	Zhutang Township	竹塘鄉		Rural township	14,920	42.17	353.81	16,470	−1,550
10007260	Taiwan Province	Changhua County	Xizhou Township	溪州鄉		Rural township	29,370	75.83	387.31	31,552	−2,182
10008010	Taiwan Province	Nantou County	Nantou City	南投市		County-administered city	99,224	71.60	1,385.81	104,083	−4,859
10008020	Taiwan Province	Nantou County	Puli Township	埔里鎮		Urban township	79,737	162.22	491.54	85,088	−5,351
10008030	Taiwan Province	Nantou County	Caotun Township	草屯鎮		Urban township	97,612	104.03	938.31	99,674	−2,062
10008040	Taiwan Province	Nantou County	Zhushan Township	竹山鎮		Urban township	53,920	247.33	218.01	58,338	−4,418
10008050	Taiwan Province	Nantou County	Jiji Township	集集鎮		Urban township	10,605	49.73	213.25	11,920	−1,315
10008060	Taiwan Province	Nantou County	Mingjian Township	名間鄉		Rural township	37,927	83.10	456.40	41,218	−3,291
10008070	Taiwan Province	Nantou County	Lugu Township	鹿谷鄉		Rural township	17,477	141.90	123.16	19,100	−1,623
10008080	Taiwan Province	Nantou County	Zhongliao Township	中寮鄉		Rural township	14,513	146.65	98.96	16,183	−1,670
10008090	Taiwan Province	Nantou County	Yuchi Township	魚池鄉		Rural township	15,624	121.37	128.73	17,181	−1,557
10008100	Taiwan Province	Nantou County	Guoxing Township	國姓鄉		Rural township	18,208	175.70	103.63	20,668	−2,460
10008110	Taiwan Province	Nantou County	Shuili Township	水里鄉		Rural township	17,241	106.84	161.37	20,063	−2,822
10008120	Taiwan Province	Nantou County	Xinyi Township	信義鄉		Mountain indigenous township	15,986	1,422.42	11.24	17,314	−1,328
10008130	Taiwan Province	Nantou County	Ren'ai Township	仁愛鄉		Mountain indigenous township	15,910	1,273.53	12.49	15,661	+249
10009010	Taiwan Province	Yunlin County	Douliu City	斗六市		County-administered city	108,634	93.72	1,159.13	106,854	+1,780
10009020	Taiwan Province	Yunlin County	Dounan Township	斗南鎮		Urban township	44,301	48.15	920.06	47,120	−2,819
10009030	Taiwan Province	Yunlin County	Huwei Township	虎尾鎮		Urban township	70,999	68.74	1,032.86	70,025	+974
10009040	Taiwan Province	Yunlin County	Xiluo Township	西螺鎮		Urban township	45,693	49.80	917.53	48,502	−2,809
10009050	Taiwan Province	Yunlin County	Tuku Township	土庫鎮		Urban township	28,505	49.02	581.50	30,476	−1,971
10009060	Taiwan Province	Yunlin County	Beigang Township	北港鎮		Urban township	39,363	41.50	948.51	43,059	−3,696
10009070	Taiwan Province	Yunlin County	Gukeng Township	古坑鄉		Rural township	31,179	166.61	187.14	34,061	−2,882
10009080	Taiwan Province	Yunlin County	Dapi Township	大埤鄉		Rural township	18,781	45.00	417.36	21,234	−2,453
10009090	Taiwan Province	Yunlin County	Cihtong Township	莿桐鄉		Rural township	28,525	50.85	560.96	30,477	−1,952
10009100	Taiwan Province	Yunlin County	Linnei Township	林內鄉		Rural township	17,755	37.60	472.21	19,720	−1,965
10009110	Taiwan Province	Yunlin County	Erlun Township	二崙鄉		Rural township	26,348	59.56	442.38	29,665	−3,317
10009120	Taiwan Province	Yunlin County	Lunbei Township	崙背鄉		Rural township	24,017	58.48	410.69	27,350	−3,333
10009130	Taiwan Province	Yunlin County	Mailiao Township	麥寮鄉		Rural township	47,253	80.17	589.41	37,029	+10,224
10009140	Taiwan Province	Yunlin County	Dongshi Township	東勢鄉		Rural township	14,407	48.36	297.91	16,780	−2,373
10009150	Taiwan Province	Yunlin County	Baozhong Township	褒忠鄉		Rural township	12,664	37.06	341.72	14,251	−1,587
10009160	Taiwan Province	Yunlin County	Taixi Township	臺西鄉		Rural township	23,268	54.10	430.09	26,223	−2,955
10009170	Taiwan Province	Yunlin County	Yuanchang Township	元長鄉		Rural township	25,080	71.59	350.33	28,795	−3,715
10009180	Taiwan Province	Yunlin County	Sihu Township	四湖鄉		Rural township	22,703	77.12	294.39	26,694	−3,991
10009190	Taiwan Province	Yunlin County	Kouhu Township	口湖鄉		Rural township	26,805	80.46	333.15	30,392	−3,587
10009200	Taiwan Province	Yunlin County	Shuilin Township	水林鄉		Rural township	24,683	72.96	338.31	28,946	−4,263
10010010	Taiwan Province	Chiayi County	Taibao City	太保市		County-administered city	38,307	66.90	572.60	36,685	+1,622
10010020	Taiwan Province	Chiayi County	Puzi City	朴子市		County-administered city	41,821	49.57	843.68	44,093	−2,272
10010030	Taiwan Province	Chiayi County	Budai Township	布袋鎮		Urban township	26,354	61.73	426.92	30,216	−3,862
10010040	Taiwan Province	Chiayi County	Dalin Township	大林鎮		Urban township	30,634	64.17	477.39	33,635	−3,001
10010050	Taiwan Province	Chiayi County	Minxiong Township	民雄鄉		Rural township	71,361	85.50	834.63	72,539	−1,178
10010060	Taiwan Province	Chiayi County	Xikou Township	溪口鄉		Rural township	14,292	33.05	432.44	16,269	−1,977
10010070	Taiwan Province	Chiayi County	Xingang Township	新港鄉		Rural township	31,397	66.05	475.35	34,676	−3,279
10010080	Taiwan Province	Chiayi County	Lioujiao Township	六腳鄉		Rural township	22,500	62.26	361.39	26,379	−3,879
10010090	Taiwan Province	Chiayi County	Dongshi Township	東石鄉		Rural township	24,154	81.58	296.08	27,741	−3,587
10010100	Taiwan Province	Chiayi County	Yizhu Township	義竹鄉		Rural township	17,832	79.29	224.90	21,129	−3,297
10010110	Taiwan Province	Chiayi County	Lucao Township	鹿草鄉		Rural township	15,099	54.32	277.96	17,232	−2,133
10010120	Taiwan Province	Chiayi County	Shuishang Township	水上鄉		Rural township	49,167	69.12	711.33	52,274	−3,107
10010130	Taiwan Province	Chiayi County	Zhongpu Township	中埔鄉		Rural township	44,314	129.50	342.19	47,579	−3,265
10010140	Taiwan Province	Chiayi County	Zhuqi Township	竹崎鄉		Rural township	35,167	162.23	216.77	38,608	−3,441
10010150	Taiwan Province	Chiayi County	Meishan Township	梅山鄉		Rural township	18,933	119.76	158.09	21,634	−2,701
10010160	Taiwan Province	Chiayi County	Fanlu Township	番路鄉		Rural township	11,249	117.53	95.71	11,684	−435
10010170	Taiwan Province	Chiayi County	Dapu Township	大埔鄉		Rural township	4,590	173.25	26.49	4,649	−59
10010180	Taiwan Province	Chiayi County	Alishan Township	阿里山鄉		Mountain indigenous township	5,547	427.85	12.96	6,226	−679
10013010	Taiwan Province	Pingtung County	Pingtung City	屏東市		County-administered city	198,795	65.07	3,055.09	211,027	−12,232
10013020	Taiwan Province	Pingtung County	Chaozhou Township	潮州鎮		Urban township	53,831	42.43	1,268.70	55,456	−1,625
10013030	Taiwan Province	Pingtung County	Donggang Township	東港鎮		Urban township	47,115	29.46	1,599.29	50,141	−3,026
10013040	Taiwan Province	Pingtung County	Hengchun Township	恆春鎮		Urban township	30,650	136.76	224.12	31,165	−515
10013050	Taiwan Province	Pingtung County	Wandan Township	萬丹鄉		Rural township	50,396	57.47	876.91	53,980	−3,584
10013060	Taiwan Province	Pingtung County	Changzhi Township	長治鄉		Rural township	29,549	39.89	740.76	30,944	−1,395
10013070	Taiwan Province	Pingtung County	Linluo Township	麟洛鄉		Rural township	10,903	16.26	670.54	11,516	−613
10013080	Taiwan Province	Pingtung County	Jiuru Township	九如鄉		Rural township	21,974	42.02	522.94	22,859	−885
10013090	Taiwan Province	Pingtung County	Ligang Township	里港鄉		Rural township	25,845	68.92	375.00	25,923	−78
10013100	Taiwan Province	Pingtung County	Yanpu Township	鹽埔鄉		Rural township	25,325	64.35	393.55	27,317	−1,992
10013110	Taiwan Province	Pingtung County	Gaoshu Township	高樹鄉		Rural township	23,966	90.15	265.85	26,797	−2,831
10013120	Taiwan Province	Pingtung County	Wanluan Township	萬巒鄉		Rural township	20,455	60.73	336.82	21,973	−1,518
10013130	Taiwan Province	Pingtung County	Neipu Township	內埔鄉		Rural township	53,575	81.86	654.47	57,955	−4,380
10013140	Taiwan Province	Pingtung County	Zhutian Township	竹田鄉		Rural township	16,843	29.07	579.39	18,425	−1,582
10013150	Taiwan Province	Pingtung County	Xinpi Township	新埤鄉		Rural township	9,734	59.01	164.96	10,706	−972
10013160	Taiwan Province	Pingtung County	Fangliao Township	枋寮鄉		Rural township	23,967	57.73	415.16	26,628	−2,661
10013170	Taiwan Province	Pingtung County	Xinyuan Township	新園鄉		Rural township	34,400	38.31	897.94	38,300	−3,900
10013180	Taiwan Province	Pingtung County	Kanding Township	崁頂鄉		Rural township	15,408	31.27	492.74	17,379	−1,971
10013190	Taiwan Province	Pingtung County	Linbian Township	林邊鄉		Rural township	17,540	15.62	1,122.92	20,854	−3,314
10013200	Taiwan Province	Pingtung County	Nanzhou Township	南州鄉		Rural township	10,494	18.97	553.19	11,700	−1,206
10013210	Taiwan Province	Pingtung County	Jiadong Township	佳冬鄉		Rural township	18,823	30.98	607.59	21,377	−2,554
10013220	Taiwan Province	Pingtung County	Liuqiu Township	琉球鄉		Rural township	12,214	6.80	1,796.18	12,300	−86
10013230	Taiwan Province	Pingtung County	Checheng Township	車城鄉		Rural township	8,381	49.85	168.12	9,625	−1,244
10013240	Taiwan Province	Pingtung County	Manzhou Township	滿州鄉		Rural township	7,668	142.20	53.92	8,453	−785
10013250	Taiwan Province	Pingtung County	Fangshan Township	枋山鄉		Rural township	5,333	17.27	308.80	6,062	−729
10013260	Taiwan Province	Pingtung County	Sandimen Township	三地門鄉		Mountain indigenous township	7,663	196.40	39.02	7,573	+90
10013270	Taiwan Province	Pingtung County	Wutai Township	霧臺鄉		Mountain indigenous township	3,297	278.80	11.83	2,978	+319
10013280	Taiwan Province	Pingtung County	Majia Township	瑪家鄉		Mountain indigenous township	6,786	78.70	86.23	6,544	+242
10013290	Taiwan Province	Pingtung County	Taiwu Township	泰武鄉		Mountain indigenous township	5,411	118.63	45.61	5,099	+312
10013300	Taiwan Province	Pingtung County	Laiyi Township	來義鄉		Mountain indigenous township	7,437	167.78	44.33	7,764	−327
10013310	Taiwan Province	Pingtung County	Chunri Township	春日鄉		Mountain indigenous township	4,942	160.00	30.89	4,821	+121
10013320	Taiwan Province	Pingtung County	Shizi Township	獅子鄉		Mountain indigenous township	4,916	301.00	16.33	4,873	+43
10013330	Taiwan Province	Pingtung County	Mudan Township	牡丹鄉		Mountain indigenous township	4,857	181.84	26.71	4,995	−138
10014010	Taiwan Province	Taitung County	Taitung City	臺東市		County-administered city	105,138	109.77	957.80	108,870	−3,732
10014020	Taiwan Province	Taitung County	Chenggong Township	成功鎮		Urban township	13,729	143.99	95.35	15,810	−2,081
10014030	Taiwan Province	Taitung County	Guanshan Township	關山鎮		Urban township	8,561	58.74	145.74	9,715	−1,154
10014040	Taiwan Province	Taitung County	Beinan Township	卑南鄉		Rural township	17,117	412.69	41.48	18,231	−1,114
10014100	Taiwan Province	Taitung County	Dawu Township	大武鄉		Rural township	5,828	69.15	84.28	7,012	−1,184
10014090	Taiwan Province	Taitung County	Taimali Township	太麻里鄉		Rural township	10,995	96.65	113.76	12,014	−1,019
10014070	Taiwan Province	Taitung County	Donghe Township	東河鄉		Rural township	8,338	210.19	39.67	9,329	−991
10014080	Taiwan Province	Taitung County	Changbin Township	長濱鄉		Rural township	7,008	155.19	45.16	8,291	−1,283
10014050	Taiwan Province	Taitung County	Luye Township	鹿野鄉		Rural township	7,742	89.70	86.31	8,584	−842
10014060	Taiwan Province	Taitung County	Chishang Township	池上鄉		Rural township	8,140	82.69	98.44	9,196	−1,056
10014110	Taiwan Province	Taitung County	Lüdao Township	綠島鄉		Rural township	4,042	15.09	267.86	3,358	+684
10014130	Taiwan Province	Taitung County	Yanping Township	延平鄉		Mountain indigenous township	3,543	455.88	7.77	3,599	−56
10014120	Taiwan Province	Taitung County	Haiduan Township	海端鄉		Mountain indigenous township	4,116	880.04	4.68	4,510	−394
10014150	Taiwan Province	Taitung County	Daren Township	達仁鄉		Mountain indigenous township	3,506	306.45	11.44	4,095	−589
10014140	Taiwan Province	Taitung County	Jinfeng Township	金峰鄉		Mountain indigenous township	3,697	380.66	9.71	3,560	+137
10014160	Taiwan Province	Taitung County	Lanyu Township	蘭嶼鄉		Mountain indigenous township	5,133	48.39	106.08	4,499	+634
10015010	Taiwan Province	Hualien County	Hualien City	花蓮市		County-administered city	103,324	29.41	3,513.23	109,251	−5,927
10015020	Taiwan Province	Hualien County	Fenglin Township	鳳林鎮		Urban township	10,816	120.52	89.74	11,957	−1,141
10015030	Taiwan Province	Hualien County	Yuli Township	玉里鎮		Urban township	23,609	252.37	93.55	26,879	−3,270
10015040	Taiwan Province	Hualien County	Xincheng Township	新城鄉		Rural township	20,110	29.41	683.78	20,206	−96
10015050	Taiwan Province	Hualien County	Ji'an Township	吉安鄉		Rural township	83,576	65.26	1,280.66	79,688	+3,888
10015060	Taiwan Province	Hualien County	Shoufeng Township	壽豐鄉		Rural township	17,790	218.44	81.44	18,660	−870
10015070	Taiwan Province	Hualien County	Guangfu Township	光復鄉		Rural township	12,528	157.11	79.74	14,120	−1,592
10015080	Taiwan Province	Hualien County	Fengbin Township	豐濱鄉		Rural township	4,465	162.43	27.49	5,065	−600
10015090	Taiwan Province	Hualien County	Ruisui Township	瑞穗鄉		Rural township	11,417	135.59	84.20	12,863	−1,446
10015100	Taiwan Province	Hualien County	Fuli Township	富里鄉		Rural township	10,151	176.37	57.56	11,667	−1,516
10015110	Taiwan Province	Hualien County	Xiulin Township	秀林鄉		Mountain indigenous township	15,932	1,641.86	9.70	15,244	+688
10015120	Taiwan Province	Hualien County	Wanrong Township	萬榮鄉		Mountain indigenous township	6,308	618.49	10.20	6,856	−548
10015130	Taiwan Province	Hualien County	Zhuoxi Township	卓溪鄉		Mountain indigenous township	6,037	1,021.31	5.91	6,349	−312
10016010	Taiwan Province	Penghu County	Magong City	馬公市		County-administered city	62,941	33.99	1,851.75	57,061	+5,880
10016020	Taiwan Province	Penghu County	Huxi Township	湖西鄉		Rural township	14,994	33.30	450.27	13,660	+1,334
10016030	Taiwan Province	Penghu County	Baisha Township	白沙鄉		Rural township	9,837	20.09	489.65	9,471	+366
10016040	Taiwan Province	Penghu County	Xiyu Township	西嶼鄉		Rural township	8,316	18.71	444.47	8,437	−121
10016050	Taiwan Province	Penghu County	Wangan Township	望安鄉		Rural township	5,258	13.78	381.57	4,747	+511
10016060	Taiwan Province	Penghu County	Cimei Township	七美鄉		Rural township	3,801	6.99	543.78	3,542	+259
10017010	Taiwan Province	Keelung City	Zhongzheng District	中正區		District	51,484	10.21	5,042.51	55,271	−3,787
10017020	Taiwan Province	Keelung City	Qidu District	七堵區		District	53,737	56.27	954.98	55,161	−1,424
10017030	Taiwan Province	Keelung City	Nuannuan District	暖暖區		District	38,550	22.83	1,688.57	37,958	+592
10017040	Taiwan Province	Keelung City	Ren'ai District	仁愛區		District	43,229	4.23	10,219.62	49,581	−6,352
10017050	Taiwan Province	Keelung City	Zhongshan District	中山區		District	46,840	10.52	4,452.47	50,909	−4,069
10017060	Taiwan Province	Keelung City	Anle District	安樂區		District	82,336	18.03	4,566.61	84,017	−1,681
10017070	Taiwan Province	Keelung City	Xinyi District	信義區		District	52,756	10.67	4,944.33	51,237	+1,519
10018010	Taiwan Province	Hsinchu City	East District	東區		District	218,054	33.58	6,493.57	197,254	+20,800
10018020	Taiwan Province	Hsinchu City	North District	北區		District	152,400	15.73	9,688.49	145,441	+6,959
10018030	Taiwan Province	Hsinchu City	Xiangshan District	香山區		District	78,659	54.85	1,434.07	72,649	+6,010
10020010	Taiwan Province	Chiayi City	East District	東區		District	120,788	30.16	4,004.91	125,297	−4,509
10020020	Taiwan Province	Chiayi City	West District	西區		District	146,865	29.87	4,916.81	147,093	−228
09020010	Fuchien Province	Kinmen County	Jincheng Township	金城鎮		Urban township	43,275	21.71	1,993.32	32,315	+10,960
09020030	Fuchien Province	Kinmen County	Jinhu Township	金湖鎮		Urban township	30,186	41.70	723.88	21,328	+8,858
09020020	Fuchien Province	Kinmen County	Jinsha Township	金沙鎮		Urban township	20,819	41.19	505.44	15,324	+5,495
09020040	Fuchien Province	Kinmen County	Jinning Township	金寧鄉		Rural township	32,530	29.85	1,089.78	18,938	+13,592
09020050	Fuchien Province	Kinmen County	Lieyu Township	烈嶼鄉		Rural township	12,766	16.00	797.88	8,921	+3,845
09020060	Fuchien Province	Kinmen County	Wuqiu Township	烏坵鄉		Rural township	677	1.20	564.17	538	+139
09007010	Fuchien Province	Lienchiang County	Nangan Township	南竿鄉		Rural township	7,597	10.40	730.48	5,904	+1,693
09007020	Fuchien Province	Lienchiang County	Beigan Township	北竿鄉		Rural township	2,594	9.90	262.02	1,801	+793
09007030	Fuchien Province	Lienchiang County	Juguang Township	莒光鄉		Rural township	1,538	4.70	327.23	1,186	+352
09007040	Fuchien Province	Lienchiang County	Dongyin Township	東引鄉		Rural township	1,351	3.80	355.53	1,053	+298

== See also ==
- List of administrative divisions of Taiwan
- List of administrative divisions of Fujian
