= Legislative Yuan constituencies in Pingtung County =

Pingtung County
- 2 Single-member constituency for the Legislative Yuan
- District(s): Pingtung County
- Electorate: 689,393

Current constituency
- Created: 2008
- Number of members: 2

Pingtung County legislative districts (Chinese: 屏東縣選舉區) consist of 2 single-member constituencies, each represented by a member of the Republic of China Legislative Yuan. From the 2020 legislative election onwards, the number of Pingtung's seats was decreased from 3 to 2. The redistricting split the original Pingtung Constituency 2 among the two remaining constituencies.

== Current districts ==
- Pingtung County Constituency 1 - Ligang, Gaoshu, Sandimen, Wutai, Jiuru, Yanpu, Changzhi, Neipu, Majia, Linluo Townships, Pingtung City
- Pingtung County Constituency 2 - Wandan, Taiwu, Zhutian, Wanluan, Chaozhou, Xinyuan, Kanding, Nanzhou, Xinpi, Laiyi, Donggang, Linbian, Jiadong, Fangliao, Chunri, Fangshan, Shizi, Mudan, Checheng, Manzhou, Hengchun, Liuqiu Townships
Pingtung County Constituency 1

Pingtung County Constituency 2

== Historical districts ==
=== 2008-2020 ===
- Pingtung County Constituency 1 - Ligang, Gaoshu, Sandimen, Wutai, Jiuru, Yanpu, Changzhi, Neipu, Majia, Taiwu, Zhutian, Wanluan, Chaozhou Townships
- Pingtung County Constituency 2 - Pingtung City, Linluo, Wandan Townships
- Pingtung County Constituency 3 - Xinyuan, Kanding, Nanzhou, Xinpi, Laiyi, Donggang, Linbian, Jiadong, Fangliao, Chunri, Fangshan, Shizi, Mudan, Checheng, Manzhou, Hengchun, Liuqiu Townships

== Legislators ==
Kuomintang Democratic Progressive Party Independent

Election	Pingtung County 1	Pingtung County 2	Pingtung County 3
2008 7th	Su Chen-ching	Wang Chin-shih	Pan Men-an (2012-2014)^{1}
2012 8th	Su Chen-ching	Wang Chin-shih	Pan Men-an (2012-2014)^{1}
2015 by-election	Su Chen-ching	Wang Chin-shih	Chuang Jui-hsiung
2016 9th	Su Chen-ching	Chung Chia-pin	Chuang Jui-hsiung
Election	Pingtung County 1	Pingtung County 2	
2020 10th	Chung Chia-pin	Su Chen-ching^{2}	
2024 11th	Chung Chia-pin	Hsu Fu-kuei	

Pan Men-an resigned in 2014 after elected Pingtung County magistrate.

Su Chen-ching is a member of DPP but ran as an independent.
