= Takao Prefecture =

Prefecture of Taiwan under Japanese rule

Takao Prefecture 高雄州
- たかおしゅう Takaoshū
- 1920–1952
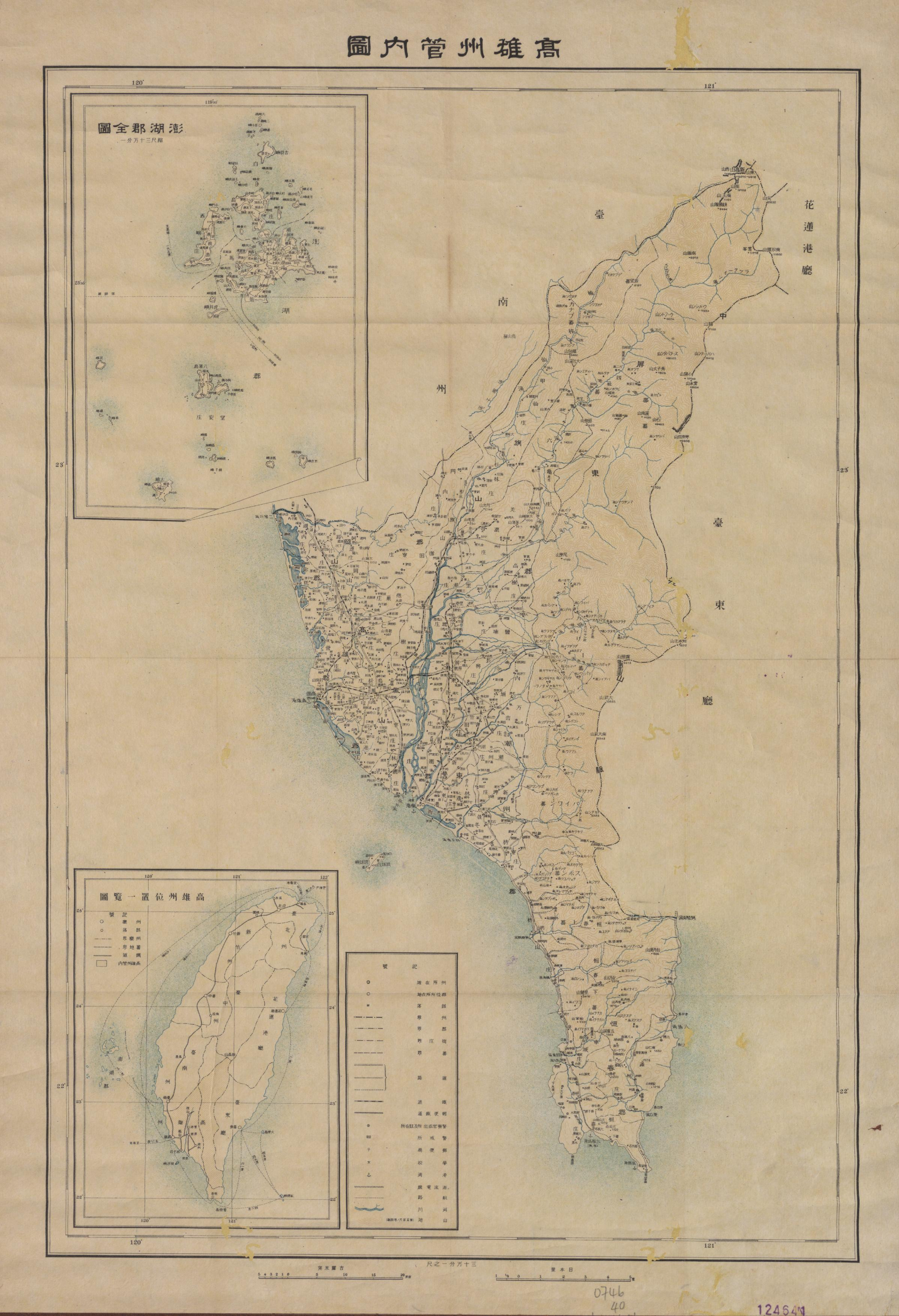
- A pre-1924 map of Takao Prefecture
- Capital: Takao City
- Area
  - 1941: 5,721.8674 km^{2} (2,209.2254 sq mi)
- Population
  - 1941: 930,383
- Historical era: Taiwan under Japanese rule
  - Established: September 1920
  - Takao upgraded to city: 1924
  - Pescadores transferred to Hōko Prefecture: 1926
  - Heitō upgraded to city: 1933
  - Placed under Chinese administration: 25 October 1945
  - Relinquished by Japan: 28 April 1952
- Political subdivisions: 2 cities (市); 7 districts (郡)
Succeeded by
Kaohsiung County; Pingtung County
- Today part of: Kaohsiung, Pingtung County

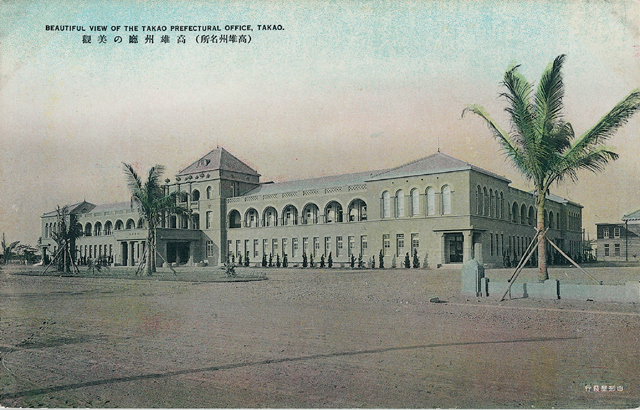
Takao Prefecture government office

Takao Prefecture (高雄州, Takao-shū) was one of the administrative divisions of Taiwan during the Japanese rule. The prefecture consisted of modern-day Kaohsiung City and Pingtung County.

== Population ==
Administrative divisions of Takao Prefecture (1945).

Total population	930,383
Japanese	59,633
Taiwanese	863,313
Korean	598
1941 (Showa 16) census.

== Administrative divisions ==
=== Cities and districts ===
In 1945 (Shōwa 20), there were 2 cities and 7 districts.

Cities (市 shi)			Districts (郡 gun)		
Name	Kanji	Kana	Name	Kanji	Kana
Takao City	高雄市	たかおし	Okayama District	岡山郡	おかやまぐん
Takao City	高雄市	たかおし	Hōzan District	鳳山郡	ほうざんぐん
Takao City	高雄市	たかおし	Kizan District	旗山郡	きざんぐん
Heitō City	屏東市	へいとうし	Heitō District	屏東郡	へいとうぐん
Heitō City	屏東市	へいとうし	Chōshū District	潮州郡	ちょうしゅうぐん
Heitō City	屏東市	へいとうし	Tōkō District	東港郡	とうこうぐん
Heitō City	屏東市	へいとうし	Kōshun District	恒春郡	こうしゅんぐん

=== Towns and villages ===
The districts were divided into towns (街) and villages (庄).

District	Name	Kanji	Notes
Okayama 岡山郡	Okayama town	岡山街	Today Gangshan District and Ciaotou District
Okayama 岡山郡	Ensō village	燕巣庄	Today Yanchao District
Okayama 岡山郡	Denryō village	田寮庄	Today Tianliao District
Okayama 岡山郡	Aren village	阿蓮庄	Today Alian District
Okayama 岡山郡	Rochiku village	路竹庄	Today Lujhu District
Okayama 岡山郡	Konai village	湖内庄	Today Hunei District, Qieding District
Okayama 岡山郡	Mida village	彌陀庄	Today Mituo District, Yong'an District and Ziguan District
Okayama 岡山郡	Nanshi village	楠梓庄	Abolished in 1944, annexed into Takao City, Okayama town and Ensō village
Okayama 岡山郡	Saei village	左營庄	Abolished in 1940, annexed into Takao City
Hōzan 鳳山郡	Hōzan town	鳳山街	Today Fongshan District
Hōzan 鳳山郡	Kominato village	小港庄	Today Siaogang District
Hōzan 鳳山郡	Rinen village	林園庄	Today Linyuan District
Hōzan 鳳山郡	Dairyō village	大寮庄	Today Daliao District
Hōzan 鳳山郡	Daiju village	大樹庄	Today Dashu District
Hōzan 鳳山郡	Jinbu village	仁武庄	Today Dashe District and Renwu District
Hōzan 鳳山郡	Torimatsu village	鳥松庄	Today Niaosong District
Kizan 旗山郡	Kizan town	旗山街	Today Cishan District
Kizan 旗山郡	Mino town	美濃街	Today Meinong District
Kizan 旗山郡	Rokuki village	六龜庄	Today Liouguei District
Kizan 旗山郡	Sanrin village	杉林庄	Today Shanlin District
Kizan 旗山郡	Kōsen village	甲仙庄	Today Jiasian District
Kizan 旗山郡	Naimon village	內門庄	Today Neimen District
Kizan 旗山郡	Aboriginal Area	蕃地	Today Maolin District, Namasia District and Tauyuan District
Heitō 屏東郡	Chōkō village	長興庄	Today Changzhi Township and Linluo Township
Heitō 屏東郡	Enho village	鹽埔庄	Today Yanpu Township
Heitō 屏東郡	Takagi village	高樹庄	Today Gaoshu Township
Heitō 屏東郡	Rikō village	里港庄	Today Ligang Township
Heitō 屏東郡	Kyūkai village	九塊庄	Today Jiuru Township
Heitō 屏東郡	Aboriginal Area	蕃地	Today Majia Township, Sandimen Township and Wutai Township
Heitō 屏東郡	Heitō town	屏東街	Upgraded to a city in 1933. Today Pingtung City
Heitō 屏東郡	Rokuki village	六龜庄	Annexed into Kizan district in 1932
Chōshū 潮州郡	Chōshū town	潮州街	Today Chaozhou Township
Chōshū 潮州郡	Manran village	萬巒庄	Today Wanluan Township
Chōshū 潮州郡	Naiho village	內埔庄	Today Neipu Township
Chōshū 潮州郡	Takeda village	竹田庄	Today Zhutian Township
Chōshū 潮州郡	Shinhi village	新埤庄	Today Xinpi Township
Chōshū 潮州郡	Hōryō village	枋寮庄	Today Fangliao Township
Chōshū 潮州郡	Hōzan village	枋山庄	Today Fangshan Township
Chōshū 潮州郡	Aboriginal Area	蕃地	Today Chunri Township, Laiyi Township, Shizi Township and Taiwu Township
Tōkō 東港郡	Tōkō town	東港街	Today Donggang Township
Tōkō 東港郡	Shin'en town	新園庄	Today Xinyuan Township and Kanding Township
Tōkō 東港郡	Mantan village	萬丹庄	Today Wandan Township
Tōkō 東港郡	Rinhen village	林邊庄	Today Linbian Township and Nanzhou Township
Tōkō 東港郡	Katō village	佳冬庄	Today Jiadong Township
Tōkō 東港郡	Ryūkyū village	琉球庄	Lamay Island, today Liuqiu Township
Kōshun 恒春郡	Kōshun town	恒春街	Today Hengchun Township
Kōshun 恒春郡	Shajō village	車城庄	Today Checheng Township
Kōshun 恒春郡	Manshū village	滿州庄	Today Manzhou Township
Kōshun 恒春郡	Aboriginal Area	蕃地	Today Mudan Township
Takao 高雄郡 (Abolished in 1924)	Takao town	高雄街	Upgraded to a city in 1924
Takao 高雄郡 (Abolished in 1924)	Ensō village	燕巣庄	Annexed into Okayama district in 1924
Takao 高雄郡 (Abolished in 1924)	Saei village	左營庄	Annexed into Okayama district in 1924
Takao 高雄郡 (Abolished in 1924)	Nanshi village	楠梓庄	Annexed into Okayama district in 1924
Takao 高雄郡 (Abolished in 1924)	Jinbu village	仁武庄	Annexed into Hōzan district in 1924

== See also ==
- Political divisions of Taiwan (1895-1945)
- Governor-General of Taiwan
- Taiwan under Japanese rule
- Administrative divisions of the Republic of China
