= Pingtung County Constituency 2 =

Constituency of the Legislative Yuan of Taiwan

- Single-member constituency for the Legislative Yuan
- District(s): Wandan, Taiwu, Zhutian, Wanluan, Chaozhou, Xinyuan, Kanding, Nanzhou, Xinpi, Laiyi, Donggang, Linbian, Jiadong, Fangliao, Chunri, Fangshan, Shizi, Mudan, Checheng, Manzhou, Hengchun, Liuqiu
- Electorate: 312,045 (2024 election)

Current constituency
- Created: 2020
- Party: DPP
- Member: Hsu Fu-kuei
- Created from: Pingtung County Constituency 3 (2008-2020); Pingtung County Constituency 1 (2008-2020) - 4 villages Pintung County Constituency 2 (2008-2020) - Wandan only

Pingtung County Constituency 2 (Chinese: 屏東縣第二選舉區) is one of the 73 regional constituencies represented in the Legislative Yuan, the national legislature of Taiwan. It was created in 2020 following boundary changes across Taiwan, and elects one legislator, through first-past-the-post voting, to the Legislative Yuan. It has been represented by Hsu Fu-kuei of the Democratic Progressive Party since 2024.

== Legislators ==
Election	Legislator	Party
2020 - 2024	Su Chen-ching	Independent
2020	Hsu Fu-kuei	Democratic Progressive Party

== Election results ==

=== 2020 ===
2020 Taiwanese legislative election: Pingtung 2
Candidate	Party	Votes	%
Su Chen-ching	Independent (Note: Su was suspended by the DPP after being indicted for corruption)	107,956	46.98
Chou Chia-chi	Kuomintang	91,168	39.67
Chiang I	Independent	19,209	8.36
Chen Tsao-min	Independent	7,214	3.14
Ho Chiu-chi	Taiwan Labor Party (Note: Not affiliated with Labor Party)	1,102	0.48
Yao Tsing-han	Independent	957	0.42
Cheng Wen-lung	Congress Party Alliance	887	0.39
Feng Chia-yun	Sovereign State for Formosa & Pescadores Party	682	0.30
Ho Li-li	Chinese Unification Promotion Party	631	0.27
Total		229,806	100.00
Valid votes		229,806	97.59
Invalid/blank votes		5,685	2.41
Total votes		235,491	100.00
Registered voters/turnout		317,010	74.29
Majority		16,788	7.31
Independent win (new seat)			

=== 2024 ===
2024 Taiwanese legislative election: Pingtung 2
Candidate	Party	Votes	%	+/–
Hsu Fu-kuei	Democratic Progressive Party	108,923	53.38	NEW
Su Meng-chun	Independent (Note: Kuomintang-affiliated)	82,147	40.26	NEW
Ho Chiu-chi	The People Union Party	8,845	4.33	NEW
Wu Mei-kung	Chinese United Party	4,139	2.03	NEW
Total		204,054	100.00	–
Valid votes		204,054	94.54	
Invalid/blank votes		11,796	5.46	
Total votes		215,850	100.00	
Registered voters/turnout		312,045	69.17	
Majority		26,776	13.12	
Democratic Progressive Party gain from Independent				
