= Laiyi =

Laiyi can refer to:

- Laiyi, Pingtung, Taiwan
- An ethnic group of Dongyi, China
