= Chunri =

Chunri can refer to:

- Chunri, Pingtung, a township in Taiwan
- Chunri, an alternative name for the dupatta, a long scarf worn by South Asian women
- Chunri (TV series), a Pakistani television drama
