= List of administrative divisions of Taiwan =

The following is a list of administrative divisions of the Republic of China (Taiwan), including six special municipalities and two nominal provinces (Note: The provinces remain as titular divisions under the constitutional structure only, which are no longer considered as self-governing bodies after the suspension of provinces in 1998 following a constitutional amendment, and a complete abolishment of provincial governments took effect in 2018.) as the de jure first-level administrative divisions. Eleven counties and three cities were nominally under the jurisdiction of the Taiwan Province, and two additional counties were part of Fuchien Province.

With provinces non-functional in practice, Taiwan is divided into 22 subnational divisions, among which counties and cities are the de facto principal constituent divisions, along with special municipalities, directly under the Central Government. Each has a local government led by an elected head and a local council.

== List ==
ISO	HRCIS	Flag	English name	Chinese name	Type	Population 2020 (Note: March 2020)	Area (km^{2})	Population density (per km^{2})	Population 2010 (Note: December 2010)	Population change (Note: March 2020−December 2010)	Subdivision count	Capital
Special Municipalities
NWT	65000		New Taipei City	新北市	Special municipality	4,023,620	2,052.57	1,960.29	3,897,367	▲126,253	29	Banqiao District
TPE	63000		Taipei City	臺北市	Special municipality	2,635,286	271.80	9,695.69	2,618,772	▲16,514	12	Xinyi District
TAO	68000		Taoyuan City	桃園市	Special municipality	2,254,363	1,220.95	1,846.39	2,002,060	▲252,303	13	Taoyuan District
TXG	66000		Taichung City	臺中市	Special municipality	2,816,667	2,214.90	1,271.69	2,648,419	▲168,248	29	Xitun District
TNN	67000		Tainan City	臺南市	Special municipality	1,879,115	2,191.65	857.40	1,873,794	▲5,321	37	Anping District, Sinying District
KHH	64000		Kaohsiung City	高雄市	Special municipality	2,773,984	2,951.85	939.74	2,773,483	▲501	38	Lingya District, Fongshan District
Taiwan Province (nominal)
ILA	10002		Yilan County	宜蘭縣	County	453,951	2,143.63	211.77	460,486	▼6,535	12	Yilan City
HSQ	10004		Hsinchu County	新竹縣	County	565,272	1,427.54	395.98	513,015	▲52,257	13	Zhubei City
MIA	10005		Miaoli County	苗栗縣	County	544,762	1,820.31	299.27	560,968	▼16,206	18	Miaoli City
CHA	10007		Changhua County	彰化縣	County	1,271,015	1,074.40	1,183.00	1,307,286	▼36,271	26	Changhua City
NAN	10008		Nantou County	南投縣	County	493,403	4,106.44	120.15	526,491	▼33,088	13	Nantou City
YUN	10009		Yunlin County	雲林縣	County	680,050	1,290.83	526.83	717,653	▼37,603	20	Douliu City
CYQ	10010		Chiayi County	嘉義縣	County	502,007	1,903.64	263.71	543,248	▼41,241	18	Taibao City
PIF	10013		Pingtung County	屏東縣	County	817,193	2,775.60	294.42	873,509	▼56,316	33	Pingtung City
TTT	10014		Taitung County	臺東縣	County	216,308	3,515.25	61.53	230,673	▼14,365	16	Taitung City
HUA	10015		Hualien County	花蓮縣	County	325,706	4,628.57	70.37	338,805	▼13,099	13	Hualien City
PEN	10016		Penghu County	澎湖縣	County	105,117	126.86	828.58	96,918	▲8,199	6	Magong City
KEE	10017		Keelung City	基隆市	City	371,878	60.03	4,455.97	384,134	▼12,256	7	Anle District
HSZ	10018		Hsinchu City	新竹市	City	448,207	151.66	922.82	415,344	▲32,863	3	East District
CYI	10020		Chiayi City	嘉義市	City	270,254	28.80	452.57	272,390	▼2,136	2	West District
Fujian Province (nominal)
KIN	09020		Kinmen County	金門縣	County	127,723	132.76	2,777.91	97,364	▲30,359	6	Jincheng Township
LIE	09007		Lienchiang County	連江縣	County	12,716	104.15	4,315.06	9,944	▲2,772	4	Nangan Township

== See also ==
- List of magistrates and mayors in Taiwan
- List of townships/cities and districts in Taiwan
