= Township (Taiwan) =

Third level administrative subdivisions in the Republic of China

Townships are the third-level administrative subdivisions of counties of the Republic of China (Taiwan), along with county-administered cities. After World War II, the townships were established from the following conversions on the Japanese administrative divisions:

Divisions before 1945				Divisions after 1945			
Name	Kanji	Japanese Hepburn	Taiwanese Pe̍h-ōe-jī	Name	Chinese	Mandarin Pinyin	Taiwanese Pe̍h-ōe-jī
Town	街	gai	ke	Urban township	鎮	zhèn	tìn
Village	庄	jō	chng	Rural township	鄉	xiāng	hiong
Aboriginal areas	蕃地	banchi	hoan-tē	Mountain indigenous township	山地鄉	shāndì xiāng	soaⁿ-tē hiong

Although local laws do not enforce strict standards for classifying them, generally urban townships have a larger population and more business and industry than rural townships, but not to the extent of county-administered cities. Under townships, there is also the village as the base/fourth level of administration.

As of 2022, there are in all 184 townships, including 38 urban townships, 122 rural townships and 24 mountain indigenous townships. 174 townships with 35 urban and 115 rural townships are located in Taiwan Province and 10 townships with 3 urban and 7 rural townships are located in Fujian Province. Penghu and Lienchiang are the only two counties that do not have urban townships.

Rural townships Mountain indigenous township Urban townships County-administered cities Mountain indigenous districts of municipalities Provincial cities Special municipalities

== Statistics of townships ==
=== Taiwan Province ===
County Name	Subdivisions		Types of Townships		
County Name	Cities	Townships	Urban	Rural	Mountain Indigenous
Changhua	2	24	6	18	0
Chiayi	2	16	2	13	1
Hsinchu	1	12	3	7	2
Hualien	1	12	2	7	3
Yilan	1	11	3	6	2
Miaoli	2	16	5	10	1
Nantou	1	12	4	6	2
Penghu	1	5	0	5	0
Pingtung	1	32	3	21	8
Taitung	1	15	2	8	5
Yunlin	1	19	5	14	0
Total	14	174	35	115	24

=== Fujian Province ===
County Name	Subdivisions		Types of Townships		
County Name	Cities	Townships	Urban	Rural	Mountain Indigenous
Kinmen	0	6	3	3	0
Lienchiang	0	4	0	4	0
Total	0	10	3	7	0

== List of townships by county ==
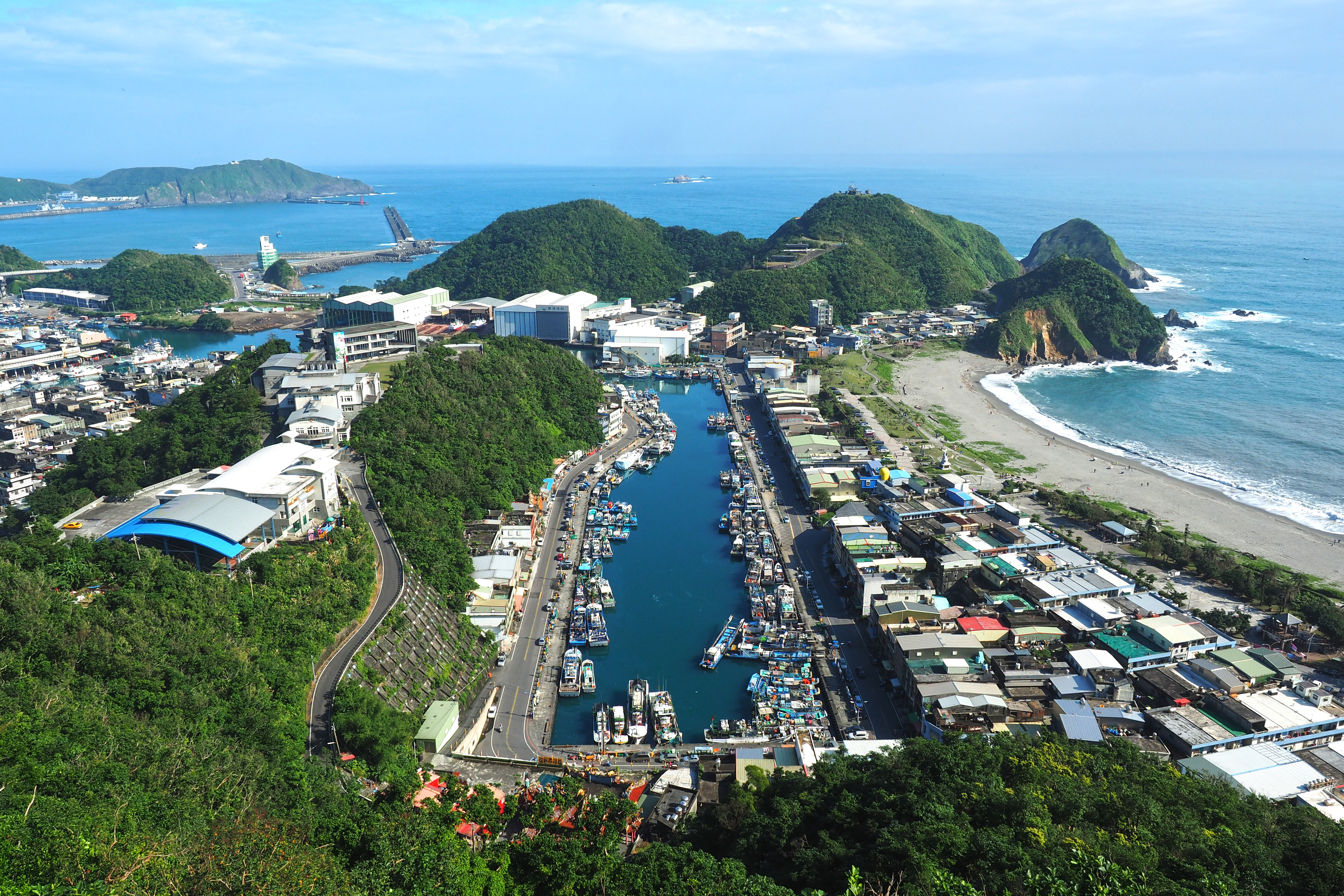
Su'ao, an urban township in Yilan County.

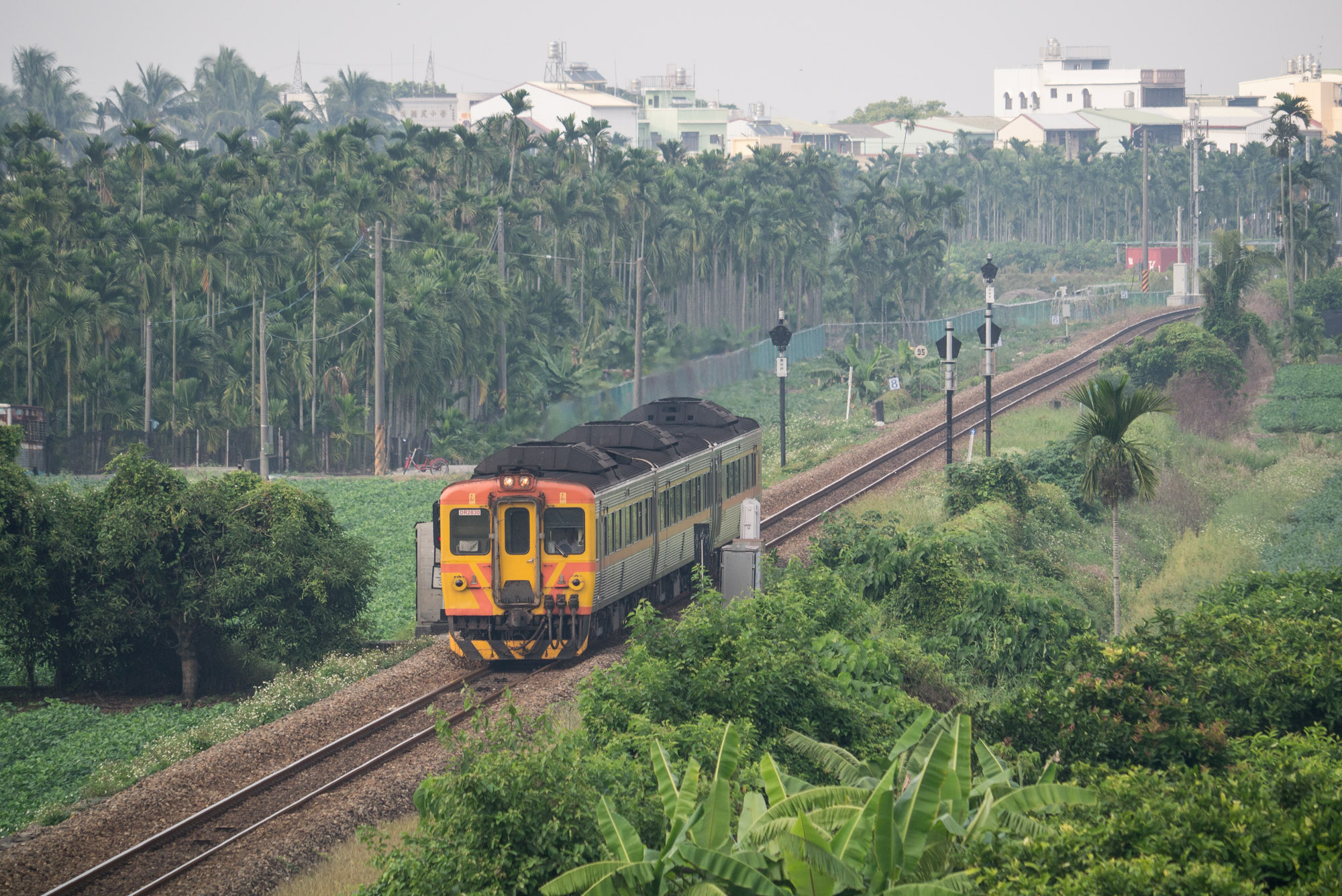
Kanding, a rural township in Pingtung County.

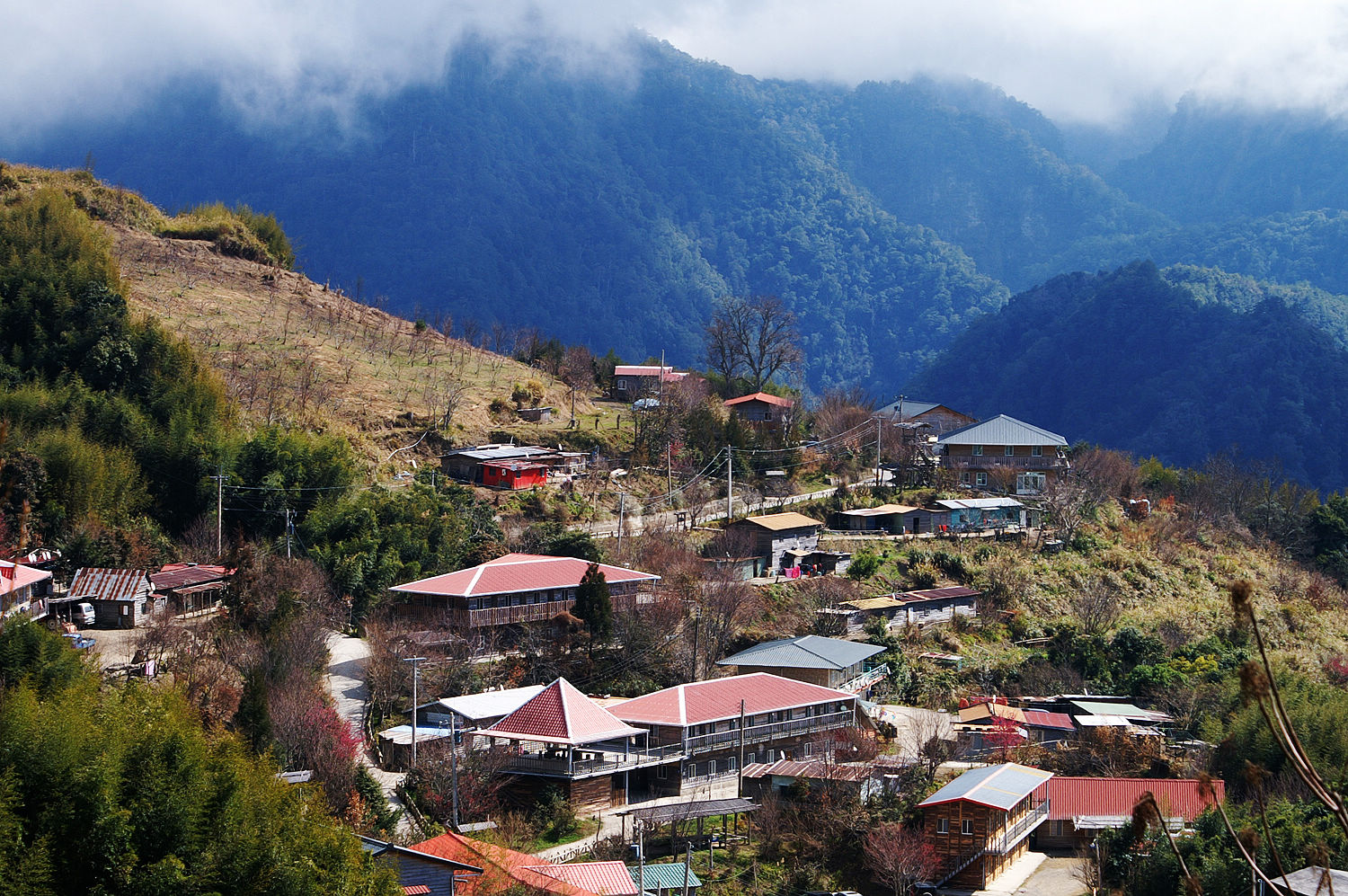
Jianshi, a mountain indigenous township in Hsinchu County.

Township names are now transliterated using the Hanyu Pinyin romanization system without tone marks. The county names do not necessarily use Hanyu Pinyin or special case such as Lukang.

Colors indicate the common language status of Formosan languages, Hakka or Matsu dialect within each division.

Name	Chinese	Hànyǔ Pīnyīn	Taiwanese Pe̍h-ōe-jī	Hakka Pha̍k-fa-sṳ	Formosan or others	County	Type
Luodong	羅東鎮	Luódōng	Lô-tong	Lò-tûng	Rutung^{Kavalan}	Yilan	Urban
Su'ao	蘇澳鎮	Sū'ào	So·-Ò	Sû-o		Yilan	Urban
Toucheng	頭城鎮	Tóuchéng	Thâu-siâⁿ	Thèu-sàng		Yilan	Urban
Jiaoxi	礁溪鄉	Jiāoxī	Ta-khe	Chiâu-hâi		Yilan	Rural
Zhuangwei	壯圍鄉	Zhuàngwéi	Chòng-ûi	Chong-vì		Yilan	Rural
Yuanshan	員山鄉	Yuánshān	Îⁿ-soaⁿ	Yèn-sân		Yilan	Rural
Dongshan	冬山鄉	Dōngshān	Tang-soaⁿ	Tûng-sân		Yilan	Rural
Wujie	五結鄉	Wǔjié	Gō·-kiat	Ńg-kiet		Yilan	Rural
Sanxing	三星鄉	Sānxīng	Saⁿ-chheⁿ/chhiⁿ	Sâm-sên		Yilan	Rural
Datong	大同鄉	Dàtóng	Tāi-tông	Thai-thùng	Minnao^{Atayal}	Yilan	Mountain indigenous
Nan'ao	南澳鄉	Nán'ào	Lâm-ò	Nàm-o	Kbbu'^{Atayal}	Yilan	Mountain indigenous
Guanxi	關西鎮	Guānxi	Koan-se	Kûan-sî	^{Atayal}	Hsinchu	Urban
Xinpu	新埔鎮	Xīnpǔ	Sin-po͘	Sîn-phû		Hsinchu	Urban
Zhudong	竹東鎮	Zhúdōng	Tek-tang	Chuk-tûng		Hsinchu	Urban
Hukou	湖口鄉	Húkǒu	Ô͘-kháu	Fù-khiéu		Hsinchu	Rural
Hengshan	橫山鄉	Héngshān	Hoâiⁿ-san	Vàng-sân		Hsinchu	Rural
Xinfeng	新豐鄉	Xīnfēng	Sin-hong	Sîn-fûng		Hsinchu	Rural
Qionglin	芎林鄉	Qiōnglín	Khiông-nâ	Khiûng-lìm		Hsinchu	Rural
Baoshan	寶山鄉	Bǎoshān	Pó-san	Pó-sân		Hsinchu	Rural
Beipu	北埔鄉	Běipǔ	Pak-po͘	Pet-phû		Hsinchu	Rural
Emei	峨眉鄉	Éméi	Gô-bî	Ngô-mì		Hsinchu	Rural
Jianshi	尖石鄉	Jiānshí	Chiam-chio̍h	Chiâm-sa̍k	Nahuy^{Atayal}	Hsinchu	Mountain indigenous
Wufeng	五峰鄉	Wǔfēng	Ngó͘-hong	Ńg-fûng	Tatoba'^{Atayal, Saisiyat}	Hsinchu	Mountain indigenous
Yuanli	苑裡鎮	Yuànlǐ	Oán-lí	Yen-lî		Miaoli	Urban
Tongxiao	通霄鎮	Tōngxiāo	Thong-siau	Thûng-sêu		Miaoli	Urban
Zhunan	竹南鎮	Zhúnán	Tek-lâm	Chuk-nàm		Miaoli	Urban
Houlong	後龍鎮	Hòulóng	Āu-lâng	Heu-liùng		Miaoli	Urban
Zhuolan	卓蘭鎮	Zhuólán	Tah-lân	Cho̍k-làn		Miaoli	Urban
Dahu	大湖鄉	Dàhú	Tōa-ô͘	Thai-fù		Miaoli	Rural
Gongguan	公館鄉	Gōngguǎn	Kong-koán	Kûng-kón		Miaoli	Rural
Tongluo	銅鑼鄉	Tóngluó	Tâng-lô	Thùng-lò		Miaoli	Rural
Nanzhuang	南庄鄉	Nánzhuāng	Lâm-chng	Nàm-chông		Miaoli	Rural
Touwu	頭屋鄉	Tóuwū	Thâu-ok	Thèu-vuk		Miaoli	Rural
Sanyi	三義鄉	Sānyì	Sam-gī	Sâm-ngi		Miaoli	Rural
Xihu	西湖鄉	Xīhú	Se-ô͘	Sî-fù		Miaoli	Rural
Zaoqiao	造橋鄉	Zàoqiáo	Chō-kiô	Cho-khièu		Miaoli	Rural
Sanwan	三灣鄉	Sānwān	Sam-oan	Sâm-vân		Miaoli	Rural
Shitan	獅潭鄉	Shītán	Sai-thâm	Sṳ̂-thàn		Miaoli	Rural
Tai'an	泰安鄉	Tài'ān	Thài-an	Thai-ôn	Taian^{Atayal}	Miaoli	Mountain indigenous
Lukang	鹿港鎮	Lùgǎng	Lo̍k-káng	Lu̍k-kóng		Changhua	Urban
Hemei	和美鎮	Héměi	Hô-bí	Fò-mî		Changhua	Urban
Beidou	北斗鎮	Běidǒu	Pó-táu	Pet-téu		Changhua	Urban
Xihu	溪湖鎮	Xīhú	Khe-ô͘	Hâi-fù		Changhua	Urban
Tianzhong	田中鎮	Tiánzhōng	Tiân-tiong	Thièn-chûng		Changhua	Urban
Erlin	二林鎮	Èrlín	Jī-lîm	Ngi-lìm		Changhua	Urban
Xianxi	線西鄉	Xiànxi	Soàⁿ-sai	Sien-sî		Changhua	Rural
Shengang	伸港鄉	Shēngǎng	Sin-káng	Chhûn-kóng		Changhua	Rural
Fuxing	福興鄉	Fúxīng	Hok-heng	Fuk-hîn		Changhua	Rural
Xiushui	秀水鄉	Xiùshuǐ	Siù-chúi	Siu-súi		Changhua	Rural
Huatan	花壇鄉	Huātán	Hoe-toâⁿ	Fâ-thàn		Changhua	Rural
Fenyuan	芬園鄉	Fēnyuán	Hun-hn̂g	Fûn-yèn		Changhua	Rural
Dacun	大村鄉	Dàcūn	Tāi-chhoan	Thai-chhûn		Changhua	Rural
Puyan	埔鹽鄉	Pǔyán	Po͘-iâm	Phû-yàm		Changhua	Rural
Puxin	埔心鄉	Pǔxīn	Po͘-sim	Phû-sîm		Changhua	Rural
Yongjing	永靖鄉	Yǒngjìng	Éng-chēng	Yún-chhìn		Changhua	Rural
Shetou	社頭鄉	Shètóu	Siā-thâu	Sa-thèu		Changhua	Rural
Ershui	二水鄉	Èrshuǐ	Jī-chúi	Ngi-súi		Changhua	Rural
Tianwei	田尾鄉	Tiánwěi	Chhân-boé	Thièn-mî		Changhua	Rural
Pitou	埤頭鄉	Pítóu	Pi-thâu	Phî-thèu		Changhua	Rural
Fangyuan	芳苑鄉	Fāngyuàn	Hong-oán	Fông-yen		Changhua	Rural
Dacheng	大城鄉	Dàchéng	Toā-siâⁿ	Thai-sàng		Changhua	Rural
Zhutang	竹塘鄉	Zhútáng	Tek-tn̂g	Chuk-thòng		Changhua	Rural
Xizhou	溪州鄉	Xīzhōu	Khe-chiu	Hâi-chû		Changhua	Rural
Puli	埔里鎮	Pǔlǐ	Po͘-lí	Phû-lî		Nantou	Urban
Caotun	草屯鎮	Cǎotún	Chháu-tūn	Chhó-thùn		Nantou	Urban
Zhushan	竹山鎮	Zhúshān	Tek-san	Chuk-sân		Nantou	Urban
Jiji	集集鎮	Jíjí	Chi̍p-chi̍p	Si̍p-si̍p		Nantou	Urban
Mingjian	名間鄉	Míngjiān	Bêng-kan	Miàng-kiên		Nantou	Rural
Lugu	鹿谷鄉	Lùgǔ	Lo̍k-kok	Lu̍k-kuk		Nantou	Rural
Zhongliao	中寮鄉	Zhōngliáo	Tiong-liâu	Chûng-liàu		Nantou	Rural
Yuchi	魚池鄉	Yúchí	Hî-tî	Ǹg-chhṳ̀	Qabizay^{Thao}	Nantou	Rural
Guoxing	國姓鄉	Guóxìng	Kok-sèng	Koet-siang		Nantou	Rural
Shuili	水里鄉	Shuǐlǐ	Chúi-lí	Súi-lî		Nantou	Rural
Xinyi	信義鄉	Xìnyì	Sìn-gī	Sin-ngi	Nehunpu-siang^{Bunun}	Nantou	Mountain indigenous
Ren'ai	仁愛鄉	Rén'ài	Jîn-ài	Yìn-oi	Paran^{Atayal, Bunun, Seediq}	Nantou	Mountain indigenous
Dounan	斗南鎮	Dòunán	Táu-lâm	Téu-nàm		Yunlin	Urban
Huwei	虎尾鎮	Hǔwěi	Hó͘-bóe	Fú-mî		Yunlin	Urban
Xiluo	西螺鎮	Xīluó	Sai-lê	Sî-lô		Yunlin	Urban
Tuku	土庫鎮	Tǔkù	Thô͘-khò͘	Thú-khù		Yunlin	Urban
Beigang	北港鎮	Běigǎng	Pak-káng	Pet-kóng		Yunlin	Urban
Gukeng	古坑鄉	Gǔkēng	Kó͘-kheⁿ	Kú-hâng		Yunlin	Rural
Dapi	大埤鄉	Dàpí	Tōa-pi	Thai-phî		Yunlin	Rural
Citong	莿桐鄉	Cìtóng	Chhì-tông	Chhṳ̀-thùng		Yunlin	Rural
Linnei	林內鄉	Línnèi	Nâ-lāi	Lìm-nui		Yunlin	Rural
Erlun	二崙鄉	Èrlún	Jī-lūn	Ngi-lûn		Yunlin	Rural
Lunbei	崙背鄉	Lúnbèi	Lūn-pòe	Lûn-poi		Yunlin	Rural
Mailiao	麥寮鄉	Màiliáo	Be̍h-liâu	Ma̍k-liàu		Yunlin	Rural
Dongshi	東勢鄉	Dōngshì	Tang-sì	Tûng-sṳ		Yunlin	Rural
Baozhong	褒忠鄉	Bāozhōng	Po-tiong	Pô-chûng		Yunlin	Rural
Taixi	臺西鄉	Táixī	Tâi-se	Thòi-sî		Yunlin	Rural
Yuanchang	元長鄉	Yuánzhǎng	Goân-chiáng	Ngièn-chhòng		Yunlin	Rural
Sihu	四湖鄉	Sìhú	Sì-ô͘	Si-fù		Yunlin	Rural
Kouhu	口湖鄉	Kǒuhú	Kháu-ô͘	Khiéu-fù		Yunlin	Rural
Shuilin	水林鄉	Shuǐlín	Chúi-nâ	Súi-lìm		Yunlin	Rural
Budai	布袋鎮	Bùdài	Pò͘-tē	Pu-thoi		Chiayi	Urban
Dalin	大林鎮	Dàlín	Tōa-nâ	Thai-lìm		Chiayi	Urban
Minxiong	民雄鄉	Mínxióng	Bîn-hiông	Mìn-hiùng		Chiayi	Rural
Xikou	溪口鄉	Xīkǒu	Khe-kháu	Hâi-khiéu		Chiayi	Rural
Xingang	新港鄉	Xīngǎng	Sin-káng	Sîn-kóng		Chiayi	Rural
Lioujiao	六腳鄉	Liùjiǎo	La̍k-kha	Liuk-kiok		Chiayi	Rural
Dongshi	東石鄉	Dōngshí	Tang-chio̍h	Tûng-sa̍k		Chiayi	Rural
Yizhu	義竹鄉	Yìzhú	Gī-tek	Ngi-chuk		Chiayi	Rural
Lucao	鹿草鄉	Lùcǎo	Lok-chháu	Lu̍k-chhó		Chiayi	Rural
Shuishang	水上鄉	Shuǐshàng	Chhúi-siāng	Súi-song		Chiayi	Rural
Zhongpu	中埔鄉	Zhōngpǔ	Tiong-po͘	Chûng-phû		Chiayi	Rural
Zhuqi	竹崎鄉	Zhúqí	Tek-kiā	Chuk-khì		Chiayi	Rural
Meishan	梅山鄉	Méishān	Bôe-san	Mòi-sân		Chiayi	Rural
Fanlu	番路鄉	Fānlù	Hoan-lō͘	Fân-lu		Chiayi	Rural
Dapu	大埔鄉	Dàpǔ	Tōa-po͘	Thai-phû		Chiayi	Rural
Alishan	阿里山鄉	Ālǐshān	A-lí-san	Â-lî-sân	Psoseongana^{Tsou}	Chiayi	Mountain Indigenous
Chaozhou	潮州鎮	Cháozhōu	Tiô-chiu	Chhèu-chû		Pingtung	Urban
Donggang	東港鎮	Dōnggǎng	Tang-káng	Tûng-kóng		Pingtung	Urban
Hengchun	恆春鎮	Héngchūn	Hêng-chhun	Hèn-chhûn		Pingtung	Urban
Wandan	萬丹鄉	Wàndān	Bān-tan	Van-tân		Pingtung	Rural
Changzhi	長治鄉	Chángzhì	Tióng-tī	Chhòng-chhṳ		Pingtung	Rural
Linluo	麟洛鄉	Línluò	Lîn-lo̍k	Lìm-lo̍k		Pingtung	Rural
Jiuru	九如鄉	Jiǔrú	Kíu-jû	Kiú-yì		Pingtung	Rural
Ligang	里港鄉	Lǐgǎng	Lí-káng	Lî-kóng		Pingtung	Rural
Yanpu	鹽埔鄉	Yánpǔ	Iâm-po͘	Yâm-phû		Pingtung	Rural
Gaoshu	高樹鄉	Gāoshù	Ko-chhiū	Kô-su		Pingtung	Rural
Wanluan	萬巒鄉	Wànluán	Bān-loân	Van-lòng		Pingtung	Rural
Neipu	內埔鄉	Nèipǔ	Lāi-po͘	Lui-phû		Pingtung	Rural
Zhutian	竹田鄉	Zhútián	Tek-chhân	Chuk-thièn		Pingtung	Rural
Xinpi	新埤鄉	Xīnpí	Sin-pi	Sîn-phî		Pingtung	Rural
Fangliao	枋寮鄉	Fāngliáo	Pang-liâu	Piông-liàu		Pingtung	Rural
Xinyuan	新園鄉	Xīnyuán	Sin-hn̂g	Sîn-yèn		Pingtung	Rural
Kanding	崁頂鄉	Kǎndǐng	Khàm-téng	Kham-táng		Pingtung	Rural
Linbian	林邊鄉	Línbiān	Nâ-piⁿ	Lìm-piên		Pingtung	Rural
Nanzhou	南州鄉	Nánzhōu	Lâm-chiu	Nàm-chû		Pingtung	Rural
Jiadong	佳冬鄉	Jiādōng	Ka-tang	Kâ-tûng		Pingtung	Rural
Liuqiu	琉球鄉	Liúqiú	Liû-khiû	Liù-khiù	Lamay	Pingtung	Rural
Checheng	車城鄉	Chēchéng	Chhia-siâⁿ	Chhâ-sàng		Pingtung	Rural
Manzhou	滿州鄉	Mǎnzhōu	Bóan-chiu	Mân-chû	Manutsuru^{Paiwan}	Pingtung	Rural
Fangshan	枋山鄉	Fāngshān	Pang-soaⁿ	Piông-sân		Pingtung	Rural
Sandimen	三地門鄉	Sāndìmén	Soaⁿ-tē-mn̂g	Sâm-thi-mùn	Timur^{Paiwan}	Pingtung	Mountain Indigenous
Wutai	霧臺鄉	Wùtái	Bū-tâi	Vu-thòi	Vedai^{Rukai}	Pingtung	Mountain Indigenous
Majia	瑪家鄉	Mǎjiā	Má-ka	Mâ-kâ	Makazayazaya^{Paiwan}	Pingtung	Mountain Indigenous
Taiwu	泰武鄉	Tàiwǔ	Thài-bú	Thai-vú	Klaljuc^{Paiwan}	Pingtung	Mountain Indigenous
Laiyi	來義鄉	Láiyì	Lâi-gī	Lòi-ngi	Rai^{Paiwan}	Pingtung	Mountain Indigenous
Chunri	春日鄉	Chūnrì	Chhun-ji̍t	Chhûn-ngit	Kasugagu^{Paiwan}	Pingtung	Mountain Indigenous
Shizi	獅子鄉	Shīzǐ	Sai-chú	Sṳ̂-é	Sisigu^{Paiwan}	Pingtung	Mountain Indigenous
Mudan	牡丹鄉	Mǔdān	Bó͘-tan	Méu-tân	Sinvaudjan^{Paiwan}	Pingtung	Mountain Indigenous
Chenggong	成功鎮	Chénggōng	Sêng-kong	Sṳ̀n-kûng	Madawdaw^{Amis}	Taitung	Urban
Guanshan	關山鎮	Guānshān	Koan-san	Kûan-sân	Kinalaungan^{Bunun}	Taitung	Urban
Beinan	卑南鄉	Bēinán	Pi-lâm	Pî-nàm	Puyuma^{Amis, Puyuma}, Pinang^{Rukai}	Taitung	Rural
Dawu	大武鄉	Dàwǔ	Tāi-bú	Thai-vú	Palangoe^{Paiwan}	Taitung	Rural
Taimali	太麻里鄉	Tàimálǐ	Thài-mâ-lí	Thai-mà-lî	Tjavualji^{Amis&Paiwan}	Taitung	Rural
Donghe	東河鄉	Dōnghé	Tong-hô	Tûng-hò	Fafukod^{Amis}	Taitung	Rural
Changbin	長濱鄉	Chángbīn	Tn̂g-pin	Chhòng-pîn	Kakacawan^{Amis}	Taitung	Rural
Luye	鹿野鄉	Lùyě	Lo̍k-iá	Lu̍k-yâ	Payarapay^{Amis}	Taitung	Rural
Chishang	池上鄉	Chíshàng	Tî-siōng	Chhṳ̀-song	Fanaw^{Amis}	Taitung	Rural
Lüdao	綠島鄉	Lǜdǎo	Le̍k-tó	Liu̍k-tó	Sanasay^{Amis}, Jitanasey^{Yami}	Taitung	Rural
Yanping	延平鄉	Yánpíng	Iân-pêng	Yèn-phìn	Inpiing^{Bunun}	Taitung	Mountain indigenous
Haiduan	海端鄉	Hǎiduān	Hái-toaⁿ	Hói-tôn	Haitutuan^{Bunun}	Taitung	Mountain indigenous
Daren	達仁鄉	Dárén	Ta̍t-jîn	Tha̍t-yìn	Tadren^{Paiwan}	Taitung	Mountain indigenous
Jinfeng	金峰鄉	Jīnfēng	Kim-hong	Kîm-fûng	Kinzang^{Paiwan}	Taitung	Mountain indigenous
Lanyu	蘭嶼鄉	Lányǔ	Lân-sū	Làn-yí	Ponso no Tao^{Yami}	Taitung	Mountain indigenous
Fenglin	鳳林鎮	Fènglín	Hōng-lîm	Fung-lìm	Marlimu^{Amis}	Hualien	Urban
Yuli	玉里鎮	Yùlǐ	Gio̍k-lí	Ngiu̍k-lî	Posko^{Amis}	Hualien	Urban
Xincheng	新城鄉	Xīnchéng	Sin-siâⁿ	Sîn-sàng	Sinjiyu^{Truku}, Takidis^{Amis}	Hualien	Rural
Ji'an	吉安鄉	Jí'ān	Kiat-an	Kit-ôn	Cikasuan^{Amis}	Hualien	Rural
Shoufeng	壽豐鄉	Shòufēng	Siū-hong	Su-fûng	Ciamengan^{Amis}	Hualien	Rural
Guangfu	光復鄉	Guāngfù	Kong-ho̍k	Kông-fu̍k	Fata'an^{Amis}	Hualien	Rural
Fengbin	豐濱鄉	Fēngbīn	Hong-pin	Fûng-pîn	Fakon^{Amis}, Bakung^{Kavalan}	Hualien	Rural
Ruisui	瑞穗鄉	Ruìsuì	Sūi-sūi	Lui-sui	Kohkoh^{Amis}	Hualien	Rural
Fuli	富里鄉	Fùlǐ	Hù-lí	Fu-lî	Kongpo^{Amis}	Hualien	Rural
Xiulin	秀林鄉	Xiùlín	Siù-lîm	Siu-lìm	Bsuring^{Truku}	Hualien	Mountain Indigenous
Wanrong	萬榮鄉	Wànróng	Bān-êng	Van-yùng	Malibasi^{Truku}	Hualien	Mountain Indigenous
Zhuoxi	卓溪鄉	Zhuóxī	Toh-khe	Cho̍k-hâi	Takkei^{Bunun}	Hualien	Mountain Indigenous
Huxi	湖西鄉	Húxī	Ô͘-sai	Fù-sî		Penghu	Rural
Baisha	白沙鄉	Báishā	Pe̍h-soa	Pha̍k-sâ		Penghu	Rural
Xiyu	西嶼鄉	Xīyǔ	Sai-sū	Sî-yí		Penghu	Rural
Wang'an	望安鄉	Wàng'ān	Bāng-oaⁿ	Mong-ôn		Penghu	Rural
Cimei	七美鄉	Qīměi	Chhit-bí	Chhit-mî		Penghu	Rural
Jincheng	金城鎮	Jīnchéng	Kim-siâⁿ	Kîm-sàng		Kinmen	Urban
Jinhu	金湖鎮	Jīnhú	Kim-ô·	Kîm-fù		Kinmen	Urban
Jinsha	金沙鎮	Jīnshā	Kim-soaⁿ	Kîm-sâ		Kinmen	Urban
Jinning	金寧鄉	Jīnníng	Kim-lêng	Kîm-nèn		Kinmen	Rural
Lieyu	烈嶼鄉	Lièyǔ	Lia̍t-sū	Lie̍t-yí		Kinmen	Rural
Wuqiu	烏坵鄉	Wūqiū	O·-kiu	Vû-hiu	O-ku^{Wuqiu}	Kinmen	Rural
Nangan	南竿鄉	Nángān	Lâm-kan	Nàm-kôn	Nàng-găng^{Matsu}	Lienchiang	Rural
Beigan	北竿鄉	Běigān	Pak-kan	Pet-kôn	Báe̤k-găng^{Matsu}	Lienchiang	Rural
Juguang	莒光鄉	Jǔguāng	Kí-kong	Kí-kóng	Gṳ̄-guŏng^{Matsu}	Lienchiang	Rural
Dongyin	東引鄉	Dōngyǐn	Tang-ín	Tûng-yín	Dĕ̤ng-īng^{Matsu}	Lienchiang	Rural

== See also ==
- County (Taiwan)
- County-administered city
