= Pitou, Changhua =

Rural township in Changhua County, Taiwan

Pitou 埤頭
- Rural township
- Pitou Township · 埤頭鄉

Chinese transcription(s)
  - Traditional: 埤頭鄉
  - Pinyin: Pítóu Xiāng
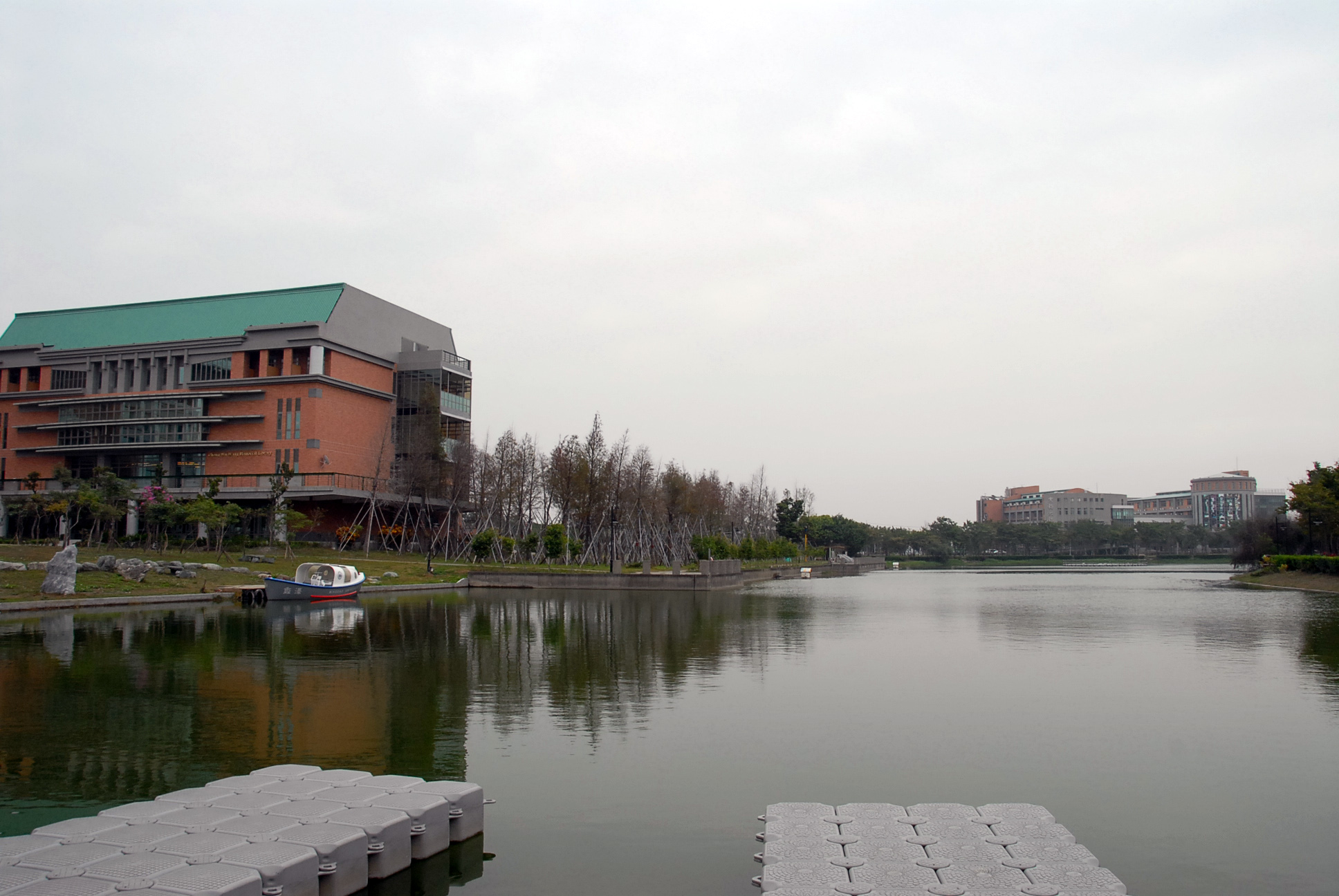

- Location within Taiwan
- Coordinates: 23°52′39″N 120°28′14″E
- Country: Taiwan
- County: Changhua

Government
  - Mayor: Chen Cang Giong

Area
  - Total: 42.75 km^{2} (16.51 sq mi)

Population (January 2023)
  - Total: 29,314
  - Density: 685.7/km^{2} (1,776/sq mi)
- Postal code: 523
- Website: www.pitou.gov.tw

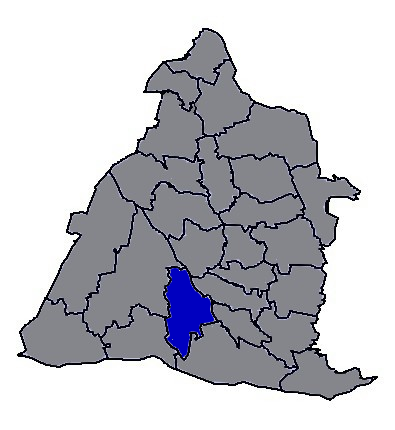
Pitou Township in Changhua County

Pitou Township (Chinese: 埤頭鄉; pinyin: Pítóu Xiāng) is a rural township in Changhua County, Taiwan. The district had a population of 29,314 as of January 2023 and an area of 42.75 square kilometres (16.51 sq mi). One of the attractions in Pitou is the Kopok Flower Boulevard.

== Administrative divisions ==
The township comprises 17 villages: Beitou, Dahu, Fuzhao, Gexing, Heli, Lilun, Liujia, Lunjiao, Lunzi, Pingyuan, Xingnong, Xinzhuang, Yongli, Yuanpu, Zhonghe, Zhuangnei and Zhuwei.

== Tourist attractions ==
Nanyun Temple in Pitou is one of the stops on the annual Dajia Mazu Pilgrimage.

== Transportation ==
Pitou is adjacent to National Highway No. 1, with Zhangshui Road another major arterial route through the township. Pitou's location around major highways plays an important role in facilitating transportation of the township's agricultural produce.
