= Wandan, Pingtung =

Rural township in Pingtung County, Taiwan

Coordinates: 22.5897°N 120.4851°E

Wandan Township 萬丹鄉
- Rural township
- Wandan Township in Pingtung County
- Location: Pingtung County, Taiwan

Area
  - Total: 57.47 km^{2} (22.19 sq mi)

Population (February 2024)
  - Total: 49,253
  - Density: 857.0/km^{2} (2,220/sq mi)

Wandan Township (Chinese: 萬丹鄉; pinyin: Wàndān Xiāng; Wade–Giles: Wan^{4}-tan^{1} Hsiang^{1}) is a rural township in Pingtung County, Taiwan.

== Names ==
Dutch records used the placenames Tamsuy and Tampsui to refer to Tamsui in the north of the island, but have also referred to this area in the south as "Tamsuy". In the early 20th century, maps showed two Tamsuy rivers, one north and one south; the Chinese would distinguish the two places by calling the north place Teng Tamsuy (upper Tamsui) and the south place E Tamsuy (lower Tamsui).

== Geography ==
It has a population total of 49,253 and an area of 57.47 square kilometres (22.19 sq mi).

== Administrative divisions ==
Villages in Wandan Township

The township comprises 30 villages: Baocuo, Gantang, Guangan, Houcun, Jiaxing, Lunding, Shangcun, Shekou, Shepi, Sheshang, Shezhong, Shuiquan, Shuixian, Siwei, Tiancuo, Wanan, Wanhou, Wanhui, Wannei, Wanquan, Wansheng, Xiabei, Xianan, Xiangshe, Xingan, Xingquan, Xinzhong, Xinzhuang, Zhuanliao and Zhulin.

== Economy ==
Brick manufacturing once flourished in the area due to the availability of clay and natural gas.

== Transportation ==
- Provincial Highway No. 27:Pingtung City － Wandan Township － Xinyuan Township
- Provincial Highway No. 88
- County Highway No. 189:Pingtung City － Wandan Township － Chaozhou Township

== Notable natives ==
- Chang Feng-hsu, Magistrate of Pingtung County (1964-1973)
- Wu Jin-lin, President of the Examination Yuan (2014–2020)
