= Changzhi, Pingtung =

Rural township in Pingtung County, Taiwan

Coordinates: 22°41′N 120°32′E

Changzhi Township 長治鄉
- Rural township
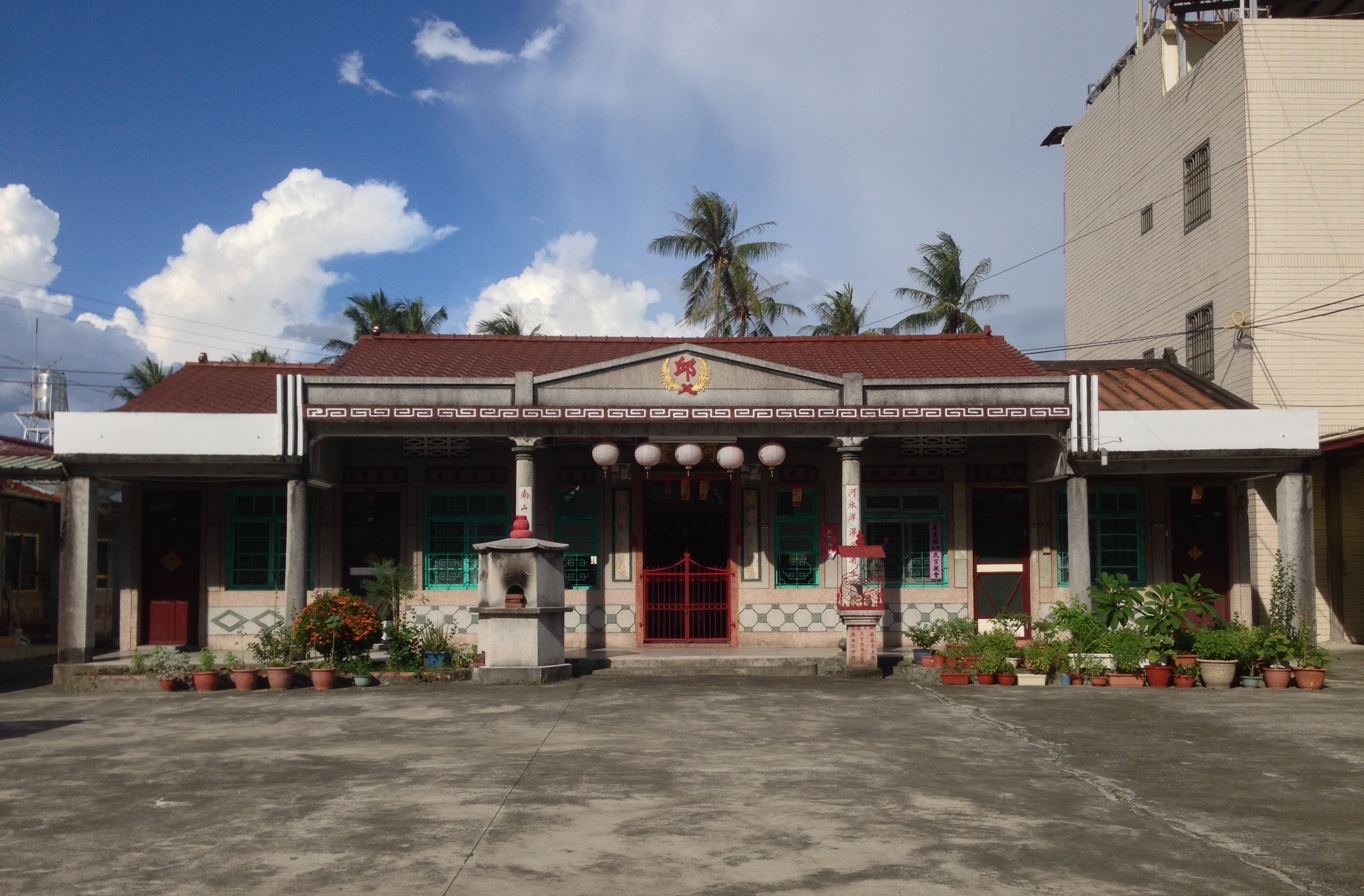

- Changzhi Township Office logo
- Interactive map of Changzhi Township
- Location: Pingtung County, Taiwan

Area
  - Total: 39.8861 km^{2} (15.4001 sq mi)

Population (February 2024)
  - Total: 29,177
  - Density: 731.51/km^{2} (1,894.6/sq mi)

Changzhi Township
- Traditional Chinese: 長治鄉
- Hanyu Pinyin: Chángzhì Xiāng
- Wade–Giles: Ch'ang^{2}-chih^{4} Hsiang^{1}
- Tongyong Pinyin: Chángjhìh Siang

Changzhi Township, also spelled Changjhih Township is a rural township in Pingtung County, Taiwan.

It is the birthplace of the Weightlifter Kuo Yi Hang

== History ==
On November 26, 1895, Japanese forces massacred villages in the area.

== Geography ==
Area: 39.89 square kilometres (15.40 sq mi)
Population: 29,177 (February 2024)

== Administrative divisions ==
Administrative divisions of Changzhi Township: 1 Changxing, 2 Tantou, 3 Xiangyang, 4 Xintang, 5 Jinxing, 6 Lunshang, 7 Fuxing, 8 Decheng, 9 Derong, 10 Dexie, 11 Dehe, 12 Fanhua, 13 Ronghua, 14 Fanchang, 15 Fanrong, 16 Fanlong

The township comprises 16 villages: Decheng, Dehe, Derong, Dexie, Fuxing, Jinxing, Lunshang, Fanchang, Fanhua, Fanlong, Fanrong, Ronghua, Tantou, Xiangyang, Xintang and Changxing.
