= Yanpu =

Rural township in Pingtung County, Taiwan

Coordinates: 22.7544°N 120.5724°E

Yanpu Township 鹽埔鄉
- Rural township
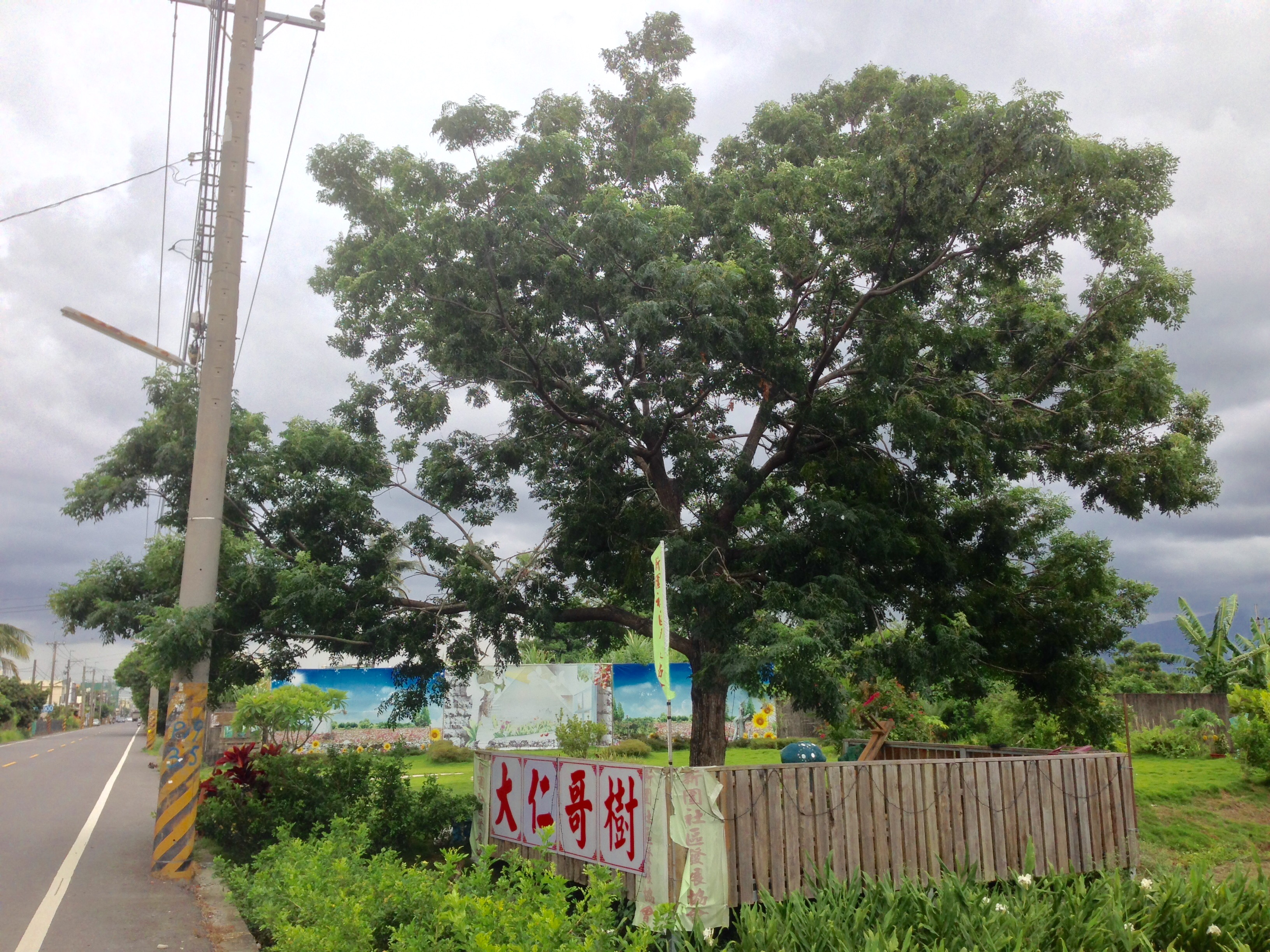

- Yanpu Township in Pingtung County
- Location: Pingtung County, Taiwan

Area
  - Total: 64 km^{2} (25 sq mi)

Population (February 2024)
  - Total: 23,878
  - Density: 370/km^{2} (970/sq mi)

Yanpu Township
- Traditional Chinese: 鹽埔鄉
- Hanyu Pinyin: Yánpǔ Xiāng
- Wade–Giles: Yen^{2}-p'u^{3} Hsiang^{1}
- Pha̍k-fa-sṳ: Yâm-phû-hiông
- Hokkien POJ: Iâm-po͘-hiong

Yanpu Township is a rural township in Pingtung County, Taiwan.

== Geography ==
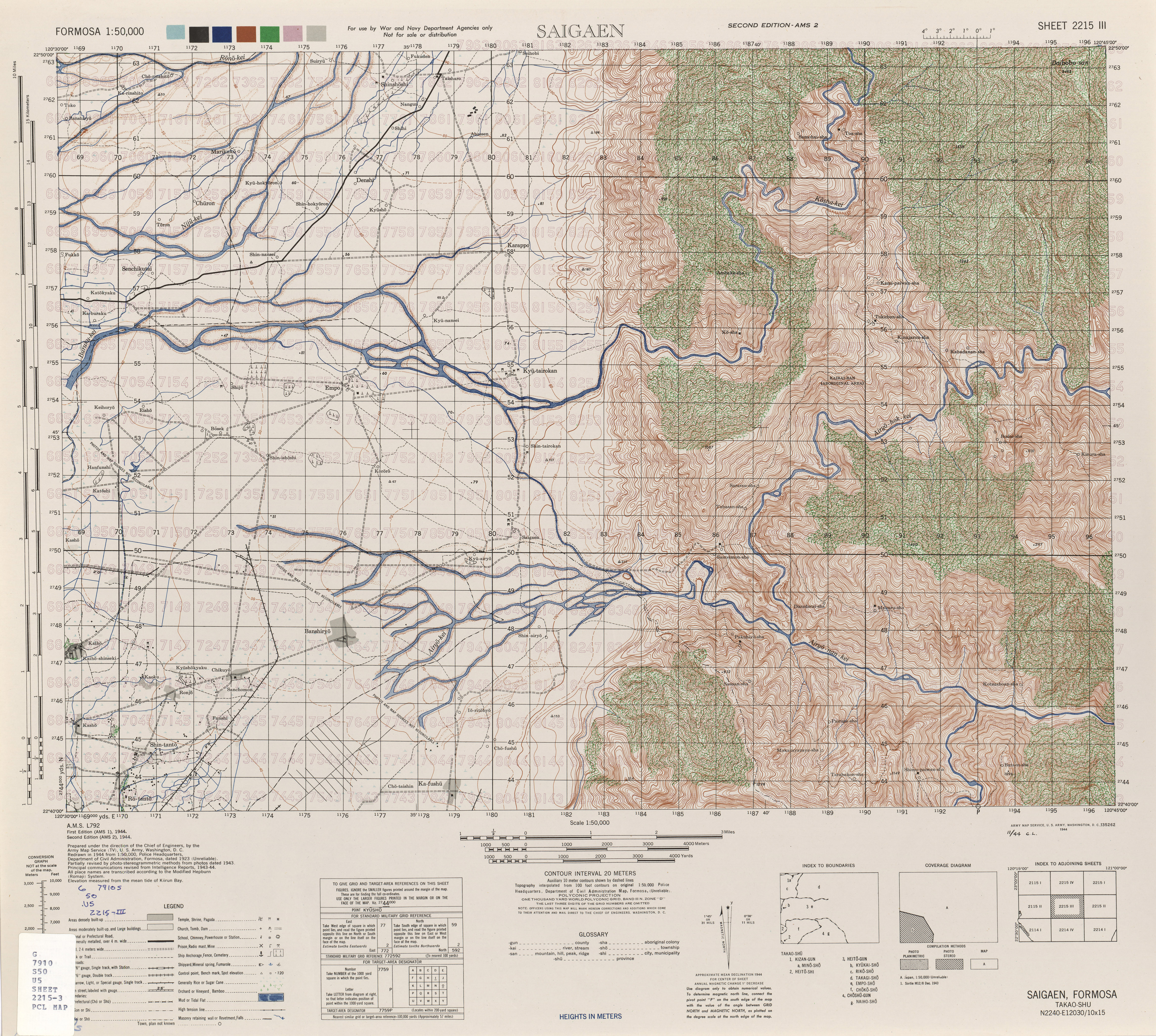
Map including Yanpu (labeled as Empo) (1944)

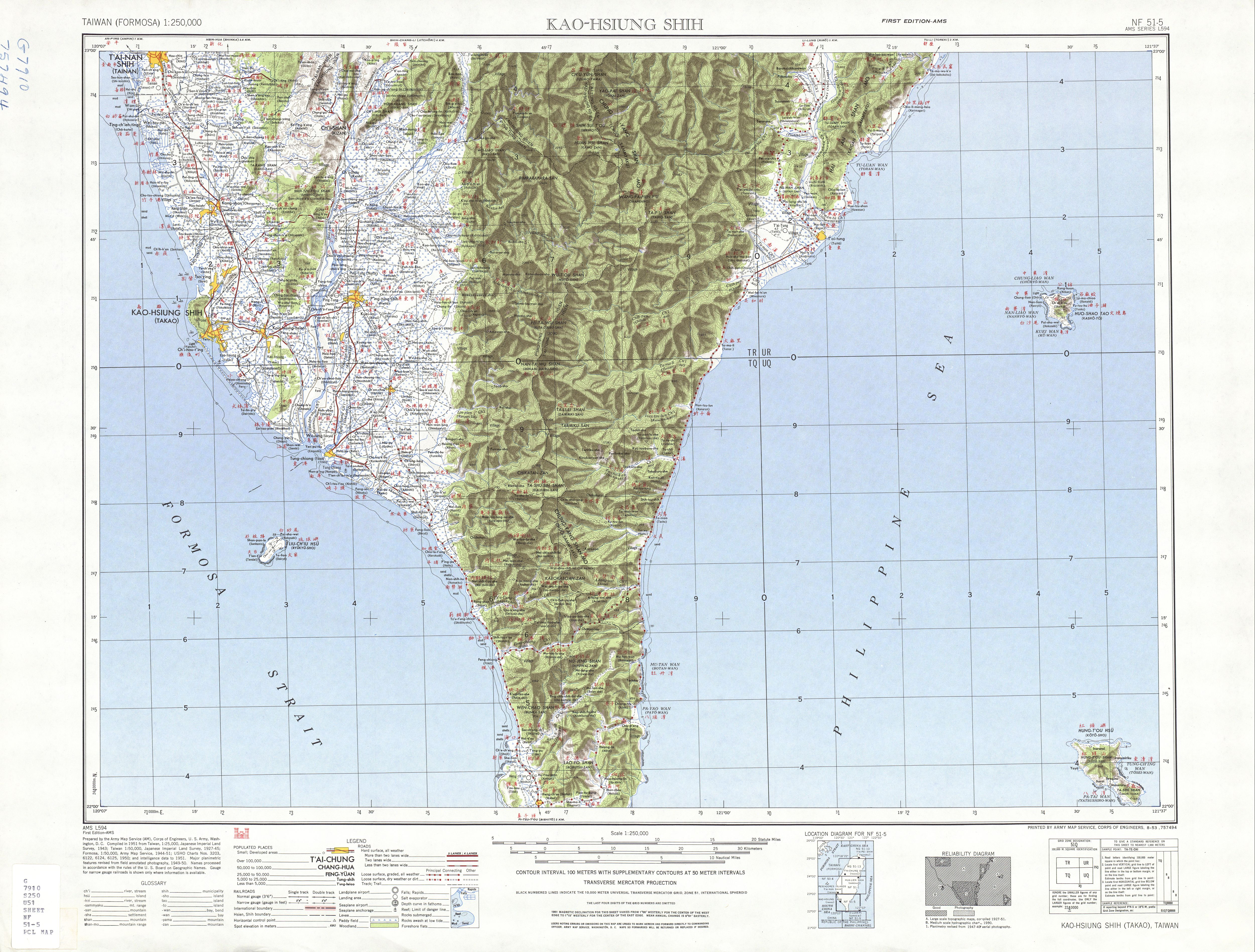
Map including Yanpu (labeled as Yen-pu (Empo) 塩埔) (1951)

- Population: 23,878 (February 2024)
- Area: 64.35 square kilometres (24.85 sq mi)

== Administrative divisions ==
The township comprises 12 villages: Gaolang, Jiuai, Luoyang, Pengcuo, Shirong, Xiner, Xinwei, Yanbei, Yannan, Yanzhong, Yonglong and Zhenxing.

== Education ==
- Tajen University
