= Xinpi =

Rural township in Pingtung County, Taiwan

Coordinates: 22.487975°N 120.581447°E

Xinpi Township 新埤鄉
- Rural township
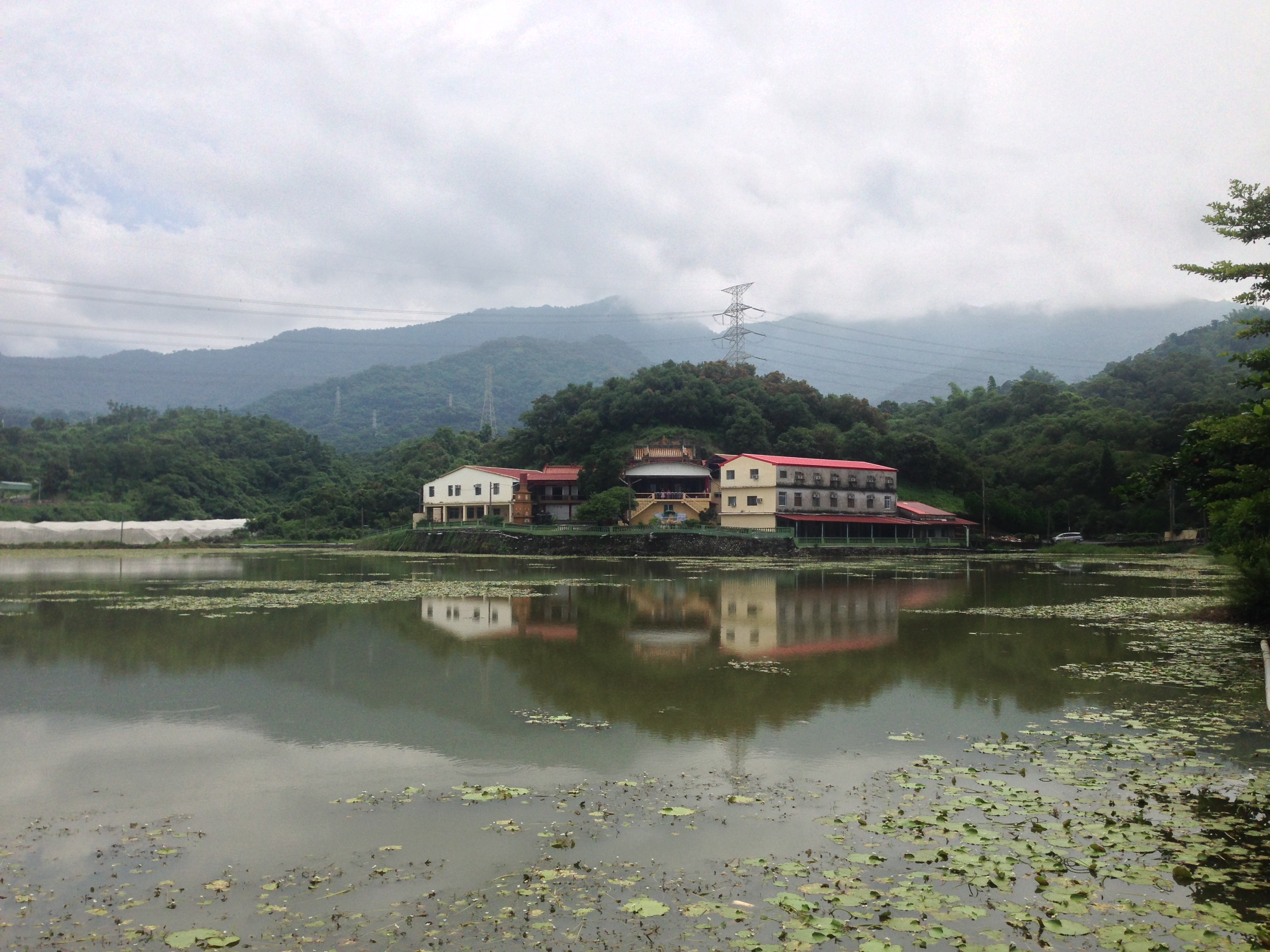

- Xinpi Township in Pingtung County
- Location: Pingtung County, Taiwan

Area
  - Total: 59 km^{2} (23 sq mi)

Population (February 2024)
  - Total: 9,296
  - Density: 160/km^{2} (410/sq mi)

Xinpi Township
- Traditional Chinese: 新埤鄉
- Hanyu Pinyin: Xīnpí Xiāng
- Wade–Giles: Hsin^{1}-p'i^{2} Hsiang^{1}
- Tongyong Pinyin: Sinpí Siang
- Romanization: Sîn-phî-hiông
- Hokkien POJ: Sin-pi-hiong

Xinpi Township, also spelled Sinpi, is a rural township in Pingtung County, Taiwan.

== Geography ==
Population: 9,296 (February 2024)
Area: 59.01 km^{2} (22.78 sq mi)

== Administrative divisions ==
The township comprises seven villages: Datie, Jiangong, Jihu, Nanfeng, Wanlong, Xiangtan and Xinbei.
