= Kanding =

Rural township in Pingtung County, Taiwan

Coordinates: 22.519376°N 120.50317°E

Kanding Township 崁頂鄉
- Rural township

- Kanding Township in Pingtung County
- Location: Pingtung County, Taiwan

Area
  - Total: 31 km^{2} (12 sq mi)

Population (February 2024)
  - Total: 15,209
  - Density: 490/km^{2} (1,300/sq mi)

Kanding Township
- Traditional Chinese: 崁頂鄉
- Hanyu Pinyin: Kǎndǐng Xiāng
- Wade–Giles: K'an^{3}-ting^{3} Hsiang^{1}
- Pha̍k-fa-sṳ: Kham-táng-hiông
- Hokkien POJ: Khàm-téng-hiong

Kanding Township is a rural township in Pingtung County, Taiwan.

== Geography ==
It has a population total of 15,209 and an area of 31.27 square kilometres (12.07 sq mi).

== Administrative divisions ==
The township comprises eight villages: Beishi, Gangtung, Kanding, Lishe, Weinei, Yuanliao, Yuexi and Zhouzi.

== Transportation ==
- TR Kanding Station
