= Nanzhou, Pingtung =

Rural township in Pingtung County, Taiwan

Coordinates: 22.478934°N 120.515629°E

Nanzhou Township 南州鄉
- Rural township
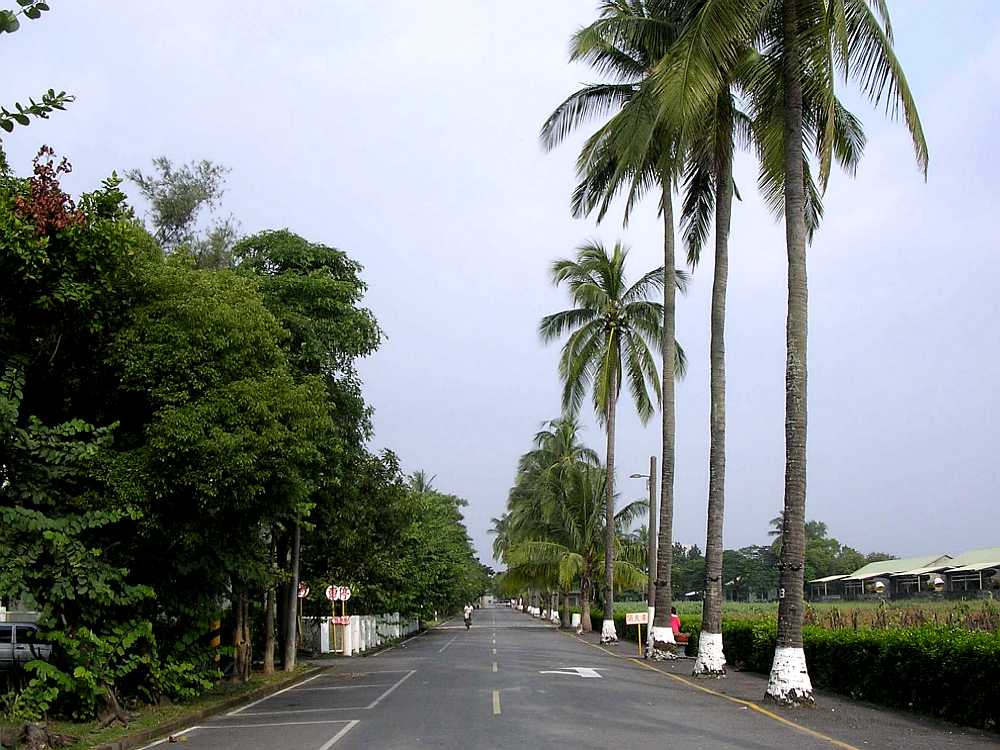

- Nanzhou Township in Pingtung County
- Location: Pingtung County, Taiwan

Area
  - Total: 19 km^{2} (7.3 sq mi)

Population (February 2024)
  - Total: 9,844
  - Density: 520/km^{2} (1,300/sq mi)

Nanzhou Township (also spelled Nanjhou; Chinese: 南州鄉; Hanyu Pinyin: Nánzhōu Xiāng; Tongyong Pinyin: Nánjhou Siang) is a rural township in Pingtung County, Taiwan. It has a population total of 9,844 (February 2024) and an area of 18.97 square kilometres (7.32 sq mi).

== Administrative divisions ==
The township comprises 10 villages: Milun, Nanan, Qikuai, Renli, Shouyuan, Tongan, Wanhua, Xibei, Xinan and Xizhou.

== Education ==
- Tzu Hui Institute of Technology

== Transportation ==
Nanzhou Township is accessible by Nanzhou Station of the Taiwan Railway Pingtung Line.
