= Taiwu, Pingtung =

Mountain indigenous township in Pingtung County, Taiwan

Coordinates: 22°31′N 120°26′E

Taiwu Township 泰武鄉
- Mountain indigenous township
- Mount Kavulungan (Dawushan), considered sacred to the Paiwan people

- Taiwu Township in Pingtung County
- Location: Pingtung County, Taiwan

Area
  - Total: 119 km^{2} (46 sq mi)

Population (February 2024)
  - Total: 5,288
  - Density: 44.4/km^{2} (115/sq mi)

Taiwu Township (simplified Chinese: 泰武乡; traditional Chinese: 泰武鄉; pinyin: Tàiwǔ Xiāng) is a mountain indigenous township in Pingtung County, Taiwan. It has a population of 5,288 and an area of 118.63 square kilometres (45.80 sq mi) The main population is the indigenous Paiwan people.

== Administrative divisions ==
The township comprises six villages: Jiaping, Jiaxing, Pinghe, Taiwu, Wanan and Wutan.
