= Xinyuan, Pingtung =

Rural township in Pingtung County, Taiwan

Coordinates: 22.514936°N 120.447037°E

Xinyuan Township 新園鄉 Shin'en
- Rural township
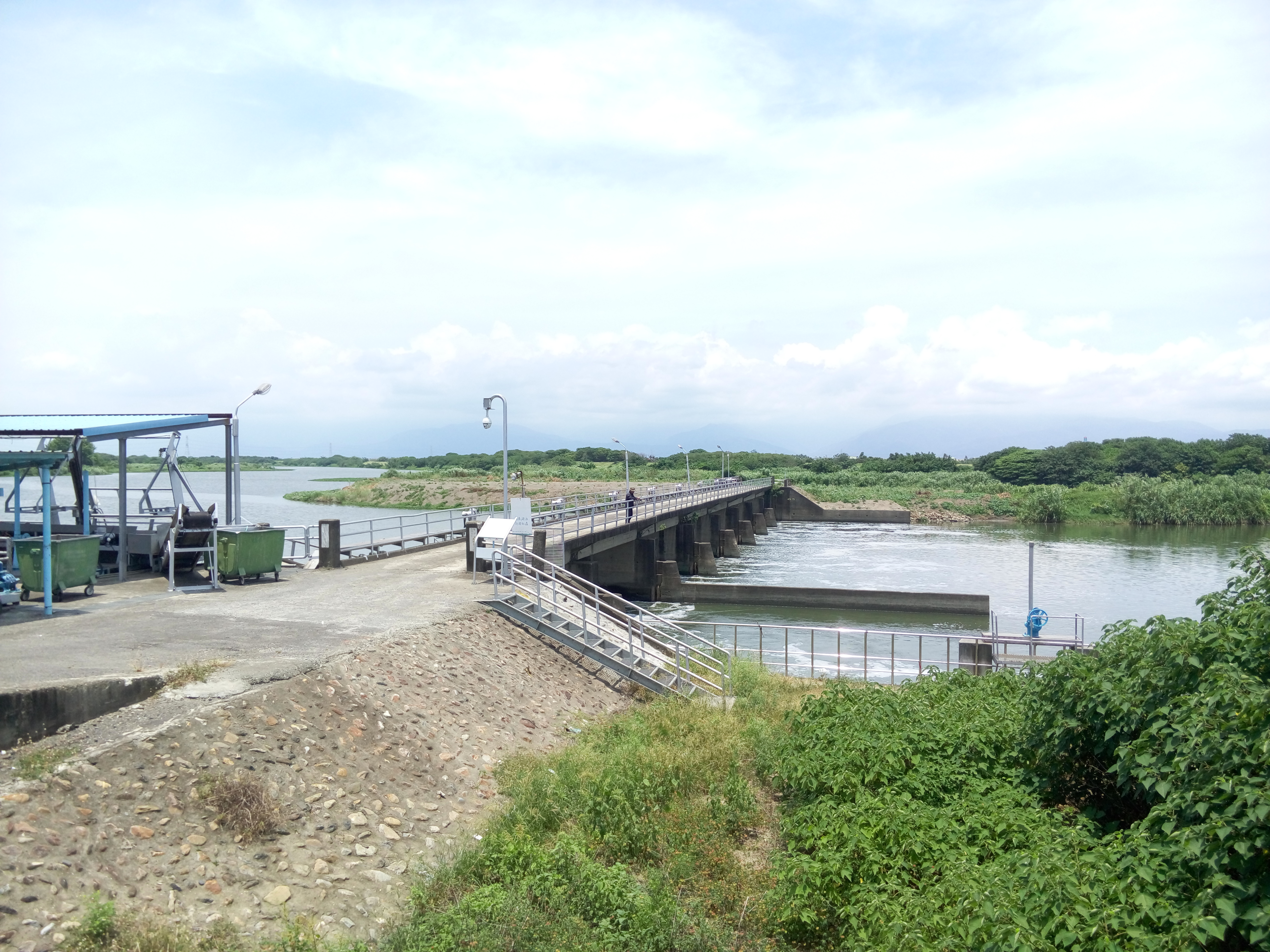

- Xinyuan Township in Pingtung County
- Location: Pingtung County, Taiwan

Area
  - Total: 38 km^{2} (15 sq mi)

Population (February 2024)
  - Total: 32,601
  - Density: 860/km^{2} (2,200/sq mi)

Xinyuan Township
- Traditional Chinese: 新園鄉
- Hanyu Pinyin: Xīnyuán Xiāng
- Wade–Giles: Hsin^{1}-yüan^{2} Hsiang^{1}
- Tongyong Pinyin: Sinyuán Siang
- Romanization: Sîn-yèn-hiông
- Hokkien POJ: Sin-hn̂g-hiong

Xinyuan Township, also spelled Sinyuan and Shinyuan, is a rural township in Pingtung County, Taiwan.

== Geography ==
- Population: 32,601 (February 2024)
- Area: 38.31 square kilometres (14.79 sq mi)

== Administrative divisions ==
The township comprises 15 villages: Gangqi, Gangxi, Gonghe, Nanlong, Neizhuang, Tianyang, Wayao, Wufang, Wulong, Xianji, Xinglong, Xintung, Xinyuan, Yanpu and Zhongzhou.

== Tourist attractions ==
- Jinde Bridge

== Notable natives ==
- Chien Tai-lang, Secretary-General of the Executive Yuan (2015–2016)
- Huang Wen-hsing, singer and actor
