= Laiyi, Pingtung =

Mountain indigenous township in Pingtung County, Taiwan

Coordinates: 22°32′N 120°41′E

Laiyi Township 來義鄉
- Mountain indigenous township

- Laiyi Township in Pingtung County
- Location: Pingtung County, Taiwan

Area
  - Total: 168 km^{2} (65 sq mi)

Population (February 2024)
  - Total: 7,369
  - Density: 43.9/km^{2} (114/sq mi)

Laiyi Township (Chinese: 來義鄉; pinyin: Láiyì Xiāng; Wade–Giles: Lai^{2}-i^{4} Hsiang^{1}) is a mountain indigenous township in Pingtung County, Taiwan at the foot of Dawu Mountain. Laiyi is the native home of the Paiwan people. Many ancient customs and religious rites are still practiced in Laiyi, which has been regarded as the traditional religious center for the Paiwan Tribe.

Laiyi is scenic with many streams spanned by suspension bridges, waterfalls and cliffs, and aboriginal totem sculptures.

== Administrative divisions ==
The township comprises seven villages: Danlin, Gulou, Laiyi, Nanhe, Wangjia, Wenle and Yilin.
