= Chunri, Pingtung =

Mountain indigenous township in Pingtung County, Taiwan

Coordinates: 22°22′16″N 120°37′45″E

Chunri Township 春日鄉 Kasuga, Kasuvongan
- Mountain indigenous township
- Chunri Township in Pingtung County
- Location: Pingtung County, Taiwan

Area
  - Total: 160 km^{2} (62 sq mi)

Population (February 2024)
  - Total: 4,887
  - Density: 31/km^{2} (79/sq mi)

Chunri Township (Chinese: 春日鄉; Hanyu Pinyin: Chūnrì Xiāng; Tongyong Pinyin: Chunrìh Siang; Wade–Giles: Ch'un^{1}-jih^{4} Hsiang^{1})is a mountain indigenous township in Pingtung County, Taiwan. The main population is the Paiwan people of the Taiwanese aborigines.

== Geography ==
The township has an area of 160.0 square kilometres (61.8 sq mi) and a population of 4,887 people (February 2024).

== Administrative divisions ==
The township comprises six villages: Chunri, Guhua, Guichong, Lili, Qijia and Shiwen.
