= Vase Rock =

Rock in Liuqiu, Pingtung County, Taiwan

Vase Rock 花瓶石
- Sea stack
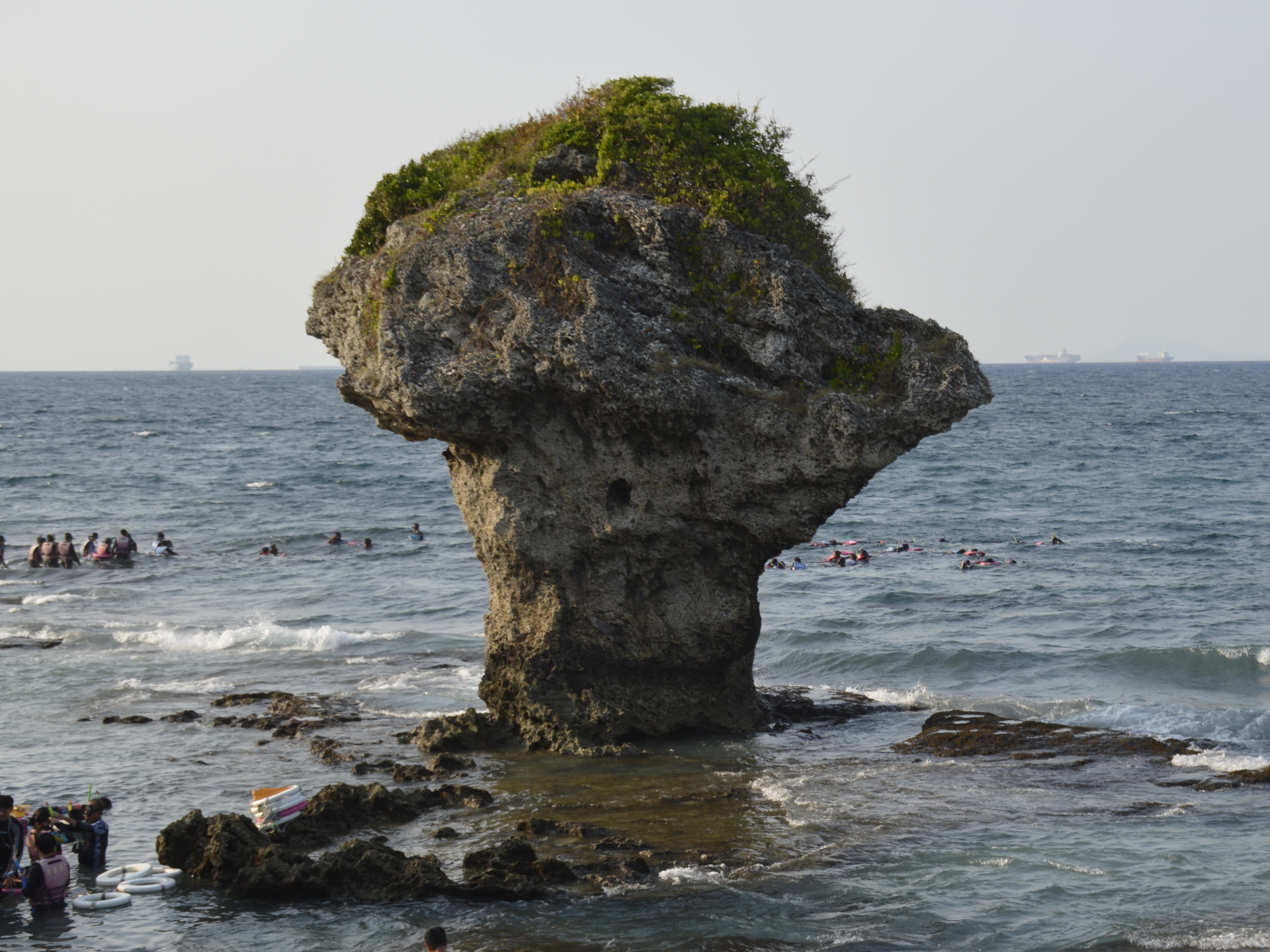

- Coordinates: 22°21′20.4″N 120°22′50.7″E
- Location: Liuqiu, Pingtung County, Taiwan
- Geology: rock

Vase Rock
- Chinese: 花瓶石
- Literal meaning: Vase Rock
Transcriptions
Standard Mandarin
- Hanyu Pinyin: Huāpíng Shí
- Wade–Giles: Hua-p‘ing Shih

Vase Rock is a rock just off Liuqiu Island of Pingtung County, Taiwan.

== Geology ==
The rock was formed by the rising of the coastal coral reef. Its lower part has been eroded by the sea thus forming a vase-shaped structure. Its highest point stands at a height of 9 meters (30 ft).

== Legacy ==
The Liuqiu township's tourism department ascribes the island's former name "Golden Lion Island" to Vase Rock's supposed resemblance to a lion's head, although the name actually honors the slaughtered crew of the Dutch ship Gouden Leeuw, the punitive reprisals for which—particularly the Liuqiu Island Massacre—depopulated the island in the 1630s and 1640s.

== See also ==
- Geology of Taiwan
