= Black Dwarf Cave =

Cave in Liuqiu, Pingtung County, Taiwan

- 烏鬼洞
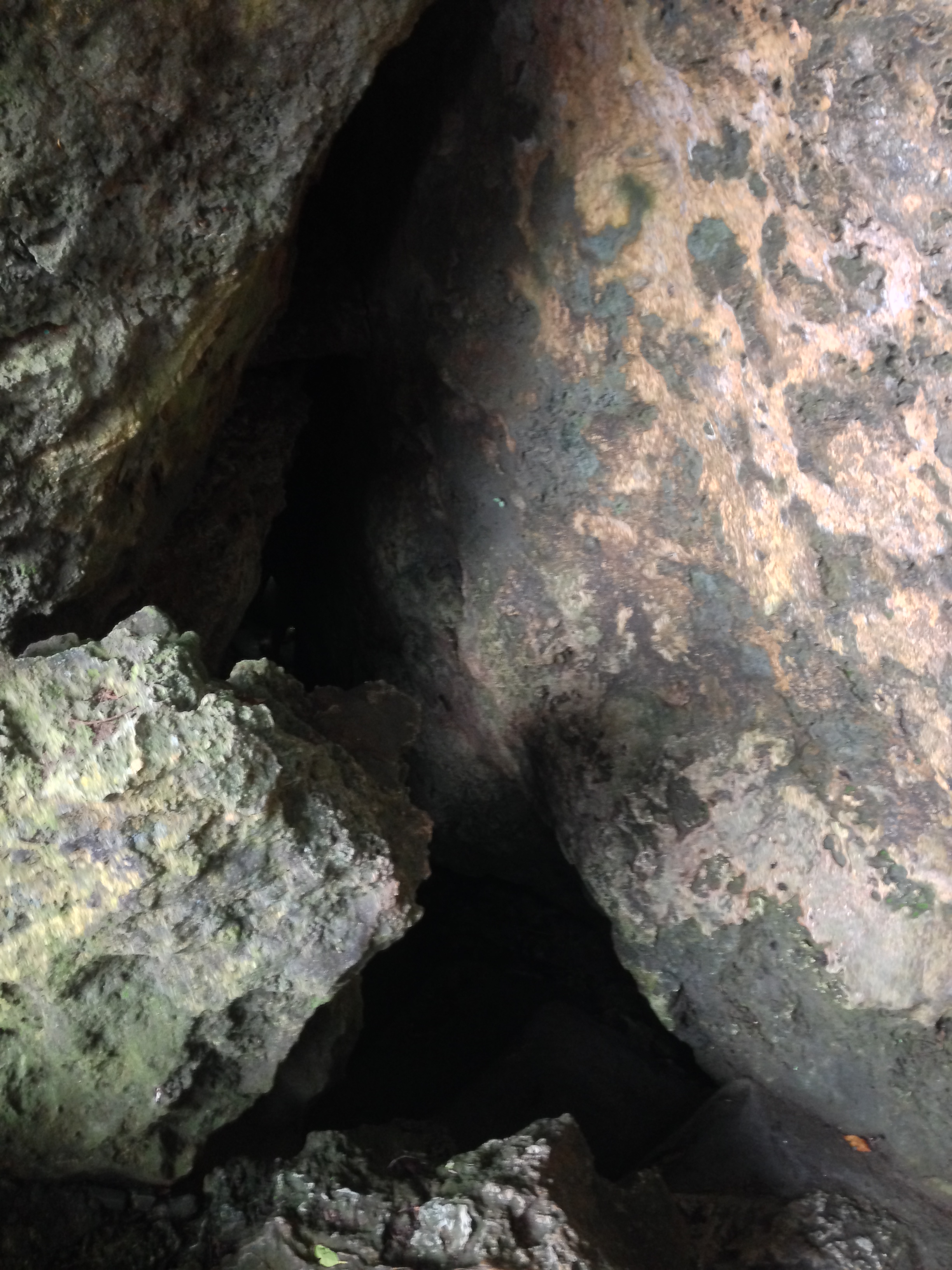

- Location within Pingtung County
- Location: Liuqiu, Pingtung County, Taiwan
- Coordinates: 22°19′48.7″N 120°21′20.6″E
- Geology: solutional cave

Black Dwarf Cave
- Traditional Chinese: 烏鬼洞
- Simplified Chinese: 乌鬼洞
- Literal meaning: Cave of the Black Ghosts; Cave of the Black Demons
Transcriptions
Standard Mandarin
- Hanyu Pinyin: Wūguǐdòng
- Wade–Giles: Wu-kuei Tong

Black Dwarf Cave Scenic Area
- Traditional Chinese: 烏鬼洞風景區
- Simplified Chinese: 乌鬼洞风景区
Transcriptions
Standard Mandarin
- Hanyu Pinyin: Wūguǐdòng Fēngjǐng Qū
- Wade–Giles: Wu-kuei Tong Fêng-ching Ch‘ü

Black Dwarf Cave is a cave and tourist attraction in Tianfu Village on Liuqiu Island, off Pingtung County, Taiwan. Its scenic area includes paths around the surrounding coasts and its ticket includes access to some other nearby attractions such as Mountain Pig Ditch and Beauty Cave.

== Name ==
The Chinese name of the cave does not involve dwarves but devils, ghosts, or spirits. Carved on the entrance of the cave is this story:

It was in 1661 (the 15th year of the Yong Li Ming Dynasty) national hero Koxinga (Cheng Chen-kung, 鄭成功), knighted as Yen Ping King, drove the Dutch and restored Taiwan and the Pescadores (Penghu). During the Dutch escape, some Negroes were separated from their unit and arrived at this island. They lived in this cave. Some years later, a British boat with soldiers landed at the place northeast of the cave. As they were enjoying the scenery, those Negroes robbed their food and other things, burned the boat and killed all the British. It was discovered by the British warship that they landed this island and sought the murderers while the Negroes hid in the cave. In spite of many threats, they refused to surrender. Finally, the British burned the cave with oil. Then, all the Negroes died there in the cave. Later it was named as the Black Spirit Cave, which means the cave in which the foreign Negroes had lived before.

The township website reports that black slaves "abandoned the Dutch" and "were found" in the cave, but doesn't credit their discovery to aggrieved British. Instead, it says that the local Taiwanese and Filipino fishermen and traders often anchored in Geban Bay and the slaves became pirates who would cut holes in the bottoms of the boats by night and then raid their wrecks. At some point, crews who had experienced this before investigated the area, discovered the cave, and massacred the pirates with a large fire.

Both legends were later fabrications. The actual "Negroes" were the members of the local Siraya tribe, who were slaughtered by the Dutch in the old cave during the Liuqiu Island Massacre.

== History ==
At some point after the Qing Dynasty, the roof of the cave's entrance and main cavern collapsed. It wasn't reopened until 1975, when the township government turned it into a tourist attraction.

== Geology ==
The cave is a solutional cave. The main entrance of the cave has collapsed leaving only one narrow passage, which is long, narrow, dark, and very damp.

== See also ==
- Geology of Taiwan
- Beauty & Lobster Caves
