= Dafu Port =

Port in Liuqiu, Pingtung County, Taiwan

Dafu Port 大福漁港
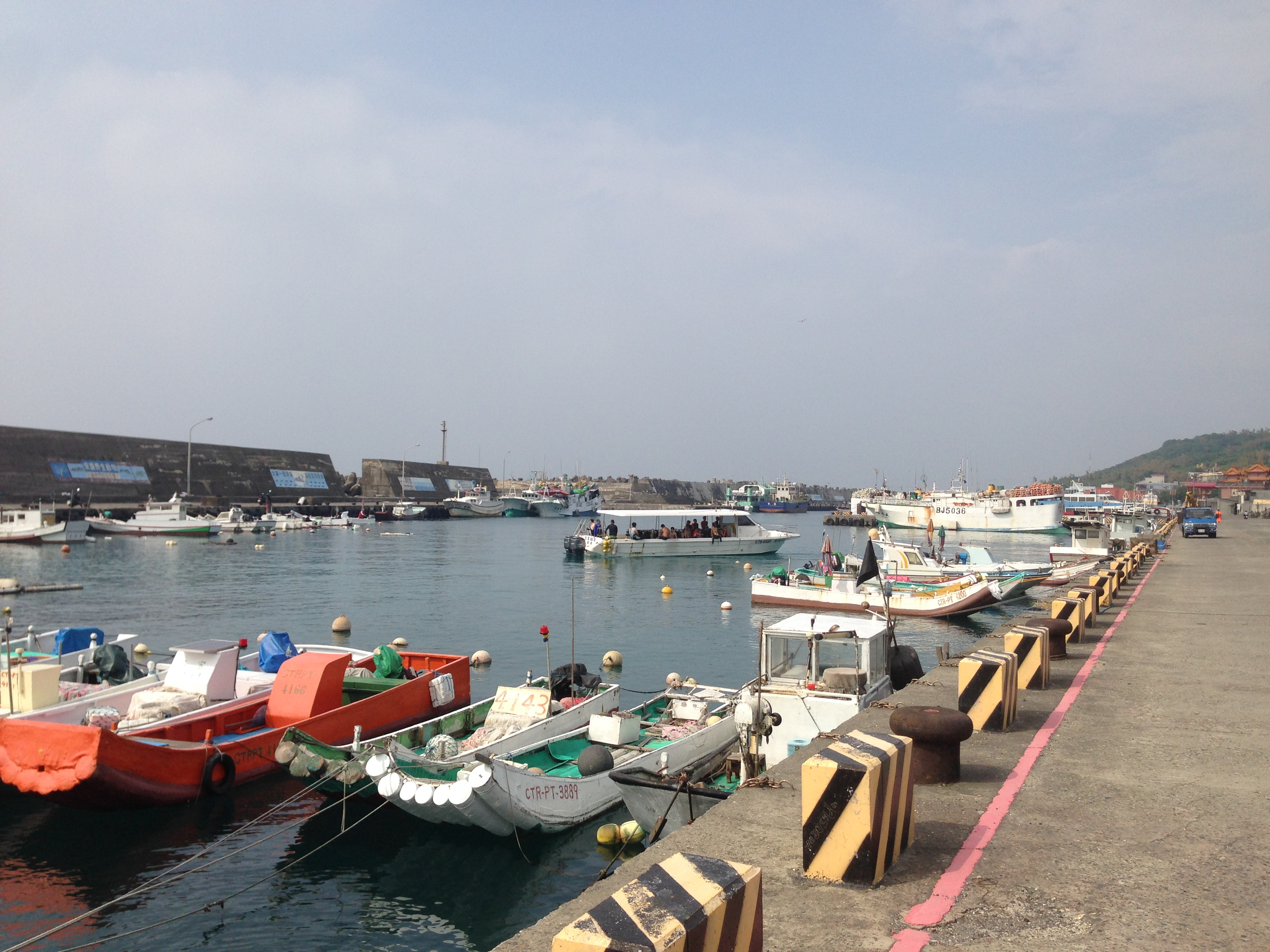
- Interactive map of Dafu Port 大福漁港
- Location within Taiwan

Location
- Location: Liuqiu, Pingtung County, Taiwan
- Coordinates: 22°21′11.4″N 120°23′2″E

Details
- Type of Harbor: port

Dafu Port (traditional Chinese: 大福漁港; simplified Chinese: 大福渔港; pinyin: Dàfú Yúgǎng) is a port on Liuqiu Island in Pingtung County, Taiwan. It is a home port for fishing vessels that operate from the island. It is the second largest port on the island after Baisha Port.

== Destination ==
The port serves passenger ferries and cargo ships to Donggang Township on the island of Taiwan.

== See also ==
- Transportation in Taiwan
