= Beauty Cave =

Cave in Liuqiu, Pingtung County, Taiwan

- 美人洞
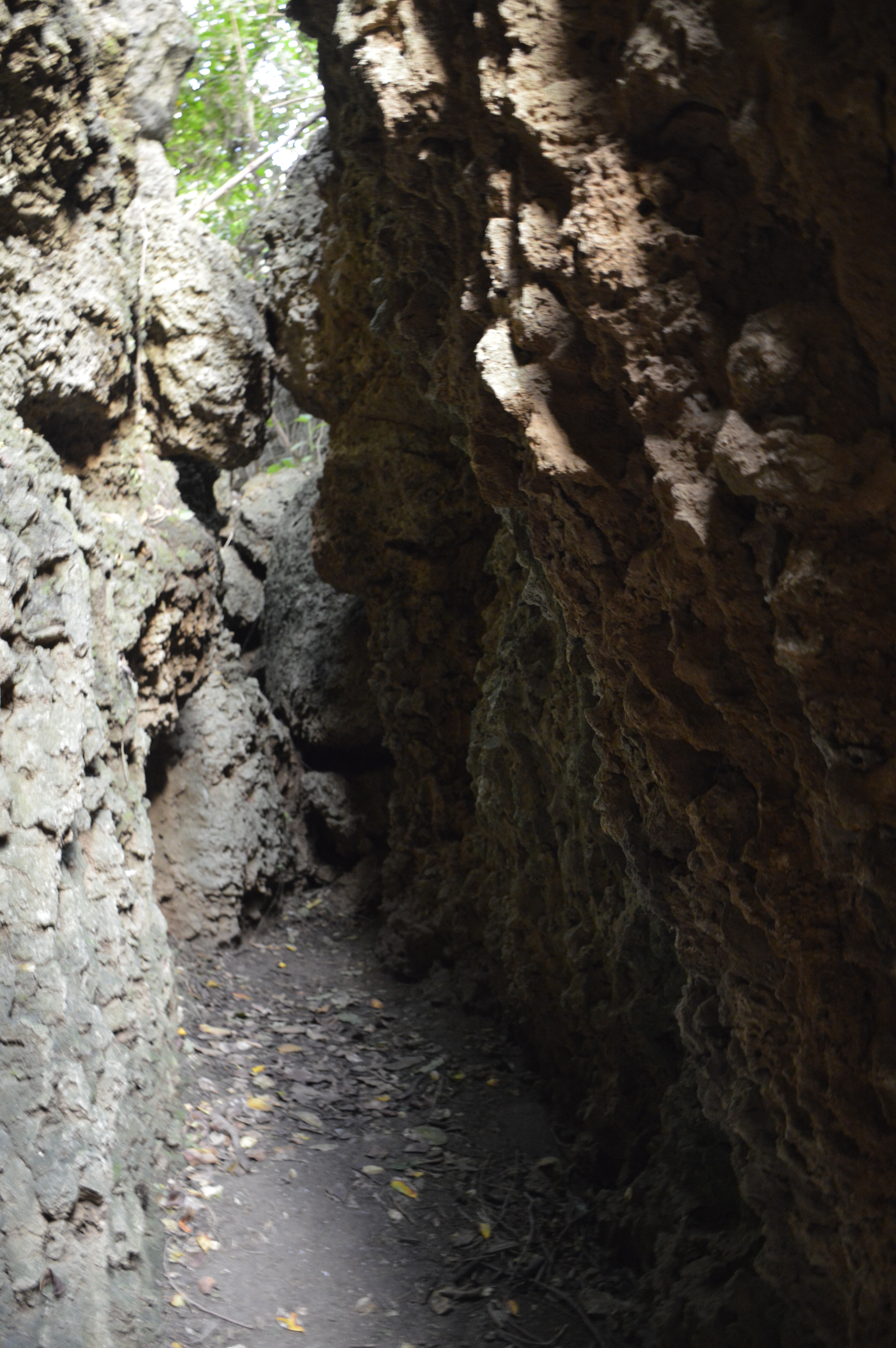

- Location within Pingtung County
- Location: Liuqiu, Pingtung County, Taiwan
- Coordinates: 22°21′10.4″N 120°22′18.6″E
- Geology: solutional cave

Beauty Cave
- Chinese: 美人洞
- Literal meaning: Beautiful Person Cave
Transcriptions
Standard Mandarin
- Hanyu Pinyin: Měirén Dòng
- Wade–Giles: Mei-jên Tung

Alternative Chinese name
- Traditional Chinese: 美人洞風景區
- Simplified Chinese: 美人洞风景区
- Literal meaning: Beauty Cave Scenic Area
Transcriptions
Standard Mandarin
- Hanyu Pinyin: Měiréndòng Fēngjǐng Qū
- Wade–Giles: Mei-jên Tung Fêng-ching Ch‘ü

Beauty Cave is a cave in Liuqiu Township, Pingtung County, Taiwan. It is administered as a scenic area whose ticket also includes access to nearby Mountain Pig Ditch and Black Dwarf Cave.

== Name ==
The name of the cave derives from local legends that it was the home of a beautiful young woman centuries ago. In one version of the story, during the Wanli Era of the Ming Dynasty (1572–1620), she survived a shipwreck in the Taiwan Strait and made the cave her own home, surviving on spring water and wild fruits. In another, the inhabitant of the cave was a Ming loyalist who was exiled from mainland China during its conquest by the Qing in the 17th century. His young and filial daughter accompanied him into exile, and they survived on plants and fish. When the father finally died, the daughter was overwhelmed. Rather than join the island's other inhabitants, she bit off her own tongue and committed suicide.

== Geography ==
The cave is a solutional cave formed by the gradual erosion of Liuqiu Island's limestone. It also features fossilized shells and corals. The surrounding scenic area includes other nearby caves, divided into two parts and connected by 13 paths.

== History ==
The cave was built in 1075.

== See also ==
- Geology of Taiwan
- Black Dwarf & Lobster Caves
