= Liuchiu Yu Lighthouse =

Lighthouse in Liuqiu, Pingtung County, Taiwan

Liuchiu Yu Lighthouse 琉球嶼燈塔
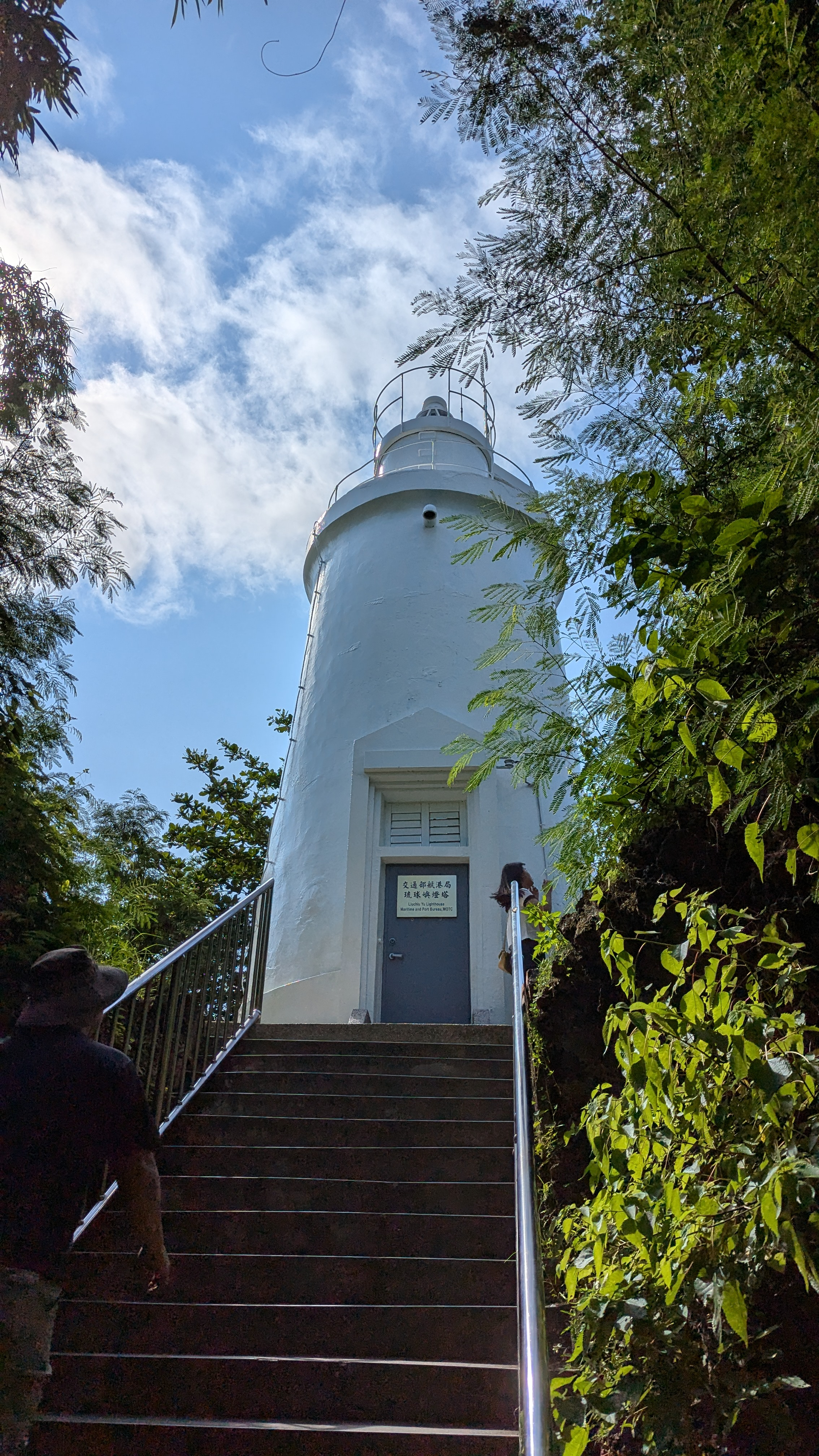
- Location: Liuqiu, Pingtung County, Taiwan
- Coordinates: 22°19′43.8″N 120°21′59.5″E

Tower
- Constructed: 1929 (rebuilt 1952)
- Height: 11 metres (36 ft)
- Markings: White tower, white lantern dome
- Operator: Taipei Customs Office of the Ministry of Finance

Light
- Focal height: 88.7 m (291 ft)
- Range: 20 nautical miles (37 km; 23 mi)

The Liuchiu Yu Lighthouse or White Lighthouse (traditional Chinese: 琉球嶼燈塔; simplified Chinese: 琉球屿灯塔; pinyin: Liúqiú Yǔ Dēngtǎ) is a lighthouse in Liuqiu Township, Pingtung County, Taiwan.

== History ==
The lighthouse was built in 1929. World War II caused damage to the structure. In 1952, the management and reparation of the lighthouse was transferred to the Customs Administration.

== Architecture ==
The lighthouse is a white round tower standing 11 metres (36 ft) in height.

== See also ==
- List of tourist attractions in Taiwan
- List of lighthouses in Taiwan
