= Lobster Cave =

Cave in Liuqiu, Pingtung County, Taiwan

- 龍蝦洞
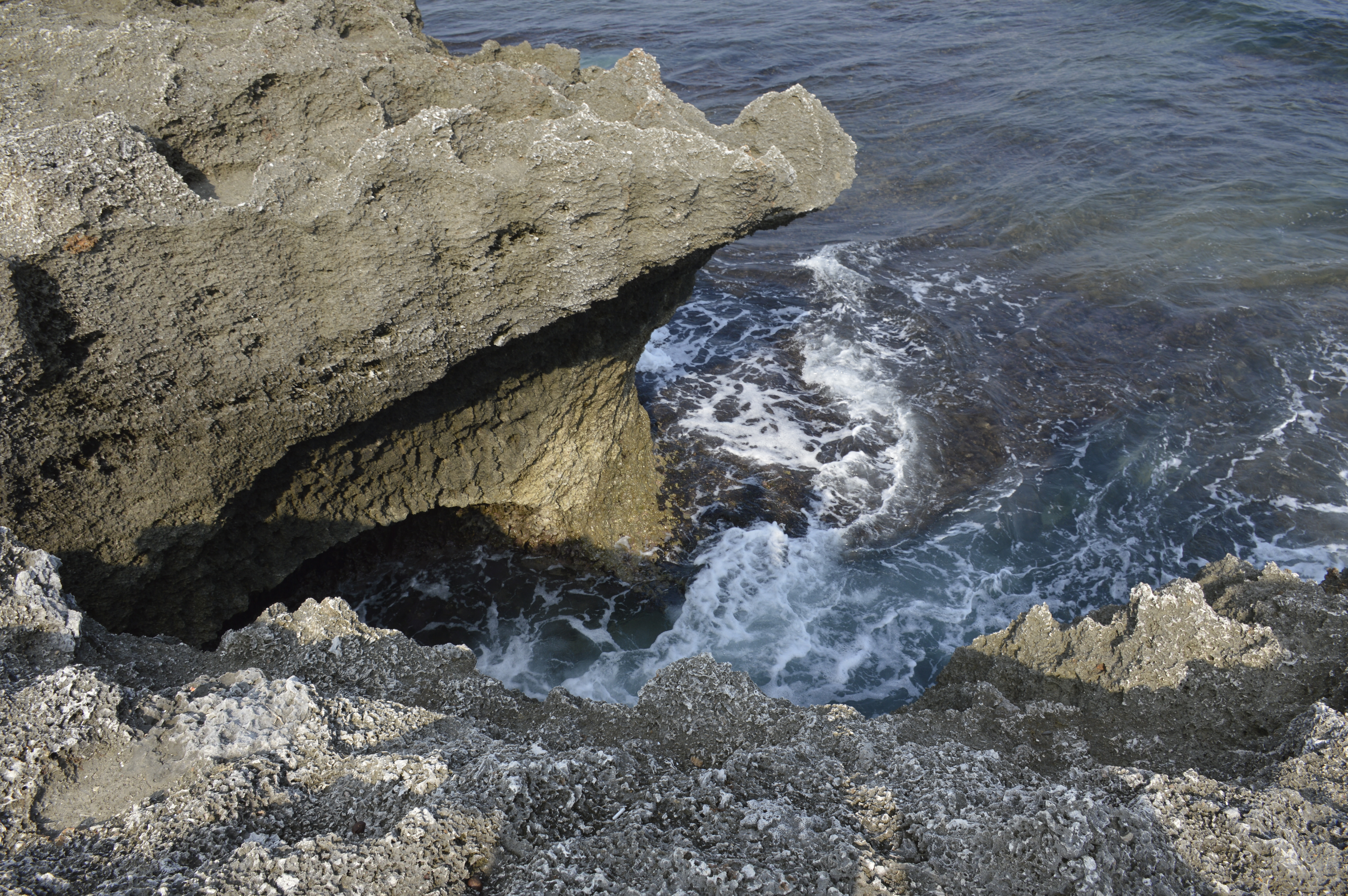

- Location within Pingtung County
- Location: Liuqiu, Pingtung County, Taiwan
- Coordinates: 22°20′41.5″N 120°23′17.9″E
- Geology: cave

Lobster Cave
- Traditional Chinese: 龍蝦洞
- Simplified Chinese: 龙虾洞
- Literal meaning: Lobster Cave
Transcriptions
Standard Mandarin
- Hanyu Pinyin: Lóngxiā Dòng
- Wade–Giles: Lung-hsia Tung

Lobster Cave is a cave on Liuqiu Island, off Pingtung County, Taiwan.

== Name ==
"Lobster Cave" is a calque of the cave's Chinese name. It supposedly derives from lobsters who lived there over a century ago that were driven out by the island's residents during a night raid.

== Geology ==
The cave is limestone and coral, surrounded by coral reefs, potholes, and gullies. It is accessible at low tide.

== See also ==
- Geology of Taiwan
- Black Dwarf & Beauty Caves
