= Liuqiu Island =

Island of Pingtung County, Taiwan

Native name: 琉球嶼
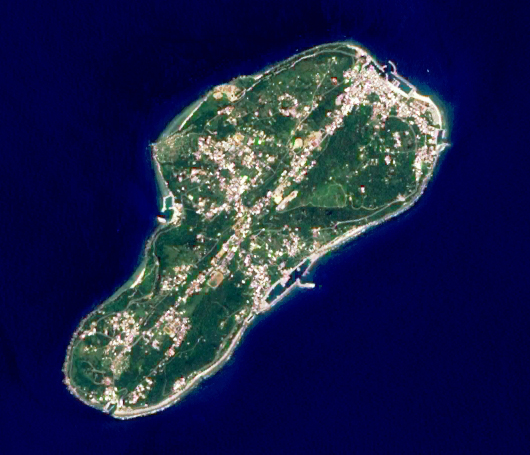
- Satellite image of Liuqiu

- Liuqiu Island in Taiwan

Geography
- Location: Taiwan Strait
- Coordinates: 22°20′19.12″N 120°22′11.34″E
- Area: 6.8 km^{2} (2.6 sq mi)
- Highest elevation: 34 m (112 ft)

Administration
- Republic of China
- Township: Liuqiu
- County: Pingtung
- Province: Taiwan (streamlined)

Demographics
- Population: 12,273 (February 2024)

Additional information
- Official website: liuqiu.pthg.gov.tw

Liuqiu Island

Chinese name
- Chinese: 琉球
Transcriptions
Standard Mandarin
- Hanyu Pinyin: Liúqiú
- Wade–Giles: Liu-ch'iu

Xiaoliuqiu
- Chinese: 小琉球
- Literal meaning: Little Liuqiu
Transcriptions
Standard Mandarin
- Hanyu Pinyin: Xiǎoliúqiú
- Wade–Giles: Hsiao-liu-ch‘iu
- Tongyong Pinyin: Siǎoliúqiú
Hakka
- Pha̍k-fa-sṳ: Séu-liù-khiù
Southern Min
- Hokkien POJ: Sió-liû-khiû

Japanese name
- Kanji: 琉球
- Hiragana: りゅうきゅう
Transcriptions
- Romanization: Ryūkyū

Liuqiu (Chinese: 琉球嶼; also known by other names) is a coral island in the Taiwan Strait about 13 kilometers (8 mi) southwest of the main island of Taiwan. It has an area of 6.8 km^{2} (2.6 sq mi) and approximately 12,200 residents. It is administered as a township of Pingtung County in Taiwan Province, Republic of China. As of 2019 the township's chief is Chen Lung-chin.

== Names ==
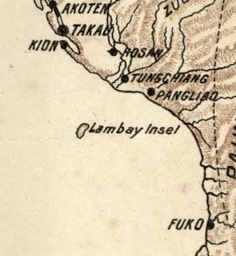
"Lambay" on a 1905 German map

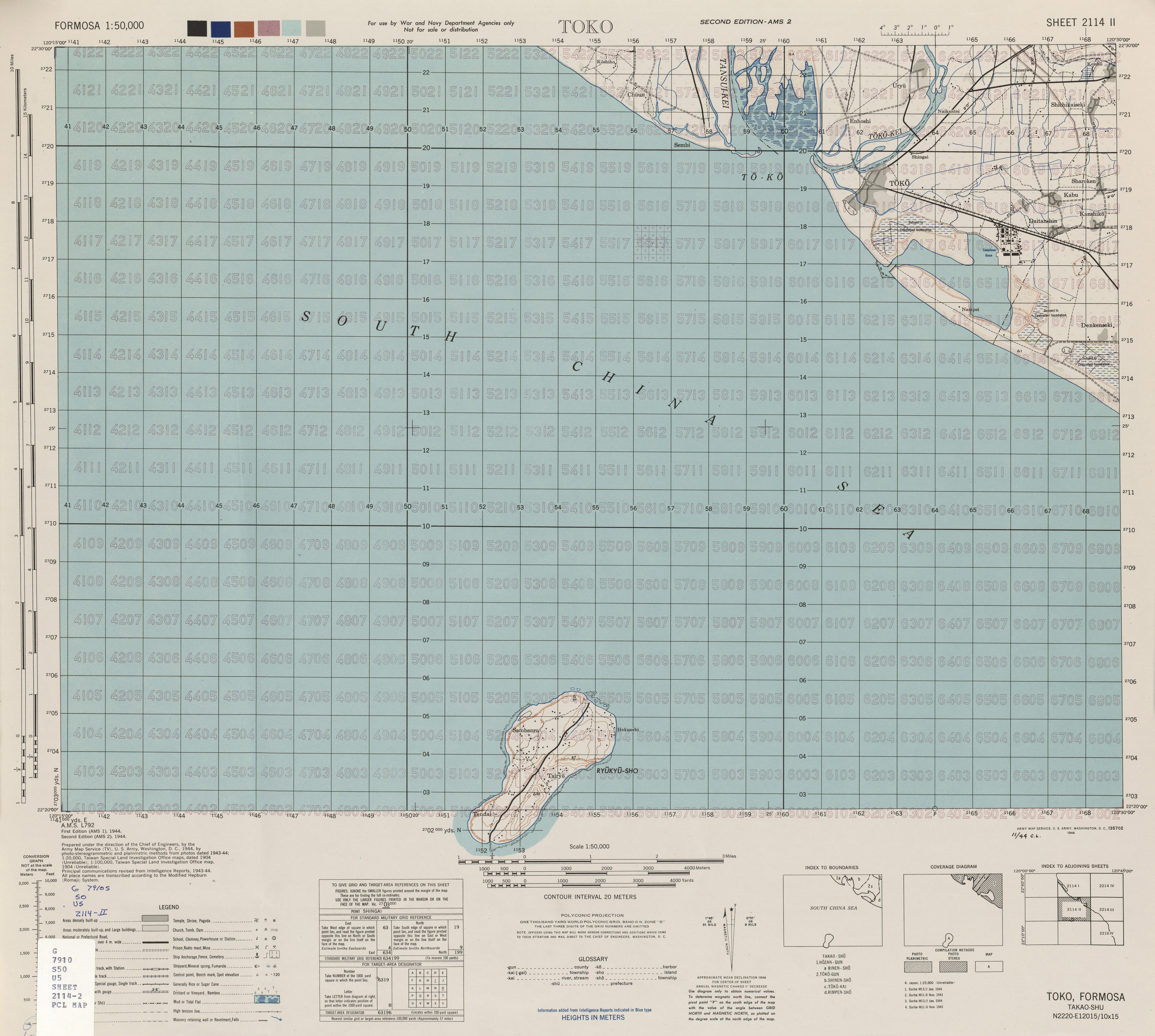
Map including Liuqiu Island (labeled as RYŪKYŪ-SHO) (AMS, 1944)

Liúqiú is the pinyin romanisation of the Mandarin pronunciation of the Chinese name 琉球. Other romanisations include Liouciou, Liuchiu, Liu-chiu, and Liu-ch'iu based on the Wade-Giles system for Mandarin and Ryūkyū from its Japanese pronunciation. The original Liuqiu appears in the Book of Sui and other medieval Chinese records as an island kingdom somewhere in the East China Sea. It was written by different authors with different homophonous characters and appears to have transcribed a native name. That kingdom has been variously identified with states on Taiwan Island, Okinawa, and the Penghu Islands. The name Liuqiu Islet (琉球嶼; Liúqiú Yǔ) was first used during the Ming Dynasty. Since "Ryūkyū" is also the name of the nearby Ryukyu archipelago including Okinawa and a historical kingdom there, the island has also been nicknamed "Little Liuqiu" (小琉球; Xiǎo Liúqiú) as opposed to "Big Liuqiu" (大琉球) for the Ryukyu Islands or Taiwan – since the early 20th century. Transcriptions of the nickname include Xiao Liuqiu, Siaoliouciou, and Sio Liu-khiu.

The island was previously known in English and other European languages as Lambay, Lamay, or Lamey Island. It is thought to be a transcription of a name from one of the Taiwanese aboriginal languages. Other indigenous names were Samaji and Tugin.

It was occasionally also known as Golden Lion Island, a calque of its old Dutch name Gouden Leeuwseylant. The city's tourism department ascribes the name to Vase Rock's supposed resemblance to a lion, but it actually honours the slaughtered crew of the Gouden Leeuw.

== History ==
The Siraya, the Taiwanese indigenous peoples who also lived in nearby Pingtung County on Taiwan Island, are thought to have been the island's original inhabitants.

In 1622, the Dutch ship Goude Leeuws or Gouden Leeuw (Dutch for "Golden Lion") hit the island's coral reefs. Its entire crew was massacred by the island's natives. In 1631, the Dutch yacht Beverwijck wrecked on the same reefs and its fifty-odd survivors battled for two days before also being slaughtered to a man. Hendrik Brouwer, the governor-general of the Dutch East Indies, personally ordered his lieutenant on Taiwan Hans Putmans to "punish and exterminate the people of... the Golden Lion Island as an example for their murderous actions committed against our people." A 1633 expedition under Claes Bruijn discovered it was undermanned for the task and accomplished little, aside from finding the large cave on the island used by its natives as shelter in times of trouble. A larger expedition under Jan Jurriansz van Lingga in 1636 corralled the locals into it, sealed its entrances, and filled its air with burning pitch and sulphur for eight days. By the end of the "Lamey" or Liuqiu Island Massacre, about 300 were killed and 323 were enslaved, the men being sold to plantations on Taiwan and Indonesia and the women and children being used as wives or domestics on Taiwan.

The first Han inhabitant is variously described as a Fujianese fisherman surnamed Chen, sometimes said to have arrived by accident during a storm in the same year as the massacre, or as Li Yuelao, who supposedly "discovered" and developed the island after Koxinga overthrew the Dutch in 1662. The few remaining native inhabitants were picked off by further slave raids and assaults until 1645, when a Chinese merchant who leased the island from the Dutch removed the last 13 indigenous inhabitants. It was resettled by the Chinese, who erected a prosperous fishing village, but only had about 200 inhabitants at the end of Qing control in 1895.

During the Japanese occupation of Taiwan following the First Sino-Japanese War, the island was administered as a village of the Tōkō District of Takao Prefecture.

After the Republic of China resumed control in 1945, the island became a township of Pingtung County within Taiwan Province, which became streamlined in 1998.

Liuqiu transitioned to a tourism-based economy in the early 21st century, particularly following its inclusion in the Dapeng Bay National Scenic Area in 2004. It now receives hundreds of thousands of tourists a year, although this brings new challenges. In early 2015, more than 850 metric tons (840 long tons; 940 short tons) of garbage piled up on the island when the county government forgot to budget funds to transport it to Taiwan Island for incineration. The island was left without disposal services from January to May, when it was finally able to draw on a national subsidy to correct the problem. Similarly, refuse from tourists and fishermen killed over 90% of the island's coral before conservation efforts began to reverse the trend.

== Geography ==
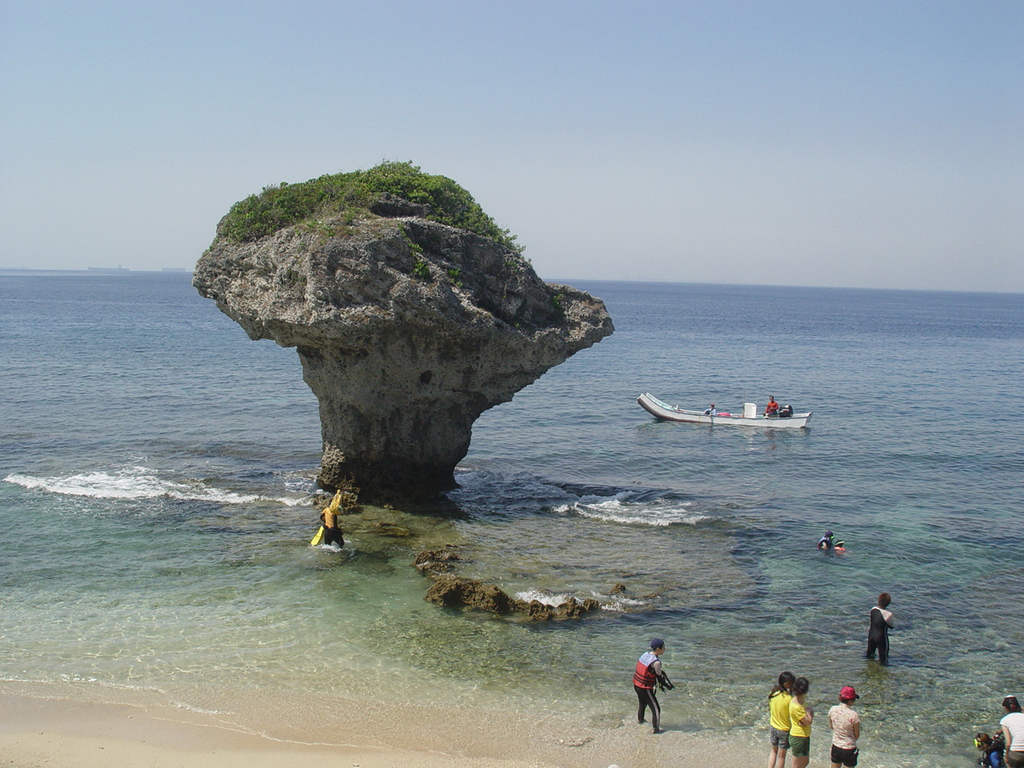
Vase Rock

Liuqiu Island (pink) and the southern end of Taiwan, with the rest of Pingtung County in yellow

Liuqiu Island is a foot- or boot-shaped coral island covering 6.8 square kilometers (2.6 sq mi) at high tide and about 7.4 km^{2} (2.9 sq mi) at low tide, running about 4 kilometers (2.5 mi) north to south and 2 kilometers (1.2 mi) east to west. It lies in the southeast corner of the Taiwan Strait, about 8 nautical miles (15 km; 9 mi) SSW of Donggang at the mouth of the Gaoping River on the southwestern shore of Taiwan Island. Overall, the island inclines gently from the southwest to the northeast, but consists of two grabens—one NE to SW, the other NW to SE—that meet in the middle, dividing the island into four terraces. Its highest point is Belly Hill, about 80 meters (260 ft) above sea level.

Liuqiu is the only island township in Pingtung County. It is one of Taiwan's largest coral islands, and the only one with significant population and human activities. It is also covered with limestone and land coloured red by weathered iron oxide and silicon oxide. Its beaches, reefs, caves and eroded rock formations have become tourist attractions. Its principal beaches are Chungau Beach (t 中澳沙灘, s 中澳沙滩, Zhōng'ào Shātān) on the north shore and Duozaiping (t 肚仔坪潮間帶, s 肚仔坪潮间带, Dǔzǎipíng Cháojiāndài) and Geban Bay on the west shore. The most important of the island's caves are Black Dwarf Cave, Beauty Cave, and Lobster Cave. The most famous rocks are Vase Rock at the north end of the island, the Sanfu Ecological Corridor (t 杉褔生態廊道, s 杉褔生态廊道, Shānfù Shēngtài Lángdào) on the east coast, and the Houshi Fringing Reef (厚石裙礁, Hòushí Qúnjiāo) in the southeast, which includes Mouse Rock (老鼠石, Lǎoshǔ Shí), Guanyin Rock (t 觀音石, s 观音石, Guānyīn Shí), Indian Rock (t 紅蕃石, s 红蕃石, Hóngfān Shí), and Climbing Tiger Rock (爬山虎, Páshānhǔ) in the southeast.

Its forests include white popinac, acacia, wild pineapple (lintou), and bamboo.

=== Wildlife ===
Liuqiu has a diverse ecosystem. Chung Au Beach, a shell-sand beach, abuts waters that are home to approximately 176 species of fish and numerous coral species. It is also home to young and adult green sea turtles, with adult females coming ashore to nest during the summer months. Marine vertebrates such as sharks, flying fish, sea turtles, and cetaceans such as sperm whales may appear around the island.

=== Climate ===
Overall, Liuqiu has a dry and warm climate but is the most typhoon-prone of the Taiwanese islands. It has a tropical monsoon climate (Am), with warm temperatures year round with a rainy or monsoon season from April to October and a dry season with cooler temperatures from November to March. The rainiest recorded month was one June (2,657 mm or 104.6 in); the driest, one December (1.9 mm or 0.075 in).

Climate data for Liuqiu Island (2014–2023 normals, extremes 2000–present)
Month	Jan	Feb	Mar	Apr	May	Jun	Jul	Aug	Sep	Oct	Nov	Dec	Year
Record high °C (°F)	31.7 (89.1)	32.1 (89.8)	33.2 (91.8)	34.4 (93.9)	35.6 (96.1)	35.7 (96.3)	37.4 (99.3)	36.9 (98.4)	35.8 (96.4)	35.3 (95.5)	33.7 (92.7)	32.3 (90.1)	37.4 (99.3)
Mean daily maximum °C (°F)	24.9 (76.8)	25.8 (78.4)	28.2 (82.8)	30.2 (86.4)	31.8 (89.2)	32.6 (90.7)	32.9 (91.2)	31.9 (89.4)	32.5 (90.5)	31.2 (88.2)	29.2 (84.6)	25.8 (78.4)	29.8 (85.6)
Daily mean °C (°F)	20.3 (68.5)	21.0 (69.8)	23.1 (73.6)	25.4 (77.7)	27.3 (81.1)	28.5 (83.3)	28.8 (83.8)	27.9 (82.2)	28.0 (82.4)	26.6 (79.9)	24.7 (76.5)	21.6 (70.9)	25.3 (77.5)
Mean daily minimum °C (°F)	17.3 (63.1)	17.7 (63.9)	19.9 (67.8)	22.3 (72.1)	24.5 (76.1)	25.7 (78.3)	25.8 (78.4)	25.2 (77.4)	25.1 (77.2)	23.8 (74.8)	21.9 (71.4)	18.8 (65.8)	22.3 (72.2)
Record low °C (°F)	7.7 (45.9)	10.8 (51.4)	9.8 (49.6)	16.6 (61.9)	19.2 (66.6)	22.9 (73.2)	22.9 (73.2)	20.9 (69.6)	22.2 (72.0)	19.3 (66.7)	15.5 (59.9)	11.9 (53.4)	7.7 (45.9)
Average precipitation mm (inches)	17.6 (0.69)	13.3 (0.52)	24.0 (0.94)	52.0 (2.05)	156.6 (6.17)	316.4 (12.46)	287.4 (11.31)	443.0 (17.44)	195.8 (7.71)	51.6 (2.03)	34.3 (1.35)	23.9 (0.94)	1,615.9 (63.61)
Average precipitation days	3.2	2.8	3.4	5.3	9.5	13.4	12.4	15.0	10.8	5.8	2.9	3.1	87.6
Average relative humidity (%)	79.8	79.6	79.6	80.7	85.7	86.8	85.7	89.9	86.6	85.1	83.8	81.4	83.7
Source 1: Central Weather Administration
Source 2: Atmospheric Science Research and Application Databank (precipitation 1996–2020, precipitation days and humidity 2000–2024)

Average sea temperature of Liuqiu
Jan	Feb	Mar	Apr	May	Jun	Jul	Aug	Sep	Oct	Nov	Dec	Year
25.0 °C (77.0 °F)	25.2 °C (77.4 °F)	25.7 °C (78.3 °F)	26.9 °C (80.4 °F)	28.1 °C (82.6 °F)	29.1 °C (84.4 °F)	29.4 °C (84.9 °F)	29.2 °C (84.6 °F)	28.8 °C (83.8 °F)	28.1 °C (82.6 °F)	27.0 °C (80.6 °F)	25.8 °C (78.4 °F)	27.4 °C (81.3 °F)

== Administration ==
The current township chief is Chen Lung-chin (t 陳隆進, s 陈隆进, Chén Lóngjìn).

Liuqiu Township consists of 8 villages, with the township seat located in Zhongfu Village.

Liuqiu Township Administrative Divisions

== Economy ==
In the early modern era and under the Japanese, Liuqiu's residents were mostly occupied with fishing and small-scale agriculture. After the restoration of Chinese control in 1945, some quarries were opened to export stone and lime. As Taiwan's economy has improved, tourism has employed more and more people.

Water and electricity are provided from Taiwan Island. Because of the constant threat of summer typhoons, construction on the island is now specially designed to accommodate strong winds and waves.

=== Fishing ===
The traditional mainstay of the local economy has been fishing in the rich waters of the nearby Kuroshio Current. Most residents still make their living by fishing, but the better pay catering to tourists has caused it to run short of manpower. The trade is increasingly reliant on foreign sailors brought in to crew local boats and on cage aquaculture (t 箱網養殖, s 箱网养殖, xiāngwǎng yǎngzhí), the latter of which is also used as a tourist attraction.

=== Agriculture ===
The lack of rivers on the island and infertile ground makes farming difficult. Early on, the main products came from local coconut palms. After 1945, the islands' farmers focused on sweet potatoes and peanuts. Presently, production on the island's 140 hectares (350 acres) of farmland has shifted to mangos and other fruits, including papayas, guavas, and rose apples.

The overall climate is only suitable for dryness-tolerant crops, but the island's exposure to the monsoon and typhoons make even those high-risk. As such, cultivated land has been decreasing since at least 1980 and old fields have been given up to scrubland and forest. The island's agricultural association has focused on high-margin, fast-turnover fruit instead, particularly mangos.

=== Tourism ===
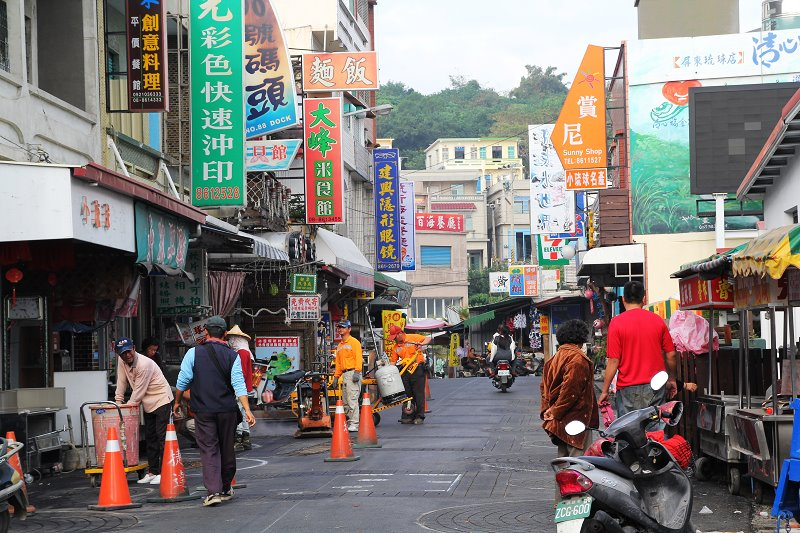
Sanmin Old Street

The sea temperature of the island is above 25 °C (77 °F) year round, allowing many species of coral reefs to inhabit the area and making it one of the best locations for winter swimming activities in Taiwan. Tourism became a mainstay of Liuqiu's economy in the 21st century. After it was included in the Dapeng Bay National Scenic Area in 2004, it gained media exposure and advertised until it was one of Pingtung County's main sightseeing locations. Home to less than 15,000 residents, the island saw over 500,000 tourists in 2012 and over 400,000 in 2014. B&Bs and hotels now cover the island, while others rent bicycles and motorcycles or facilitate scuba certification and diving.

The island's main sights are its temples; its beaches, reefs, caves, and rock formations; its net cages for fishing; the bamboo forest and wetland park (t 竹林生態濕地公園, s 竹林生态湿地公园, Zhúlín Shēngtài Shīdì Gōngyuán) in the center of the island; the architecture and shops along Sanmin Road 三民老街, Sānmín Lǎojiē); the Sanfu Fishing Port (t 杉福漁港, s 杉福渔港, Shānfú Yúgǎng); the Sea View Pavilion (望海亭, Wànghǎi Tíng) beside Beauty Cave, Restoration Pavilion (t 復育涼亭, s 复育凉亭, Fùyù Liángtíng) on a reclaimed landfill on the east coast, and Sunset Pavilion (落日亭, Luòrì Tíng) on the island's southwest corner; and Sanzu or Wild Boar Ditch (t 山豬溝, s 山猪沟, Shānzhū Gōu), a steep gully northwest of Sanban'ao near Black Dwarf Cave.

The Taiwanese government has restricted access and set daily limits for visitors at the islands' intertidal zones since 2012. The increased control has helped restore the areas' ecosystems and biological diversity in the years since.

== Religion ==
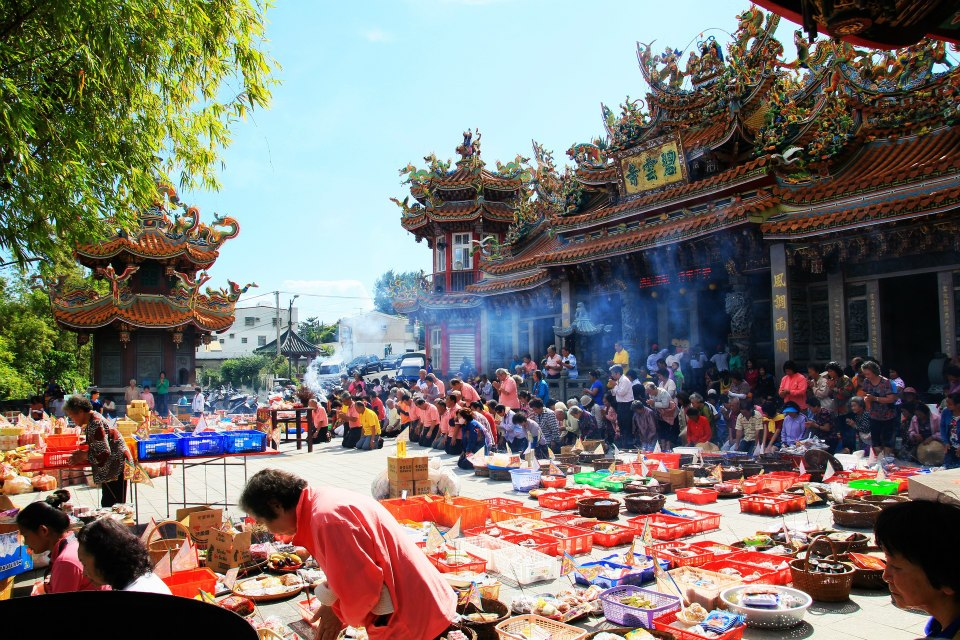
The Biyun Temple during Taiwan's Ghost Festival

Chinese ancestral veneration is abundantly demonstrated, with most plots of undeveloped land on the southern half of the island outside the tourist areas covered with graves. Regulations established by Taiwan's Ministry of the Interior usually prohibit burials within 500 meters (1,600 ft) of a residence, but complying to this particular law on Liuqiu Island would be impossible.

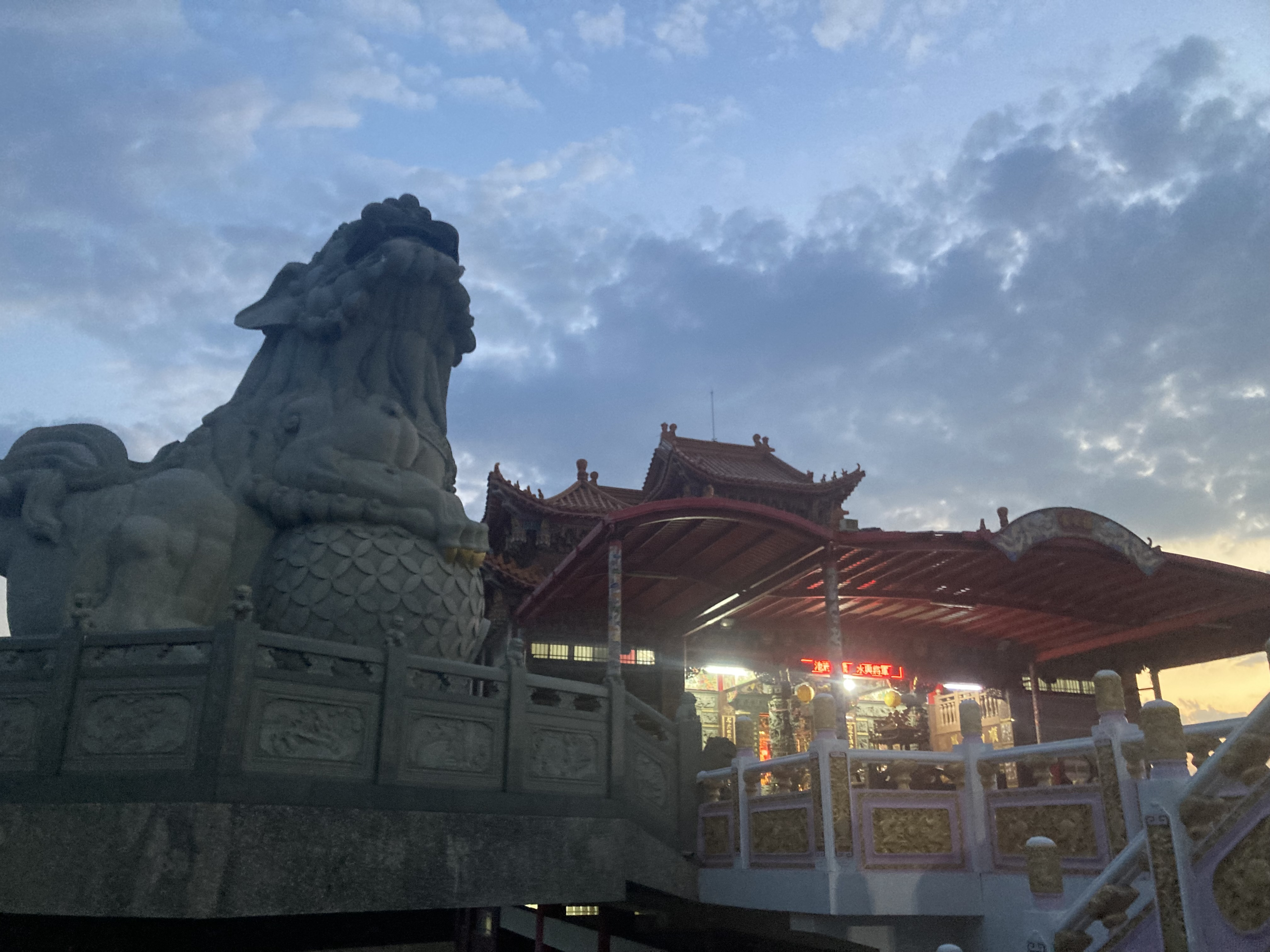
Shangshan Fuan Temple

Liuqiu is famed for its many temples: at least 38 main ones and as many as 70 in total. The people are quite religious and it is common to pray and give offerings for recovery from illness; for blessings for new ships, houses, and marriages; for protection while fishing; and for appropriate times for funerals.

The deities worshipped on the island are mostly those of the local faiths of Quanzhou and Zhangzhou in Fujian, whence the original Han settlers originated. The most important and popular is Guanyin, the Buddhist Bodhisattva of Compassion. Her Jade Cloud Temple (t 碧雲寺, s 碧云寺, Bìyún Sì) and her annual birthday festival on the 19th day of the 2nd lunar month are likewise the main ones on the island. The birthday festivities are celebrated at temples in every village, with ceremonies and Taiwanese opera performances in her honour performed for about a month and a half. This has become a major tourist draw, as has the still larger "Welcoming the King" festival held every three years in honour of the plague subduer deity, Lord Wu.

Two other important temples are Spirit Mountain Temple (t 靈山寺, s 灵山寺, Língshān Sì) on a cliff beside Baisha Port, built in the early 1960s and primarily dedicated to Lord Buddha, and the Palace of the Three Prosperous Ones (t 三隆宮, s 三隆宫, Sānlóng Gōng) south of Benfu Village and dedicated to Lord Zhu, Lord Chi and Lord Wu. Erlong Temple in Haizikou is also a common waypoint used by tourists following the ring road along the island's coast.

Christianity was introduced by the Dutch. There is still a Presbyterian church on the island, begun by English missionaries who also once operated a sanitarium on the island. Spanish Catholicism and Japanese Shintoism and Buddhism were introduced by their respective empires but have since died out.

== Transport ==
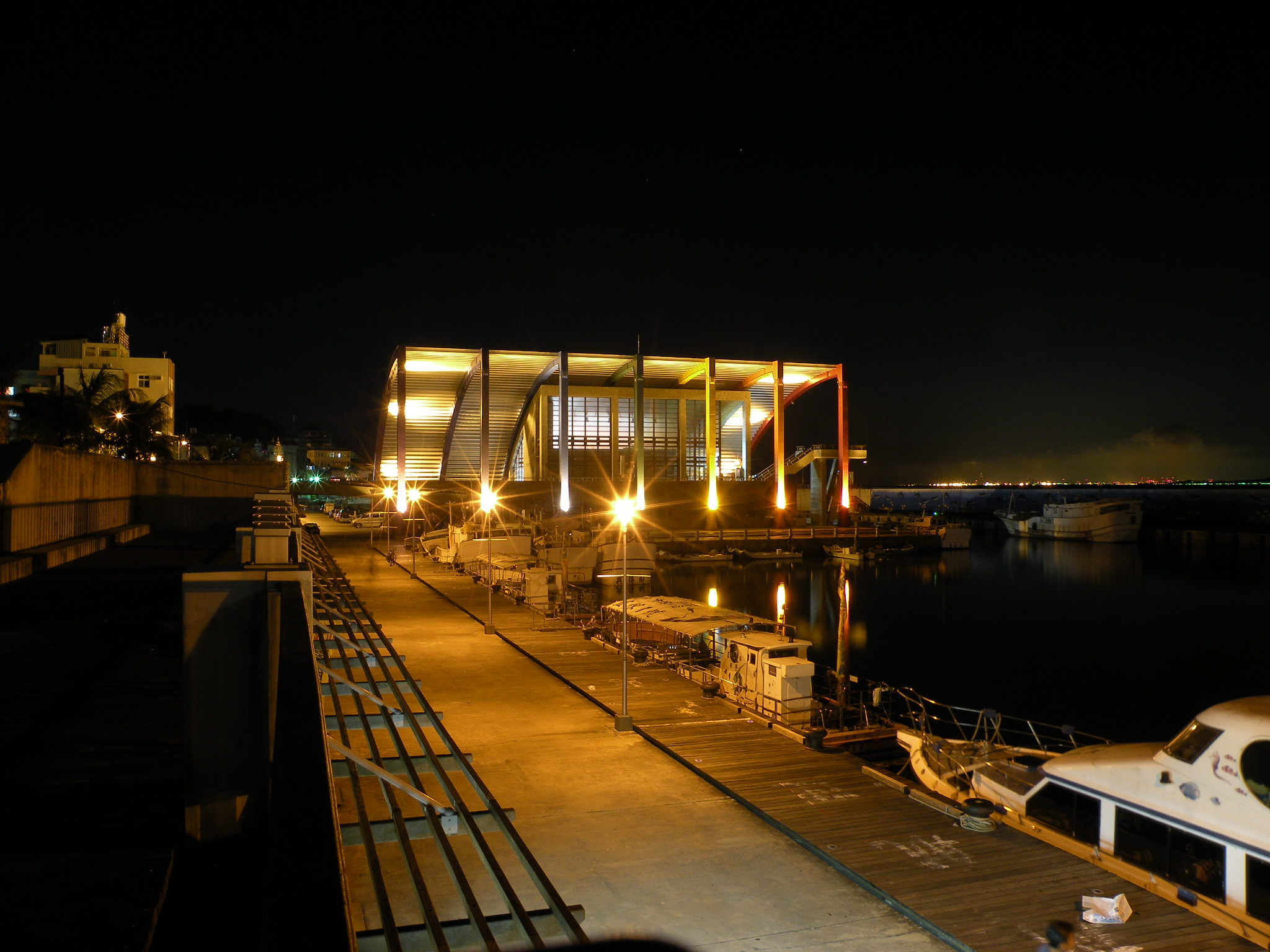
Baisha Port, one of two ports on Liuqiu

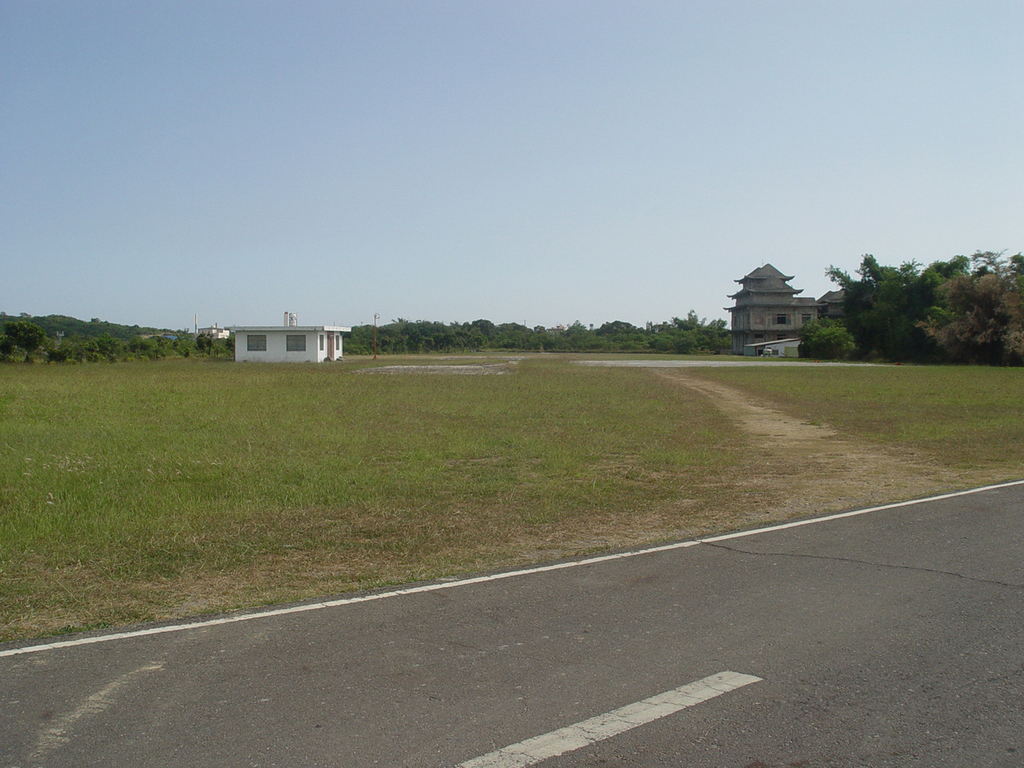
Liuqiu Airport

The only public transport to Liuqiu is by ship from Donggang Harbor and Yanpu Harbor in Pingtung County on Taiwan Island. Boats arrive at Baisha Port on the north end of the island or Dafu Port on its east coast. The island is 8–9 nautical miles (15–17 km; 9.2–10.4 mi) from the Taiwan mainland, which is about a 25- to 30-minute boat ride, with the fastest boats making the trip in 15 minutes. The island has two lighthouses: one guiding ships into Baisha Port and the White Lighthouse on Mount Dongnanjian.

Although Liuqiu Airport once had passenger service with direct flights between Kaohsiung international airport and the island, it is now only used for helicopters.

== Education ==
The island provides primary and junior high education. Its five schools are Liuqiu, Baisha, Quande, and Tiannan Primary Schools and Liuqiu Junior High School. High school and university students attend schools on Taiwan Island.

A 2004 report on the island described its brain drain before the growth of the tourism industry: "'Liuchiu has two problems... All the young people go over there,' he [said] pointing to Kaohsiung on the horizon, 'and all the old people go over there,'... pointing to the south of the island" and its graves.

== Notable natives ==
- Lee Shu-chuan, Secretary-General of the Kuomintang

== See also ==
- List of islands of Taiwan
- List of islands in the East China Sea
- Lamey Island Massacre
