= Tzu Hui Institute of Technology =

University in Nanzhou, Pingtung County, Taiwan

- 慈惠醫護管理專科學校
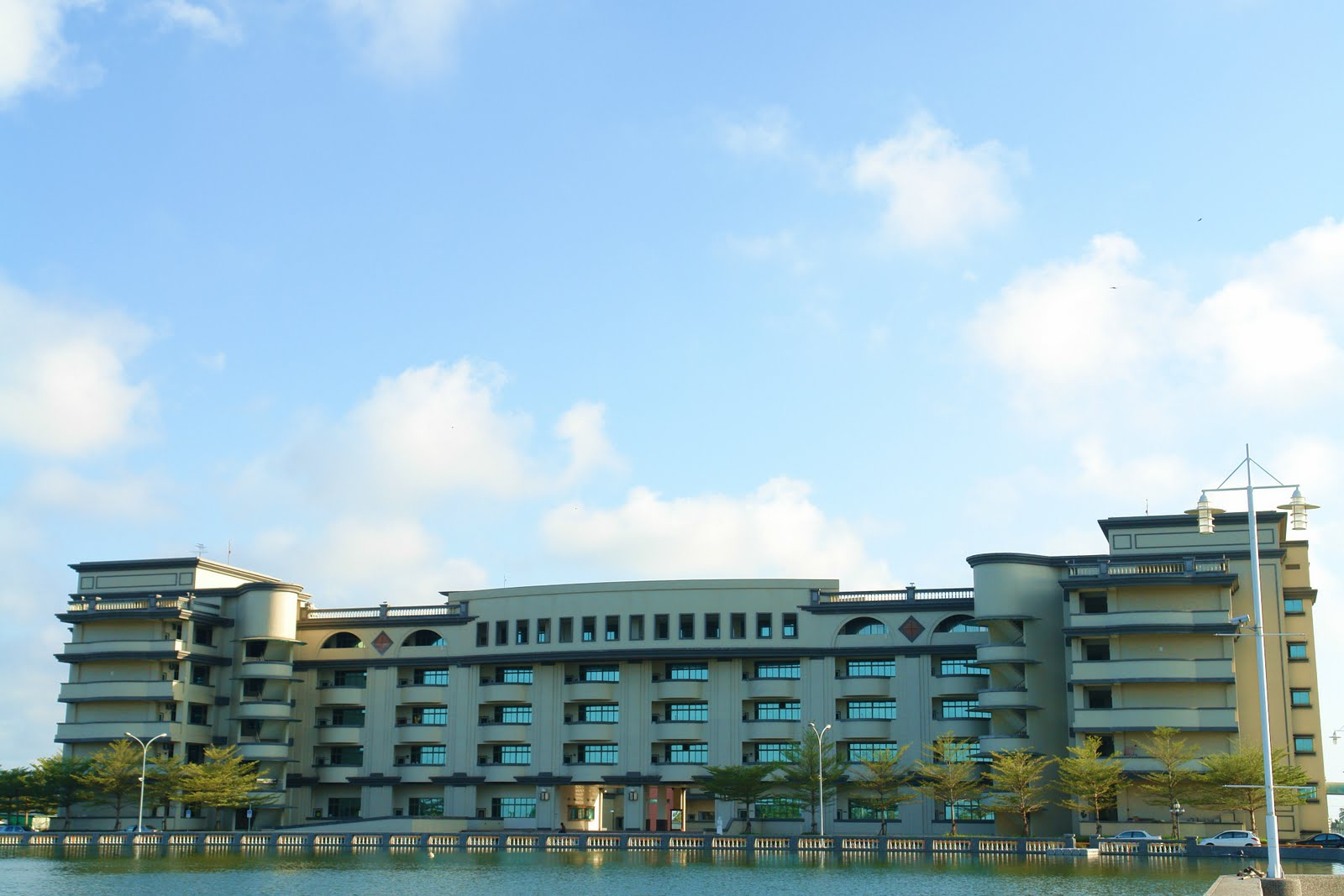
- Established: August 1964
- Founder: Tsai Li-yan
- President: Kuo Elda Shang
- Principal: Hsiao Yaw-hwa
- Location: Nanzhou, Pingtung County, Taiwan; 22°29′09.8″N 120°29′21.9″E
- Website: Official website (in Chinese)

Tzu Hui Institute of Technology (simplified Chinese: 慈惠医护管理专科学校; traditional Chinese: 慈惠醫護管理專科學校; pinyin: Cíhuì Yīhù Guǎnlǐ Zhuānkē Xuéxiào; Pe̍h-ōe-jī: Chû-hūi I-hō͘ Koán-lí Choan-kho Ha̍k-hāu) is a private university in Nanzhou Township, Pingtung County, Taiwan.

The institute offers undergraduate and graduate programs in various fields, including engineering, management, design, and humanities.

== History ==
The school was founded as Tzu Hui Vocational School of Nursing and Midwifery in August 1964. In August 2000, the school was upgraded to Tzu Hui Institute of Technology. In 2020, the university had an enrollment rate of less than 60%.

== Faculties ==
- Nursing
- Digital Media Design (Information Management)
- Early Childhood Care and Education
- Physical Therapy (Rehabilitation Technology)
- Leisure, Recreation and Tourism Management
- Styling and Cosmetology
- Food and Beverage Management
- Tourism Affairs

== Campus ==
The university campus building is constructed on a land belonging to Taiwan Sugar Corporation.

== Transportation ==
The school is accessible by bus from Nanzhou Station of Taiwan Railway.

== See also ==
- List of universities in Taiwan
