= Majia, Pingtung =

Mountain indigenous township in Pingtung County, Taiwan

Majia Township 瑪家鄉
- Mountain indigenous township
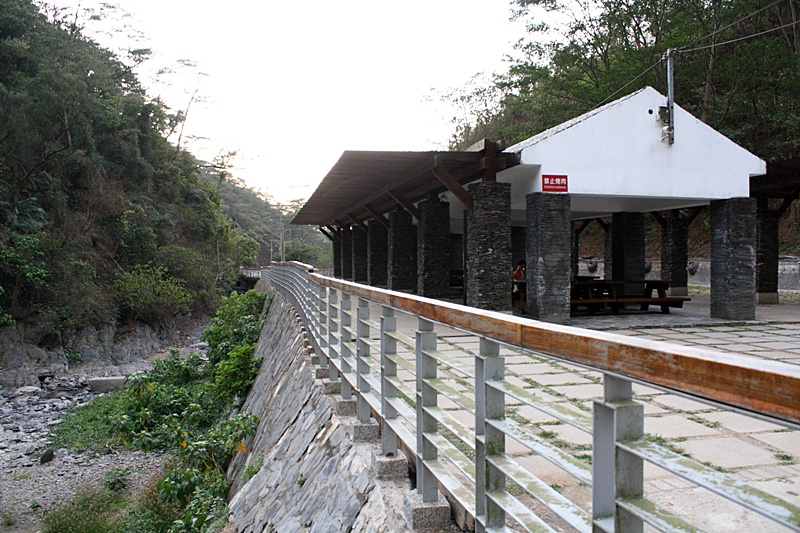

- Majia Township in Pingtung County

- Location within Taiwan
- Coordinates: 22°40′N 120°40′E
- Location: Pingtung County, Taiwan

Area
  - Total: 79 km^{2} (31 sq mi)

Population (February 2024)
  - Total: 6,742
  - Density: 85/km^{2} (220/sq mi)

Majia Township (Chinese: 瑪家鄉; pinyin: Mǎjiā Xiāng) is a mountain indigenous township in Pingtung County, Taiwan. The area is known as Makazayazaya (瑪家雑牙雑牙社) in the Paiwan language, and the Taiwanese mountain pitviper (Ovophis monticola makazayazaya) is named after it. The main population is the indigenous Paiwan people.

== History ==
During the Japanese era, Majia was grouped with modern-day Sandimen Township and Wutai Township as "Aboriginal Area" (蕃地), which was governed under the Heitō District (屏東郡) of Takao Prefecture.

== Geography ==
The township has an area of 78.7 square kilometres (30.4 sq mi), and a population of 6,742 people (February 2024).

== Administrative divisions ==
The township comprises six villages: Beiye, Jiayi, Liangshan, Majia, Paiwan and Sanhe.

== Tourist attractions ==
- Taiwan Indigenous Peoples Cultural Park
