= Taiwan Indigenous Peoples Cultural Park =

Cultural center in Majia, Pingtung County, Taiwan

- 台灣原住民文化園區
- Interactive map of Taiwan Indigenous Peoples Cultural Park
- Location: Majia, Pingtung County, Taiwan
- Coordinates: 22°42′25.7″N 120°39′08.4″E
- Type: cultural center

Construction
- Opened: 1987

A model of an Atayal man using a trap, Beiye Village, Majia Township, Pingtung County.

The Taiwan Indigenous Peoples Cultural Park (traditional Chinese: 台灣原住民文化園區; simplified Chinese: 台湾原住民文化园区; pinyin: Táiwān Yuán Zhùmín Wénhuà Yuánqū) is a cultural park about Taiwanese aborigines in Beiye Village, Majia Township, Pingtung County, Taiwan.

== History ==
The cultural park was originally established in 1987 as Machia Aboriginal Cultural Village.

== Architecture ==
The cultural park spans over an area of 82.65 hectares. It is divided into four areas, which are welcoming district, Tamaluwan district, Naluwan district and Fuguwan district.

== Exhibitions ==
The cultural park exhibits the lifestyle and cultural heritage of the nine main aboriginal tribes in Taiwan.

== See also ==
- List of tourist attractions in Taiwan
