= Jiaruipu Temple =

Coordinates: 22.8019°N 120.6294°E

The Jiaruipu Temple (Makatao: Garanpu Konkai, Pe̍h-ōe-jī: Ka-la̍h-po͘ Kong-kài, Chinese: 加蚋埔公廨; pinyin: Jiā'nà（ruì）pŭ Gōngxiè; Zhuyin Fuhao: ㄐㄧㄚ ㄋㄚˋ ㄆㄨˇ ㄍㄨㄥ ㄒㄧㄝˋ), also known as the Kanapo Temple, is a Makatao temple in Gaoshu Township, Pingtung County, Taiwan.

== History ==
The temple is in the northeast of Taishan Village, Gaoshu Township, located in a rural region. It is the religious center for the local Makatao people.

On April 16, 2011, the Makatao of Gaoshu, Neipu, and Wanluan conducted a protest at the temple with the goal of lobbying the Republic of China's Council of Indigenous Peoples to recognize them as Plains Aborigines, and established Makatao Association.

=== Name ===
The temple name was 'A-mu House'(阿姆寮), but the Siraya people renamed it to Konkai(公廨).

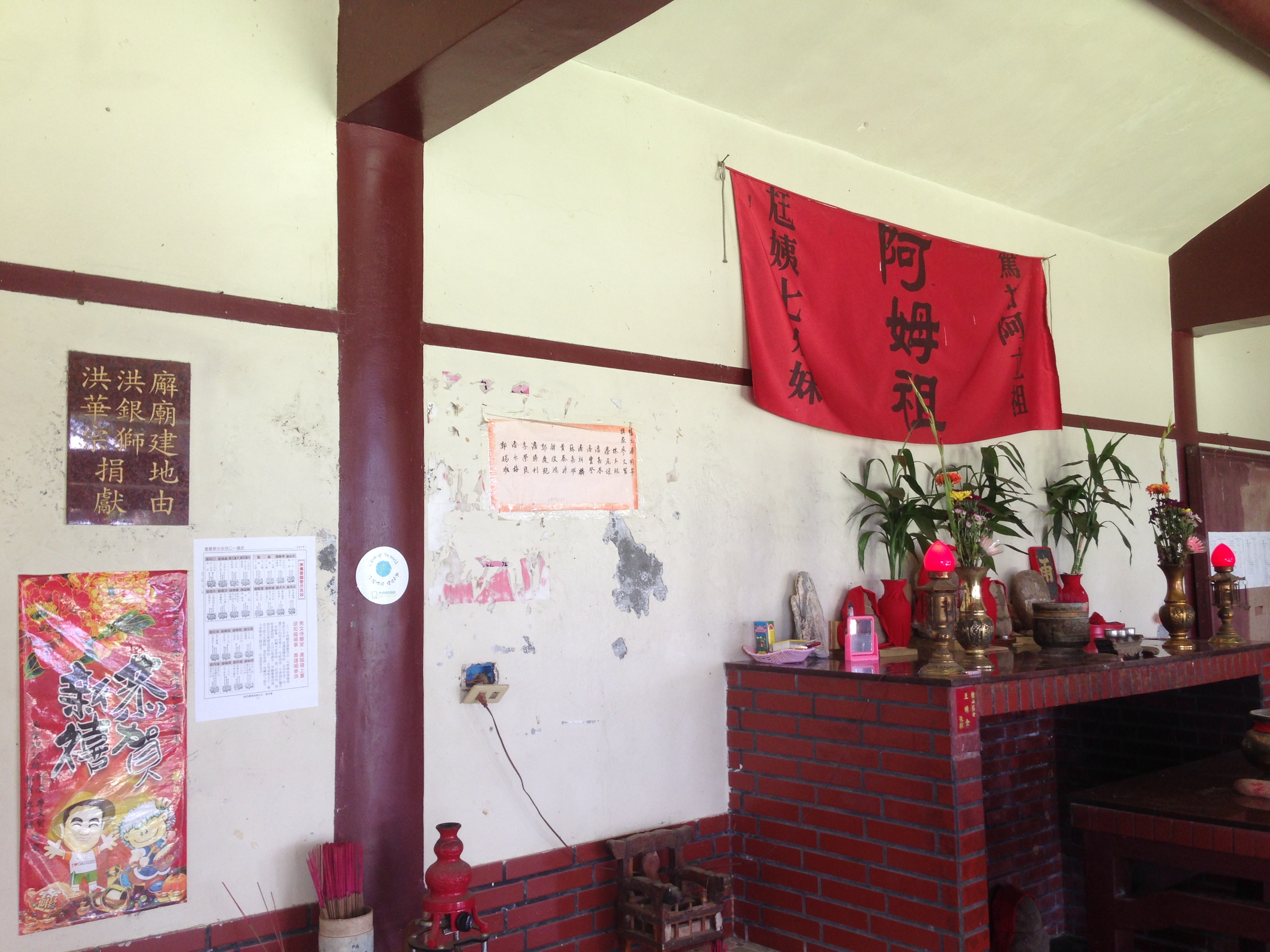
Bulletin board reads: Hong Yinshi and Hong Huazong to the landlord for here.

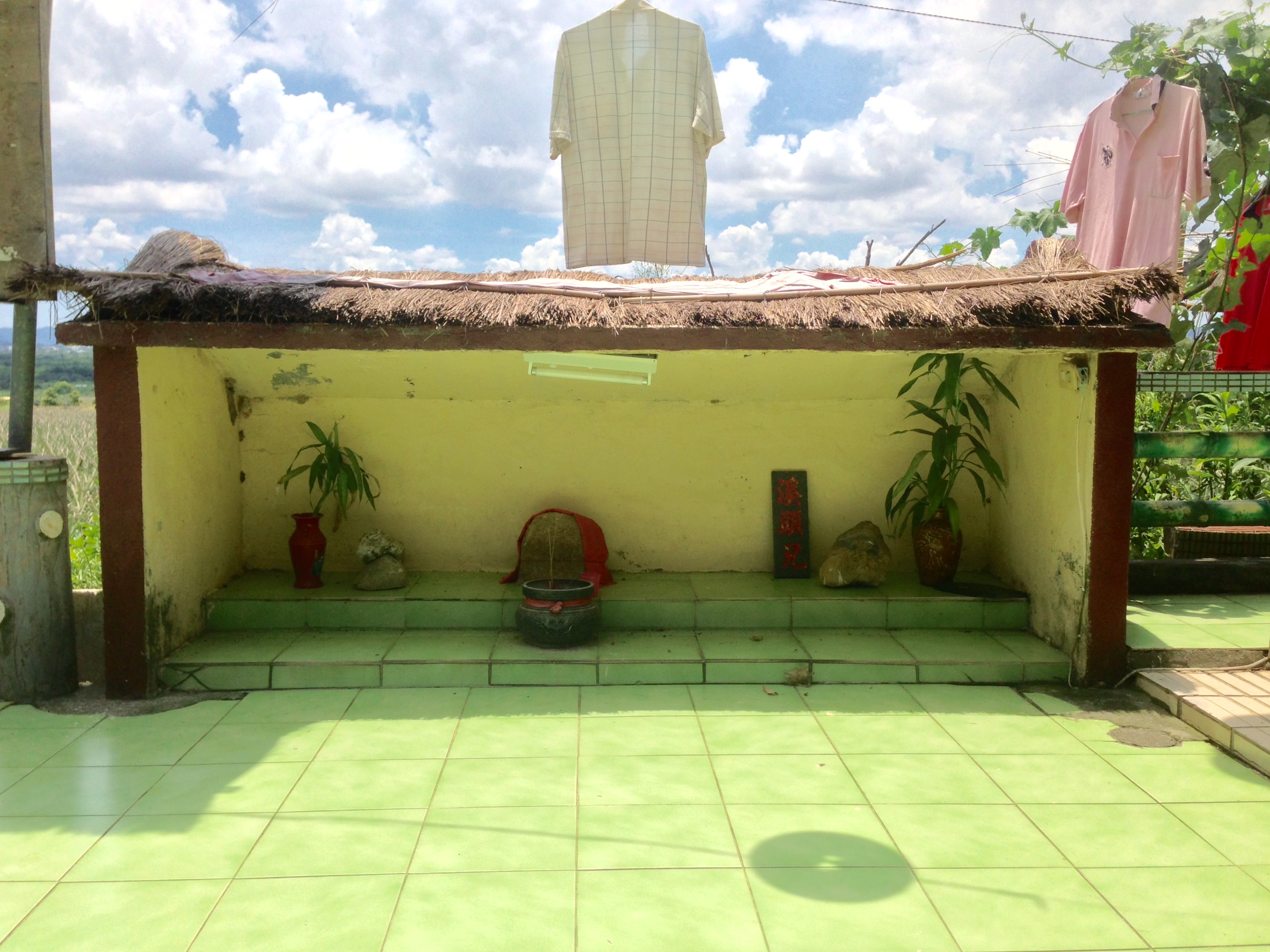
祈雨石

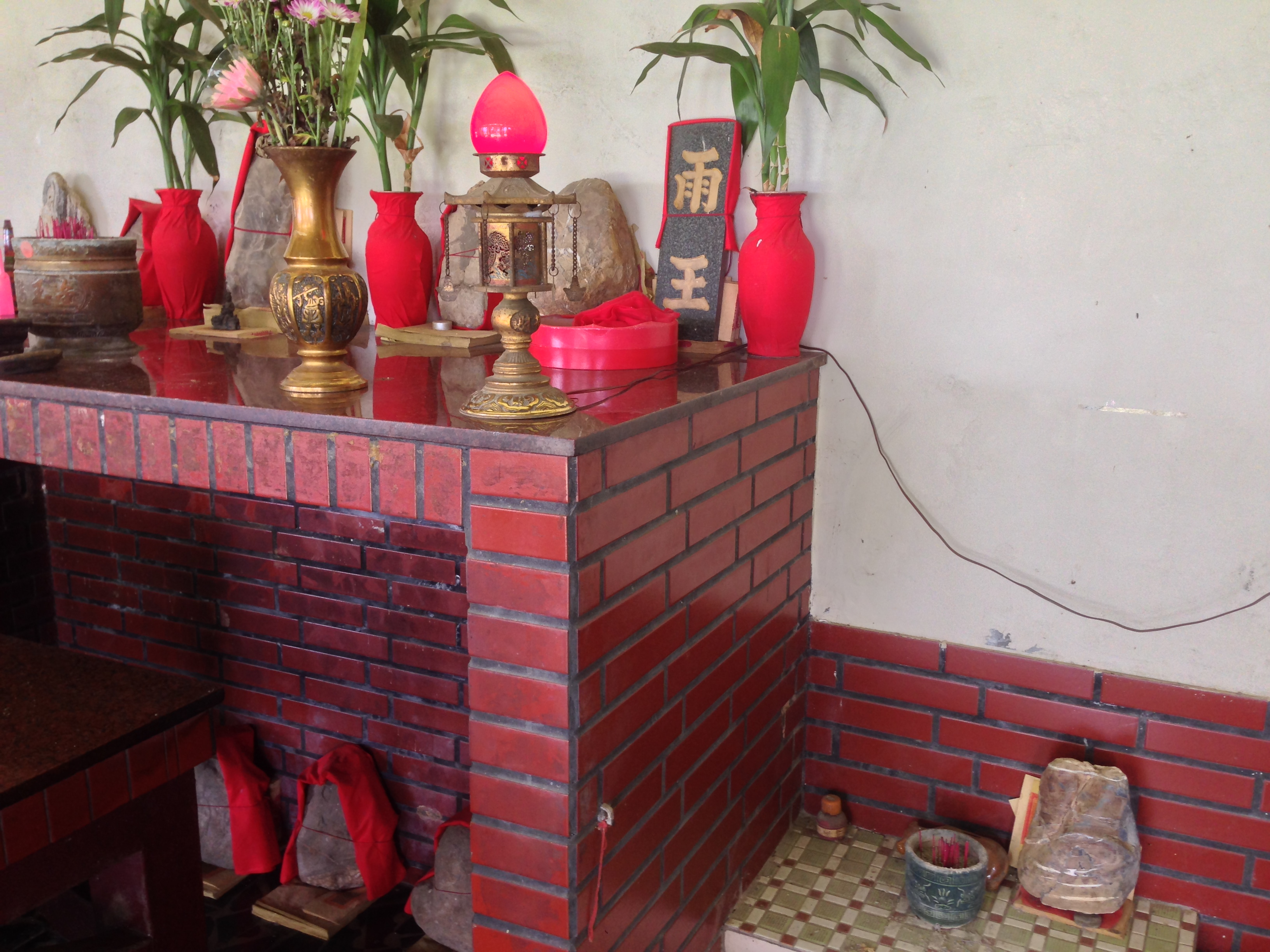
Rain King
