= Gaoshu =

Rural township in Pingtung County, Taiwan

Coordinates: 22.820175°N 120.5979°E

Gaoshu Township 高樹鄉 Takagi
- Rural township
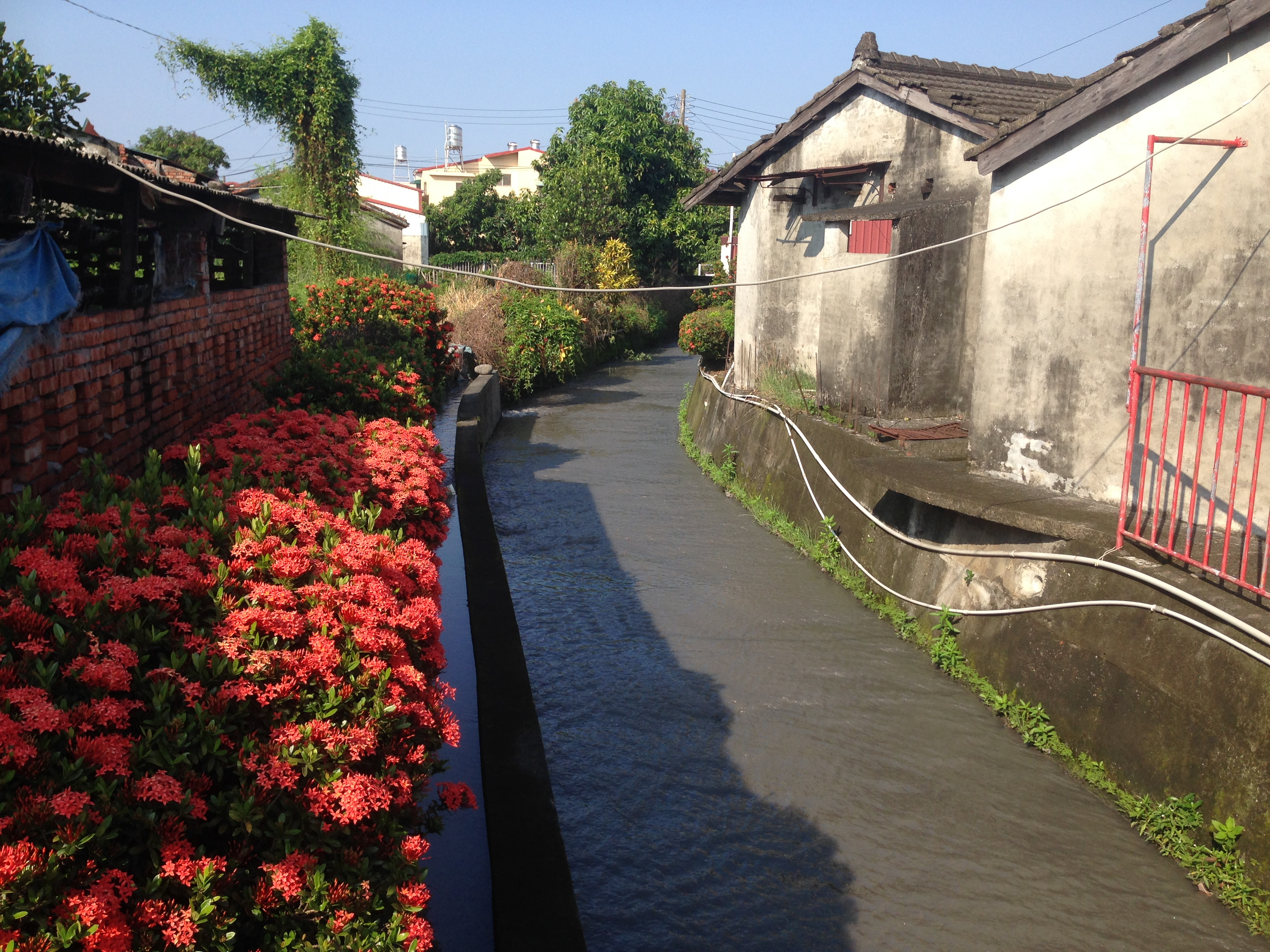

- Gaoshu Township in Pingtung County
- Interactive map of Gaoshu Township 高樹鄉
- Location: Pingtung County, Taiwan

Area
  - Total: 90 km^{2} (35 sq mi)

Population (February 2024)
  - Total: 22,687
  - Density: 250/km^{2} (650/sq mi)

Gaoshu Township
- Traditional Chinese: 高樹鄉
- Hanyu Pinyin: Gāoshù Xiāng
- Wade–Giles: Kao^{1}-shu^{4} Hsiang^{1}
- Pha̍k-fa-sṳ: Kô-su-hiông
- Hokkien POJ: Ko-chhiū-hiong

Gaoshu Township is a rural township in Pingtung County, Taiwan.

== Geography ==
It has an area of 90.15 square kilometres (34.81 sq mi), and, as of February 2024, had a total population of 22,687.

== Administrative divisions ==
Villages in Gaushu Township

The township comprises 19 villages: Cailiao, Dapu, Gaoshu, Guangfu, Guangxing, Jianxing, Jiuliao, Jiuzhuang, Nanhua, Sima, Taishan, Tianzi, Tungxing, Tungzhen, Xinfeng, Xinnan, Yanshu, Yuanquan, and Zhangrong.

== Tourist attractions ==
- Jiaruipu Temple

== Notable natives ==
- Chen Chi-nan, Minister of Council of Cultural Affairs (2004–2006)
- Chung Li-ho, novelist
