= Baisha Port =

Port in Liuqiu, Pingtung County, Taiwan

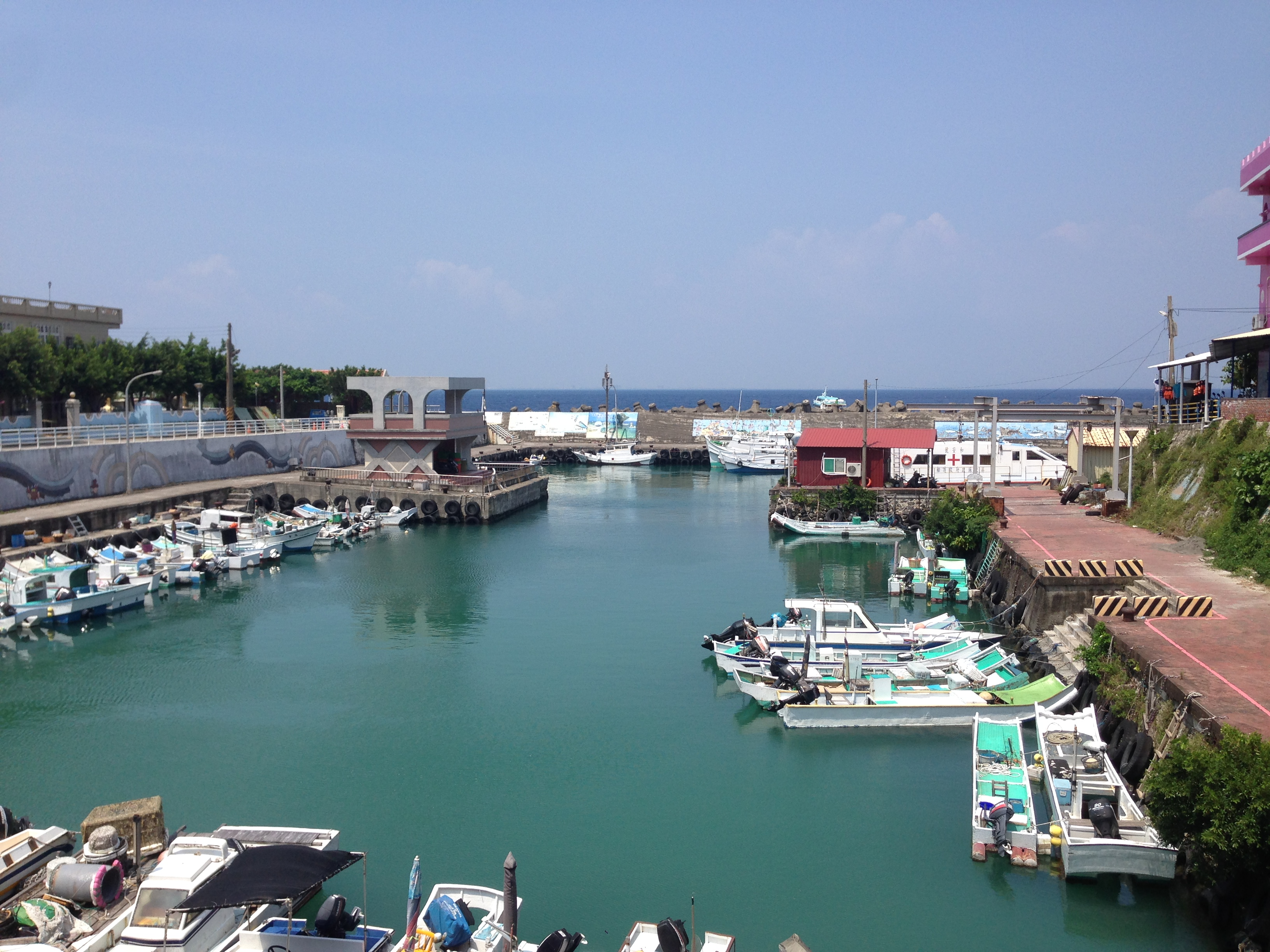
- Interactive map of Baisha Port
- Location within Taiwan
- Native name: 白沙港

Location
- Location: Liuqiu, Pingtung County, Taiwan
- Coordinates: 22°21′11.4″N 120°23′2″E

Details
- Type of Harbor: port

Baisha Port
- Chinese: 白沙港
- Literal meaning: White Sands Harbor
Transcriptions
Standard Mandarin
- Hanyu Pinyin: Báishā Gǎng
- Wade–Giles: Pai-sha Kang

Baisha Tourism Port
- Traditional Chinese: 白沙觀光港
- Simplified Chinese: 白沙观光港
- Literal meaning: White Sands Tourism Harbor
Transcriptions
Standard Mandarin
- Hanyu Pinyin: Báishā Guānguāng Gǎng
- Wade–Giles: Pai-sha Kuan-kuang Kang

The Baisha Port is a port in Liuqiu Township, Pingtung County, Taiwan. It is the main port for people to get in and out from Liuqiu Island.

== Architecture ==
The port is designed with a sail-shaped building with rainbow colors. The port features ticket counter, visitor information center and other boat services, such as tour boats, glass bottom boats etc.

== Destinations ==
The port serves ferries to Donggang Township on the island of Taiwan.

== See also ==
- Transportation in Taiwan
