= Lamey Island Massacre =

Massacre of Taiwanese aboriginals by Dutch soldiers

Coordinates: 22°20′24″N 120°22′19″E

Date	April–May 1636
Location	Liuqiu Island, southwest of the island of Taiwan
Result	Massacre and enslavement of the natives, eventual depopulation of the island

Belligerents
Dutch East India Company	Natives of Liuqiu

Strength
100 Dutch soldiers Unknown number of Formosan allies	Unknown

Casualties and losses
Exact numbers unknown, casualties slight	c. 300 killed 323 captured
- Location of Lamey Island

The Lamey or Liuqiu Island Massacre was the slaughter of aboriginal inhabitants of Liuqiu Island (then known as "Lamey" or "Golden Lion Island") off the coast of Taiwan by Dutch soldiers in 1636. The killings were part of a punitive campaign in retaliation for the massacre of shipwrecked Dutch sailors in two separate incidents in 1622 and 1631 by natives of the island.

== Background ==
Two years before the Dutch East India Company established a presence on Taiwan in 1624, a Dutch ship named the Golden Lion (Dutch: Gouden Leeuw) was wrecked on the coral reefs of Liuqiu Island. The entire crew was killed by the native inhabitants.

Subsequently in 1631 a yacht named the Beverwijck was also wrecked on the treacherous reefs, with survivors (numbering around fifty) battling the Lameyans for two days before being overwhelmed and slaughtered to a man.

Following the murder of the Gouden Leeuw survivors, the island was sometimes referred to by the Dutch as Gouden Leeuwseylant ("Golden Lion Island"). There was a desire at the very highest levels of the Dutch East India Company not to let the killings go unpunished, with Governor-General of the Dutch East Indies Hendrik Brouwer ordering Governor Hans Putmans to "punish and exterminate the people of [...] the Golden Lion Island as an example for their murderous actions committed against our people."

== Punitive expedition campaigns ==
Putmans was determined to assault Liuqiu as soon as possible, at one stage requesting that the warriors of Mattau assist them in punishing the islanders. The first expedition arrived in 1633, led by Claes Bruijn and consisting of 250 Dutch soldiers, forty Han Chinese pirates and 250 Aboriginal Formosans. It met with little success, but they did manage to find evidence of the murdered crew of the Beverwijck, including coins, copper from the ship's galley and a Dutch hat. They also learned that a large cave on the island was used by the natives as a refuge in times of trouble.

In 1636, a larger expedition under Jan Jurriansz van Lingga landed on the island, this time chasing the Lameyans into the cave. The Dutch and their allies proceeded to block up all the entrances, leaving small holes where pans of burning pitch and sulphur were placed. Some of the trapped Lameyans managed to crawl out of the holes, where they were captured by the Dutch force. On May 4, after the poisonous fumes had been constantly produced for eight days (during which the cries of those inside could be clearly heard), the cave grew still and the entrances were unblocked. When soldiers entered to investigate, they found the corpses of around 300 men, women and children who had been suffocated by the fumes.

== Aftermath ==
The captured men of the island were put to work as slaves in both Taiwan and Batavia. The women and children were put up in the homes of Dutch people in Taiwan as servants; some later became wives for Dutch men.

There were numerous other raids following this expedition until the island was finally completely depopulated in 1645 when a Chinese merchant who had rented rights to the island from the Dutch East India Company removed the last thirteen inhabitants.

== Alternate stories ==
There have been a number of erroneous accounts of the incident, the most obvious of which is the plaque outside the cave where the massacre occurred.

It was in 1661 (the 15th year of the Yong Li Ming Dynasty) national hero Koxinga (Cheng Chen-kung, 鄭成功), knighted as Yen Ping King, drove the Dutch and restored Taiwan and the Pescadores (Penghu). During the Dutch escaping, some negroes were separated from their unit and arrived at this island. They lived in this cave. Some years later, a British boat with soldiers landed at the place northeast of the cave. As they were enjoying the scenery, those negroes robbed their food and other things, burned the boat and killed all the British. It was discovered by the British warship that they landed this island and sought the murderers while the negroes hid in the cave. In spite of many threats, they refused to surrender. Finally, the British burned the cave with oil. Then, all the negroes died there in the cave. Later it was named as the Black Spirit Cave, which means the cave in which the foreign negroes had lived before.

This account is almost completely false from start to finish, as noted by several writers.

== See also ==
- Taiwan under Dutch rule
