= Pingtung County =

County of Taiwan

Pingtung County 屏東縣 Pîn-tong County
- County
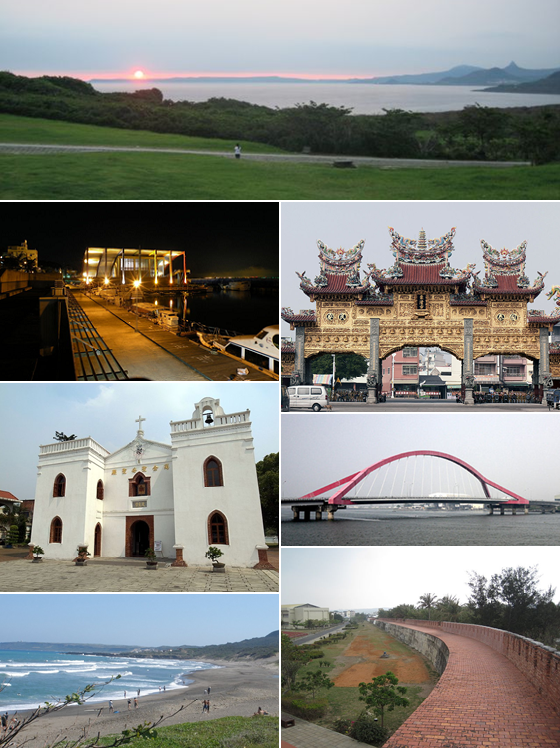
- Left:Sunset view of Erluanbi Light House in Kenting National Park, Baisha Port in Lamay Island, Wanchin Immaculate Conception Church, Jialeshui Beach, Right:Donggang Donglong Temple, Jinde Bridge in Donggang River, Hengchun Ancient City Wall (all item from above to bottom)

- Flag Logo

- Pingtung County in Taiwan
- Coordinates: 22°40′31.78″N 120°29′29.09″E
- Country: Republic of China (Taiwan)
- Province: Taiwan^{a}
- Region: Southern Taiwan
- Seat: Pingtung City
- Largest city: Pingtung City
- Boroughs: 1 cities, 32 (3 urban, 29 rural) townships

Government
  - Body: Pingtung County Government; Pingtung County Council
  - County Magistrate: Chou Chun-mi (DPP)

Area
  - Total: 2,775.6003 km^{2} (1,071.6653 sq mi)
  - Rank: 5 of 22

Population (February 2024)
  - Total: 793,959
  - Rank: 10 of 22
  - Density: 286.049/km^{2} (740.865/sq mi)
- Time zone: UTC+8 (National Standard Time)
- ISO 3166 code: TW-PIF
- Website: www.pthg.gov.tw
- Symbols
- Flower: Hairy Bougainvillea (Bougainvillea brasiliensis)
- Tree: Coconut tree
- ^{a} In Taiwan, provinces remain a nominal division according to the Taiwanese constitution, but are no longer considered to have any administrative function practically.

Pingtung County
- Traditional Chinese: 屏東縣
- Simplified Chinese: 屏东县
Transcriptions
Standard Mandarin
- Hanyu Pinyin: Píngdōng Xiàn
- Bopomofo: ㄆㄧㄥˊ ㄉㄨㄥ ㄒㄧㄢˋ
- Gwoyeu Romatzyh: Pyngdong Shiann
- Wade–Giles: Pʻing²-tung¹ Hsien⁴
- Tongyong Pinyin: Píngdong Siàn
- Yale Romanization: Píngdūng Syàn
- MPS2: Píngdūng Shiàn
- IPA: [pʰǐŋ.tʊ́ŋ ɕjɛ̂n]
Hakka
- Pha̍k-fa-sṳ: Phìn-tûng-yan
Southern Min
- Hokkien POJ: Pîn-tong-koān
- Tâi-lô: Pîn-tong-kuān

Pingtung (Note: In local languages: Traditional Chinese script: 屏東縣; Mandarin Pinyin: Píngdōng Xiàn; Hokkien: Pîn-tong-koān; Sixian Hakka: Phìn-tûng-yan; Paiwan: Akaw/Qakaw) (Wade–Giles: Pʻing²-tung¹) is a county located in southern Taiwan. It has a warm tropical monsoon climate and is known for its agriculture and tourism. Kenting National Park, Taiwan's oldest national park, is located in the county. The county seat is Pingtung City.

== Name ==
The name Pingtung means "east of Banping mountain", referring to a nearby mountain known as Banping mountain (Chinese: 半屏山; Pe̍h-ōe-jī: Pòaⁿ-pêng-soaⁿ).

== History ==
=== Early history ===
Aboriginal inhabitants of Liuqiu Island (13 km [8.1 mi] southwest of Taiwan, and now part of Pingtung County) killed Dutch sailors on two occasions. In response, in the spring of 1636, Dutch sailors carried out a punitive campaign that became known as the Lamey Island Massacre.

Modern-day Pingtung County and Kaohsiung City were part of Banlian-chiu (萬年州; Bān-liân-chiu) during the Kingdom of Tungning (1661–1683) and Fongshan Prefecture (鳳山縣; Hōng-soaⁿ-koān) during Qing dynasty rule (1683–1895).

Until the seventeenth century, this area of Taiwan was a place of exile for Chinese criminals and the occasional landing point for international mariners. Only the settlements near present-day Checheng Township existed. In 1664, the Hakka settlers arrived from mainland China and farmed under a homesteading system introduced by Zheng Jing.

Pingtung City, the biggest city in Pingtung County, also known as "A-Kau" (阿猴; A-kâu, English: the forest), was the home of Taiwanese Plains Aborigines.

In 1684, settlers from China's southern Fujian region created the first Han Chinese villages near Pingtung. By 1734, most of the Pingtung Plain was cultivated, and Pingtung was expanded in 1764. In 1836, the government and locals worked together to build the city's four walls (the North Gate, the East Gate, the West Gate, and the South gate), and the roads were completed.

In March 1867, 14 American sailors were killed near Kenting by local aborigines in the Rover incident, which lead to the failed American Formosa Expedition three months later. In 1871, local aborigines killed 54 sailors from Ryukyu in the Mudan Incident. The Japanese carried out a punitive campaign against the local aborigines in the 1874 Japanese invasion of Taiwan.

=== Empire of Japan ===
Under Japanese rule (1895–1945), Hōzan Subprefecture (Japanese: 鳳山支廳); Pe̍h-ōe-jī: Hōng-soaⁿ Chi-thiaⁿ was initially under Tainan Ken (臺南縣); Pe̍h-ōe-jī: Tâi-lâm-koān, but political divisions frequently changed between 1895 and 1901. In 1901, Akō Chō (阿猴廳); Pe̍h-ōe-jī: A-kâu-thiaⁿ was established. In 1909, the name changed to Akō Chō (阿緱廳); Pe̍h-ōe-jī: A-kâu-thiaⁿ. In 1920, the name was changed to Heitō City (屏東市); Pe̍h-ōe-jī: Pîn-tong-chhī and was under Takao Prefecture administration, which consisted of modern-day Pingtung County and Kaohsiung.

=== Republic of China ===
Following the handover of Taiwan from Japan to the Republic of China on 25 October 1945, the area of present-day Pingtung County was incorporated into Kaohsiung County on 25 December 1945. On 16 August 1950, Pingtung County was established after being separated from Kaohsiung County. On 1 December 1951, Pingtung City was downgraded from provincial city to county-administered city and made the county seat of Pingtung County.

Pingtung was the site of a 7.1 magnitude earthquake on 26 December 2006. In 2009, due to Typhoon Morakot, Pingtung received over 2,500 millimetres (98 in) of rainfall, breaking records for any place in Taiwan struck by a single typhoon.

== Geography ==
With a land area of over 2,775 km^{2} (1,071 sq mi), Pingtung is the fifth-largest county in Taiwan, and the second-largest of Southern Taiwan after Kaohsiung City. Geographically, it borders Kaohsiung City to the north, Taitung County to the east, the Taiwan Strait to the west and the Bashi Channel to the south. Islands administered by the county include Hsiao Liuchiu (Lamay Islet; 琉球嶼) and Qixingyan (Seven Star Reefs; 七星岩).

=== Climate ===
Located in the southernmost part of Taiwan, Pingtung County is known for one of the warmest climates within the country. It has a tropical monsoon climate bordering on a tropical wet and dry climate (Köppen climate classifications: Am bordering on Aw). The climate differs across the large county due to its varying geography.

Northern Pingtung, where Pingtung City is located, is characterized by high daytime temperatures year-round with average daytime highs of 30–40 °C (86–104 °F) from April to November, and 25–28 °C (77–82 °F) from December to March. The lowest nighttime temperatures are around 16 °C (61 °F), due to distance from the sea.

Central Pingtung, such as the coastal Fangliao Township, has a lower daytime temperatures and warmer nights due to the regulating effect of the ocean, which is especially noticeable during winter.

The mildest climate of Pingtung is at its southern tip, the Hengchun Peninsula, which is nearly surrounded by the Pacific Ocean. Daily highs reach 29–32 °C (84–90 °F) during summer and 23–26 °C (73–79 °F) during winter. Nighttime temperatures remain warm throughout the year with lows of around 25 °C (77 °F) during summer and 19 °C (66 °F) during the winter.

Climate data for Pingtung County (Hengchun Township)
Month	Jan	Feb	Mar	Apr	May	Jun	Jul	Aug	Sep	Oct	Nov	Dec	Year
Record high °C (°F)	32.2 (90.0)	32.4 (90.3)	34.2 (93.6)	35.8 (96.4)	37.1 (98.8)	36.4 (97.5)	35.6 (96.1)	35.3 (95.5)	36.0 (96.8)	34.1 (93.4)	33.8 (92.8)	32.5 (90.5)	37.1 (98.8)
Mean daily maximum °C (°F)	25.1 (77.2)	26.6 (79.9)	28.3 (82.9)	29.6 (85.3)	31.0 (87.8)	31.5 (88.7)	32.0 (89.6)	31.7 (89.1)	31.2 (88.2)	29.8 (85.6)	27.7 (81.9)	26.2 (79.2)	29.2 (84.6)
Daily mean °C (°F)	21.2 (70.2)	21.7 (71.1)	23.3 (73.9)	25.4 (77.7)	27.1 (80.8)	28.1 (82.6)	28.5 (83.3)	28.2 (82.8)	27.6 (81.7)	26.4 (79.5)	24.5 (76.1)	22.0 (71.6)	25.3 (77.6)
Mean daily minimum °C (°F)	18.3 (64.9)	19.0 (66.2)	20.3 (68.5)	22.5 (72.5)	24.2 (75.6)	25.5 (77.9)	25.7 (78.3)	25.4 (77.7)	24.9 (76.8)	24.0 (75.2)	22.2 (72.0)	19.6 (67.3)	22.6 (72.7)
Record low °C (°F)	8.4 (47.1)	9.8 (49.6)	10.4 (50.7)	14.7 (58.5)	17.1 (62.8)	18.6 (65.5)	19.4 (66.9)	19.5 (67.1)	18.7 (65.7)	16.0 (60.8)	12.7 (54.9)	9.5 (49.1)	8.4 (47.1)
Average rainfall mm (inches)	25.7 (1.01)	27.7 (1.09)	19.9 (0.78)	43.5 (1.71)	163.9 (6.45)	371.3 (14.62)	396.3 (15.60)	475.2 (18.71)	288.3 (11.35)	141.8 (5.58)	43.2 (1.70)	20.6 (0.81)	2,017.4 (79.43)
Average rainy days (≥ 0.1 mm)	8.0	6.8	4.8	6.3	11.1	16.9	16.4	18.9	15.9	10.8	7.1	6.1	129.1
Average relative humidity (%)	72.6	73.7	74.4	75.4	78.5	83.6	83.3	84.0	79.7	74.0	73.1	72.4	76.7
Mean monthly sunshine hours	168.0	165.1	199.7	192.6	193.9	183.6	221.0	195.5	177.2	198.1	177.7	161.4	2,233.8
Source: Central Weather Bureau (normals 1994–2013) (extremes 1897–present)

== Government ==
=== Administrative divisions ===
Pingtung County Administrative Divisions

Pingtung County is divided into 1 city, 3 urban townships, 21 rural townships, and 8 indigenous mountain townships. Pingtung County has the largest number of rural townships and mountain indigenous townships among the counties of Taiwan.

Type	Name	Chinese	Taiwanese	Hakka	Formosan
City	Pingtung City	屏東市	Pîn-tong	Phìn-tûng	
Urban townships	Chaozhou (Chaojhou)	潮州鎮	Tiô-chiu	Tshèu-chû	
Urban townships	Donggang	東港鎮	Tang-káng	Tûng-kóng	
Urban townships	Hengchun	恆春鎮	Hêng-chhun	Hèn-tshûn	
Rural townships	Changzhi (Changjhih)	長治鄉	Tióng-tī	Tshòng-tshṳ	
Rural townships	Checheng	車城鄉	Chhia-siâⁿ	Tshâ-sàng	
Rural townships	Fangliao	枋寮鄉	Pang-liâu	Piông-liàu	
Rural townships	Fangshan	枋山鄉	Pang-soaⁿ	Piông-sân	
Rural townships	Gaoshu	高樹鄉	Ko-chhiū	Kô-su	
Rural townships	Jiadong	佳冬鄉	Ka-tang	Kâ-tûng	
Rural townships	Jiuru	九如鄉	Kíu-jû	Kiú-yì	
Rural townships	Kanding	崁頂鄉	Khàm-téng	Kham-táng	
Rural townships	Ligang	里港鄉	Lí-káng	Lî-kóng	
Rural townships	Linbian	林邊鄉	Nâ-piⁿ	Lìm-piên	
Rural townships	Linluo	麟洛鄉	Lîn-lo̍k	Lìm-lo̍k	
Rural townships	Liuqiu (Liouciou)	琉球鄉	Liû-khiû	Liù-khiù	Lamay Island
Rural townships	Manzhou (Manjhou)	滿州鄉	Bóan-chiu	Mân-chû	Manutsuru^{Paiwan}
Rural townships	Nanzhou (Nanjhou)	南州鄉	Lâm-chiu	Nàm-chû	
Rural townships	Neipu	內埔鄉	Lāi-po͘	Lui-phû	
Rural townships	Wandan	萬丹鄉	Bān-tan	Van-tân	
Rural townships	Wanluan	萬巒鄉	Bān-loân	Van-lòng	
Rural townships	Xinpi	新埤鄉	Sin-pi	Sîn-phî	
Rural townships	Xinyuan (Sinyuan)	新園鄉	Sin-hn̂g	Sîn-yèn	
Rural townships	Yanpu	鹽埔鄉	Iâm-po͘	Yâm-phû	
Rural townships	Zhutian (Jhutian)	竹田鄉	Tek-chhân	Tsuk-thièn	
Mountain indigenous townships	Chunri (Chunrih)	春日鄉	Chhun-ji̍t	Tshûn-ngit	Kasugagu^{Paiwan}
Mountain indigenous townships	Laiyi	來義鄉	Lâi-gī	Lòi-ngi	Rai^{Paiwan}
Mountain indigenous townships	Majia	瑪家鄉	Má-ka	Mâ-kâ	Makazayazaya^{Paiwan}
Mountain indigenous townships	Mudan	牡丹鄉	Bó͘-tan	Méu-tân	Sinvaudjan^{Paiwan}
Mountain indigenous townships	Sandimen	三地門鄉	Soaⁿ-tē-mn̂g	Sâm-thi-mùn	Timur^{Paiwan}
Mountain indigenous townships	Shizi (Shihzih)	獅子鄉	Sai-chú	Sṳ̂-é	Sisigu^{Paiwan}
Mountain indigenous townships	Taiwu	泰武鄉	Thài-bú	Thai-vú	Klaljuc^{Paiwan}
Mountain indigenous townships	Wutai	霧臺鄉	Bū-tâi	Vu-thòi	Vedai^{Rukai}

Colors indicate the statutory language status of Hakka and Formosan languages in the respective subdivisions.

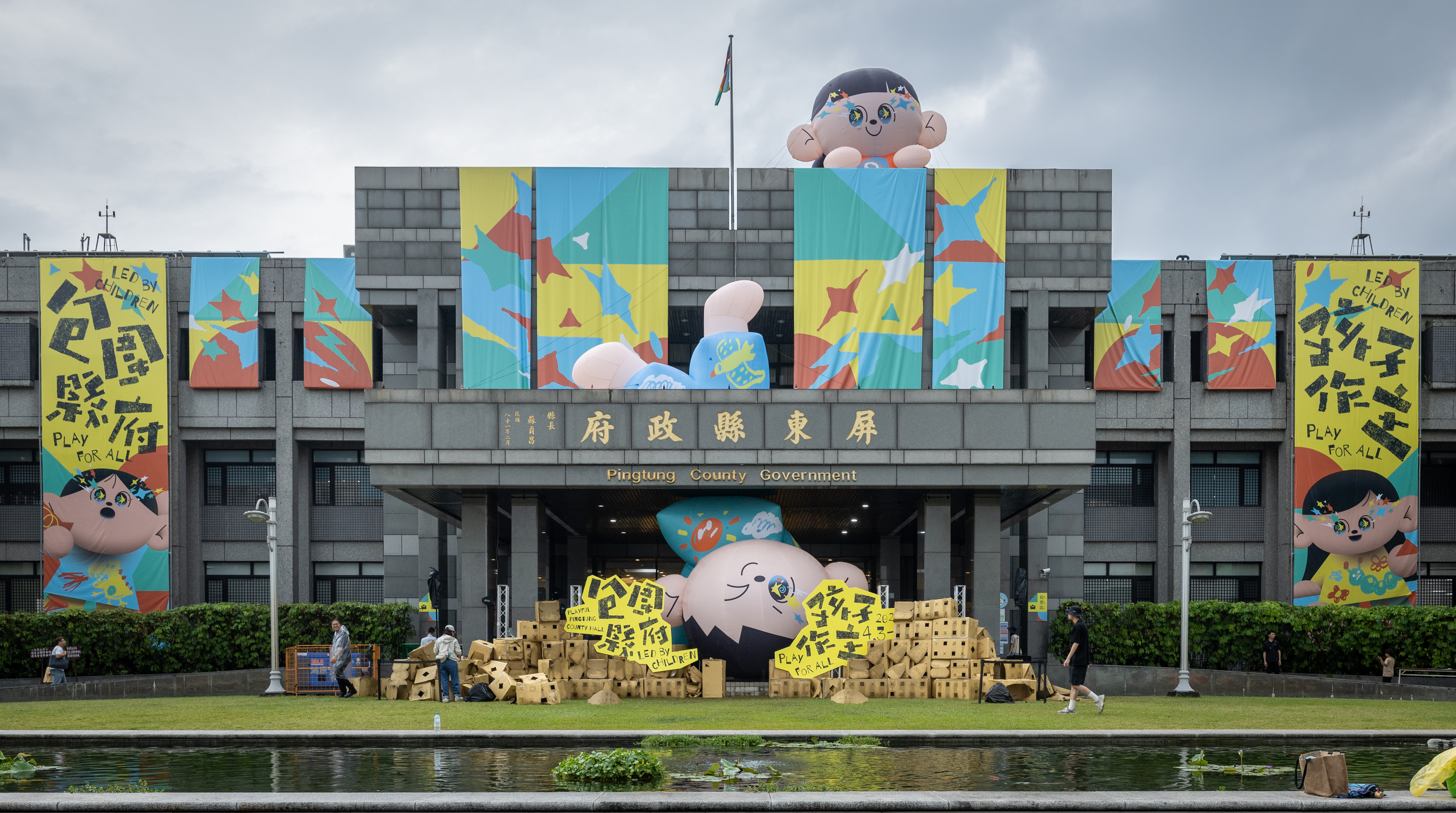
Pingtung County Government

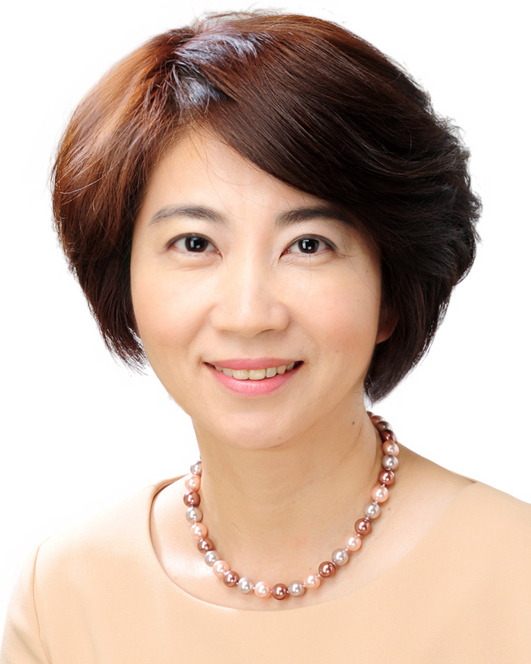
Chou Chun-mi, the incumbent magistrate of Pingtung County

=== Politics ===
Pingtung City is the county seat of Pingtung County which houses the Pingtung County Government and Pingtung County Council. The county head is Magistrate Pan Men-an of the Democratic Progressive Party. Pingtung County elected three Democratic Progressive Party legislators to the Legislative Yuan during the 2016 legislative election.

== Demographics ==
Historical population
Year	Pop.	±%
1950	465,956	—
1955	552,702	+18.6%
1960	645,400	+16.8%
1965	744,111	+15.3%
1970	828,761	+11.4%
1975	857,089	+3.4%
1980	888,270	+3.6%
1985	901,981	+1.5%
1990	893,282	−1.0%
1995	911,843	+2.1%
2000	907,590	−0.5%
2005	893,544	−1.5%
2010	873,509	−2.2%
2015	841,253	−3.7%
2016	835,792	−0.6%
2019	817,803	−2.2%
Source: 1. "屏東縣現住戶數、人口密度及性比例 (1950-1999)". 屏東縣統計提要（民國39年至88年） (Report). Vol. 中華民國39-88年(89.12). 屏東縣政府. December 2000. pp. 46–113 – via 政府統計資訊網 Government Statistics (National Central Library).; 2. "縣市人口按性別及五齡組(63)" (in Chinese (Taiwan)). Department of Household Registration,Ministry of the Interior (Taiwan).

Pingtung is home to the indigenous Rukai and Paiwan tribes, which makes up 7% of the population. As of January 2023, the total population of Pingtung County was 798,940. The county has been experiencing population decline for 15 consecutive years due to emigration to other cities.

View source data.

=== Religion ===
As of 2015, Pingtung County had 1,101 registered temples, the third highest amongst Taiwan's counties after Tainan and Kaohsiung. Donglong Temple and Checheng Fu'an Temple are some of the most prominent temples in the county. Indigenous tribes like Makatao people also have their own places of worship like Jiaruipu Temple.

== Economy ==
The agriculture and fishing industries dominate the county's economy. In recent years, the county has also promoted the tourism sector, which constituted 30% of Taiwan's tourism industry in 2015.

In February 2014, the county government announced a plan to develop an industrial center that consists of a service center, workshop, and performance venue. The aim is to promote the development of industries that leverage the unique cultural attributes of the Linali tribe. On 22 September 2015, the National Development Council revealed a three-year large-scale development plan to boost the economy of the county by transforming Dapeng Bay, Donggang Township, and Lamay Island into a fishery, recreational, and tourism hub.

== Education ==
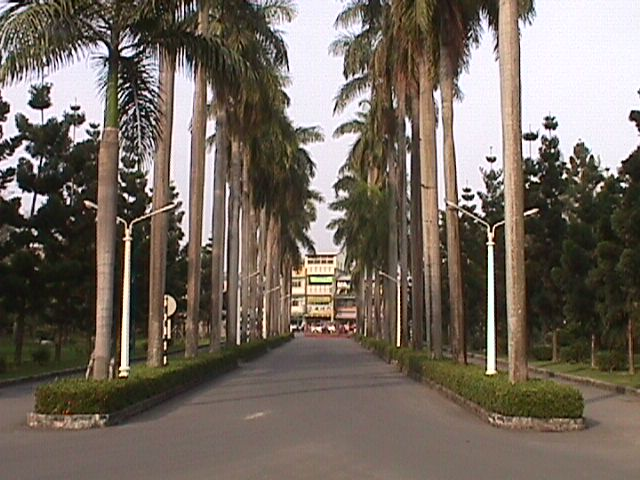
National Pingtung University

=== Universities and colleges ===
- Meiho University
- National Pingtung University (amalgamation of National Pingtung University of Education and National Pingtung Institute of Commerce)
- National Pingtung University of Science and Technology
- Tajen University
- National Dong Hwa University Graduate Institute of Marine Biology
- Tzu Hui Institute of Technology

=== High schools ===
- Pingtung Senior High School
- Pingtung Girl's Senior High School
- Da-Tong Senior High School
- Chao-Chou Senior High School

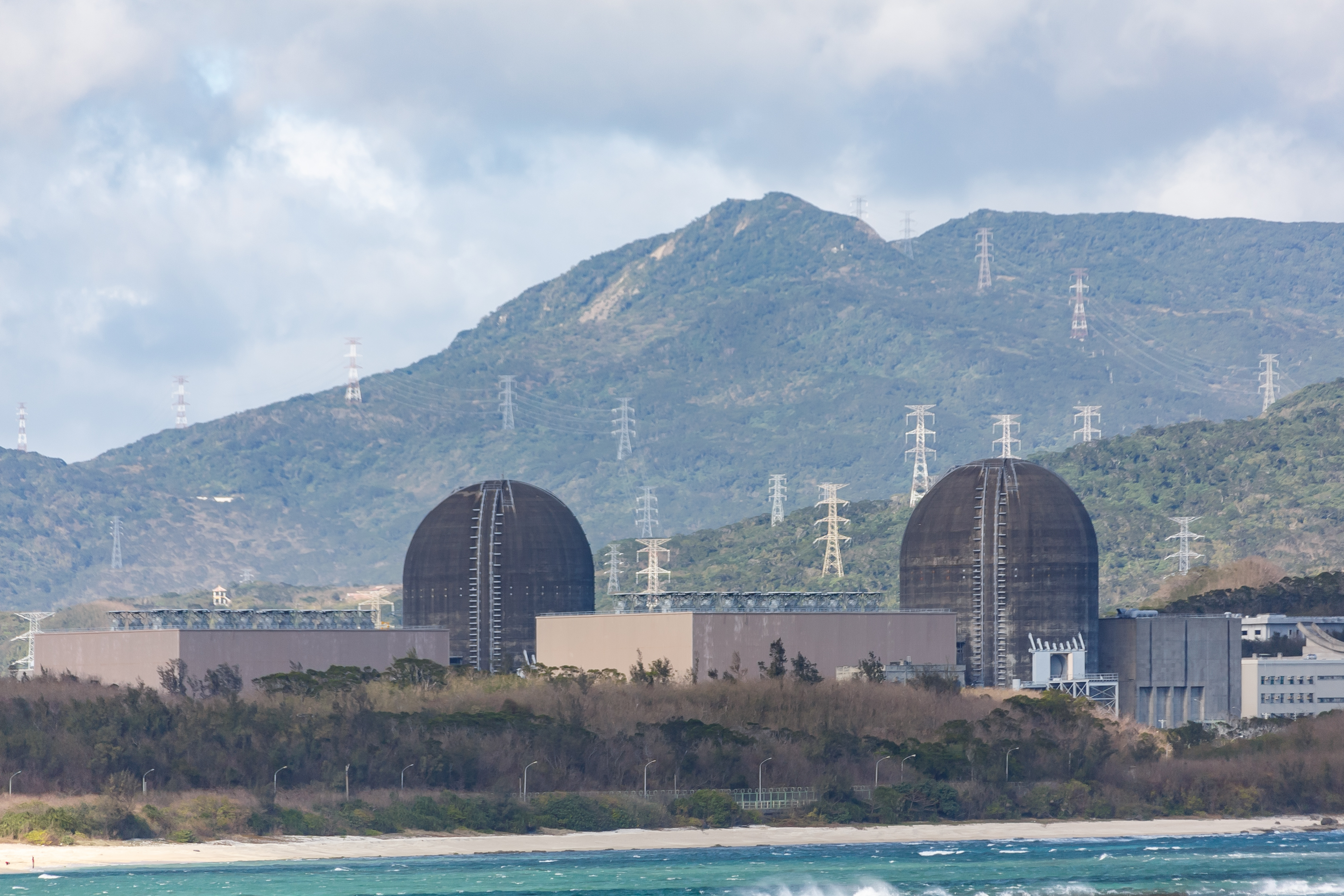
Maanshan Nuclear Power Plant

== Energy ==
Pingtung County houses Taiwan's third nuclear power plant, the Maanshan Nuclear Power Plant. The power plant is located in Hengchun Township. It is Taiwan's second-largest nuclear power plant in terms of its capacity at 2 × 890 MW.

== Transportation ==
=== Rail ===
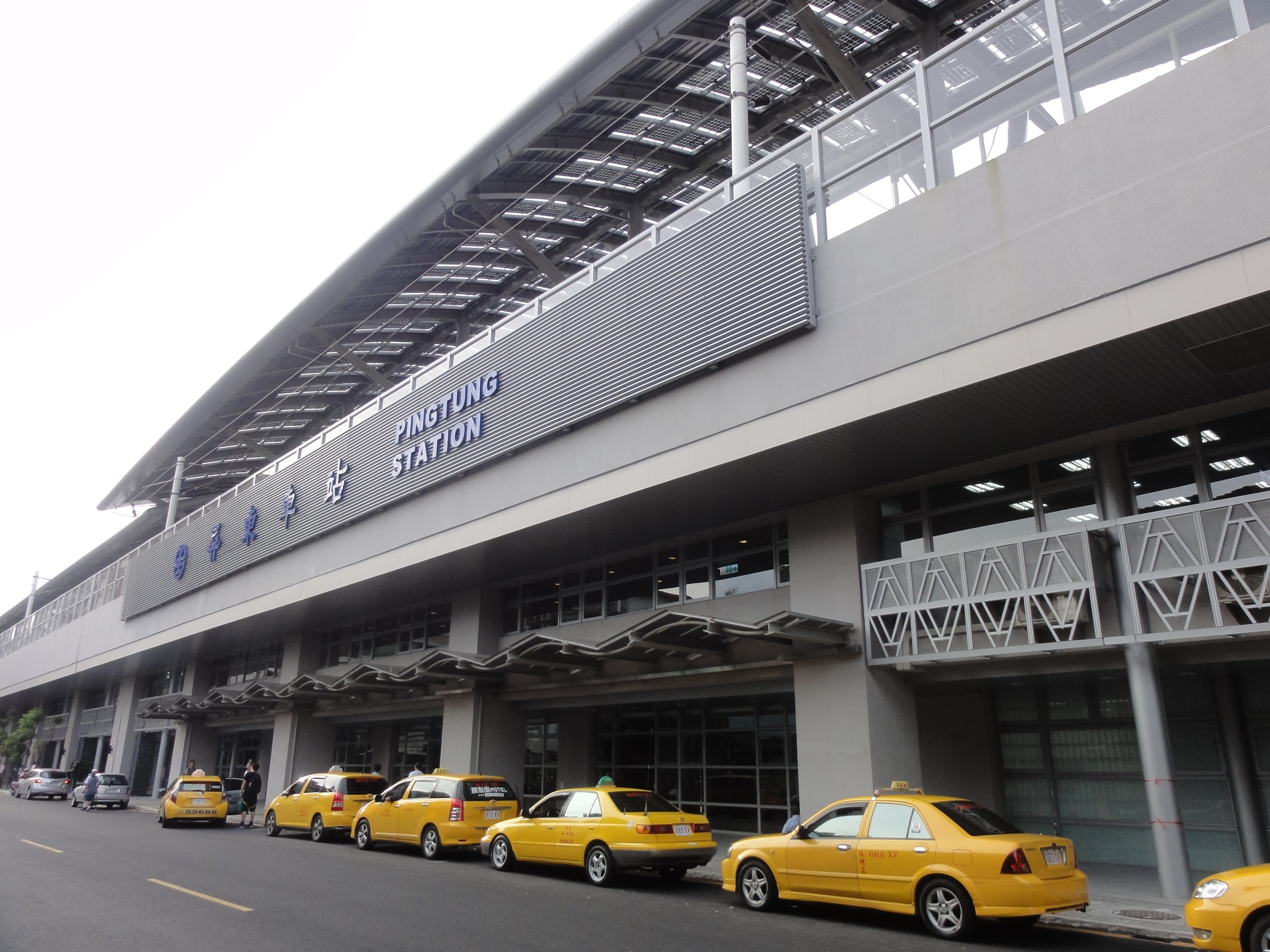
Pingtung Station

The Pingtung Line and South-Link Line of Taiwan Railway cross Pingtung County. These lines service Central Signal, Chaozhou, Donghai, Fangliao, Fangshan, Fangye Signal, Guilai, Jiadong, Jialu, Kanding, Linbian, Linluo, Liukuaicuo, Nanzhou, Neishi, Pingtung, Xishi, Zhen'an and Zhutian Station. The Pingtung Line links Pingtung County with Kaohsiung City, while the South-Link Line links Pingtung County with Taitung County.

=== Ferries ===
Ferry service operates between Donggang Township and Baisha Port and Dafu Port on the offshore Lamay Island.

== Tourist attractions ==
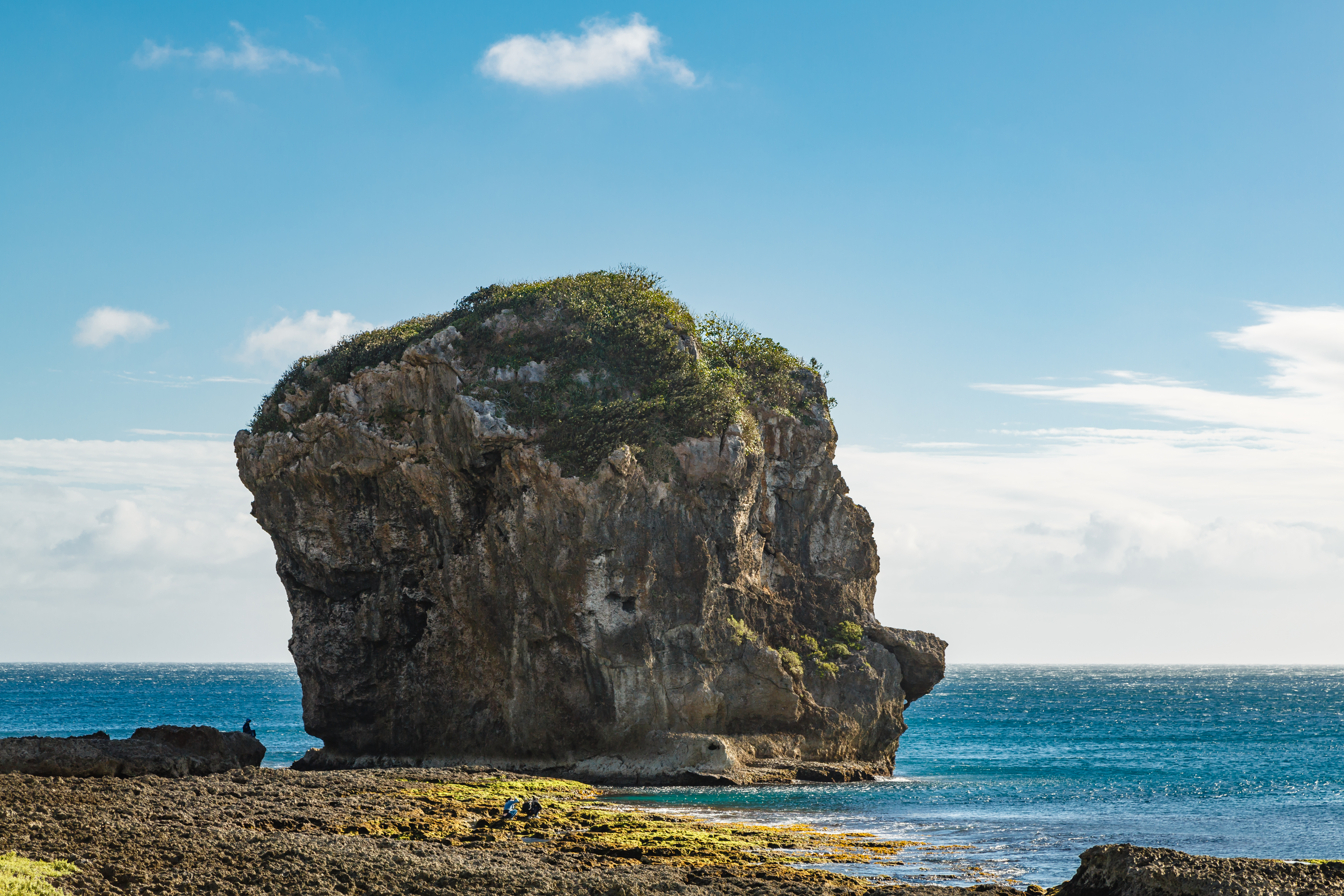
Kenting National Park

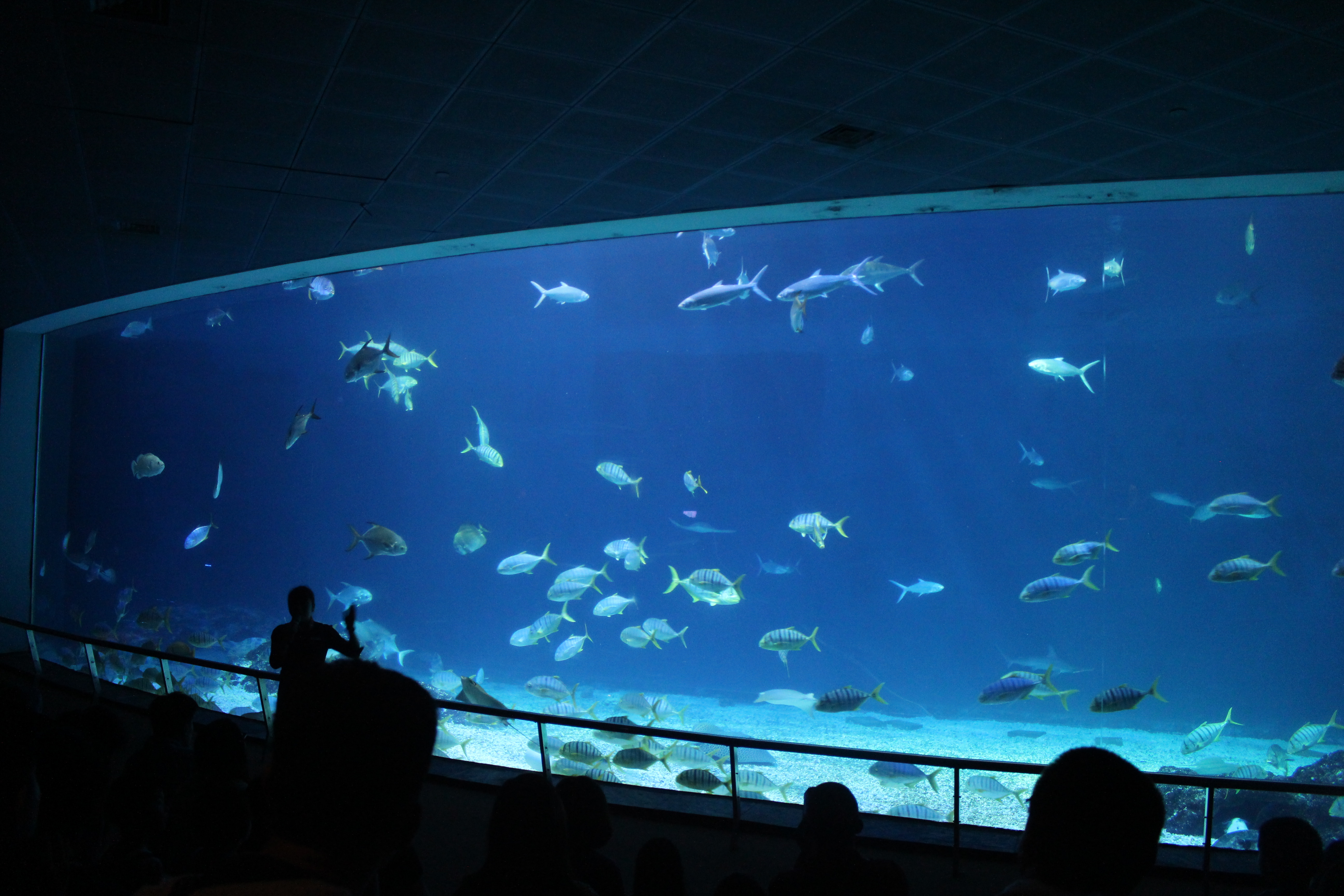
Aquarium at the Museum of Marine Biology

- Ahou City Gate
- Black Dwarf Cave
- Black Pearl – Top Quality Wax Apple
- Checheng Fuan Temple
- Chaolin Temple
- Danlin Suspension Bridge
- Donglong Temple
- Eluanbi Lighthouse
- Fangliao F3 Art Venue (Note: Located just a few minutes'walk from Fangliao train station, the art village stretches around 3,000 square meters which provides artists in residence plenty of room to work and live. Converted from old dormitories that once belonged to the Taiwan Railway Administration, the art village has been part of the Art Network of Railway Warehouses run by the Council for Cultural Affairs since 2002.)
- Fangshan Post Office
- Hengchun Chuhuo Natural Fire
- Indigenous Culture Hall
- Jialeshuei
- Jiaruipu Temple
- Jiuru Sanshan Guowang Temple
- Kaoping Iron Railway Bridge
- Kaoping Riverfront Park
- Kapok Trees
- Kenting National Park
- Kentington Resort
- Kuan Hai Shan Academy
- Landscape of Manjhou
- Linben Riverfront Park
- Linhousilin Forest Park
- Liudui Hakka Cultural Park
- Loacijia Slate Houses
- Longkeng Conservation Area
- Longluan Lake
- Longpan Park
- Mobitou
- Mudan Dam
- Museum of Traditional Theater
- National Museum of Marine Biology and Aquarium
- Old House of Siiao Family
- Penbay International Circuit
- Pingtung Art Museum
- Pingtung Hakka Cultural Museum
- Shuangliu Forest Recreation Area
- Sinpi Jian-gong Water Park
- South Bay
- Taipower Exhibit Center in Southern Taiwan
- Taiwan Indigenous Peoples Cultural Park
- Tongkang Mosque
- Wanchin Church
- Yang Family Ancestral Hall
- Zhong-Sheng-Gong Memorial

== See also ==
- List of county magistrates of Pingtung
- List of Taiwanese superlatives
