= Pingtung line =

Railway line in Taiwan

Pingtung Line

Overview
- Native name: 屏東線
- Status: In operation
- Owner: Taiwan Railway Corporation
- Termini: Kaohsiung; Fangliao
- Stations: 21

Service
- Type: Heavy rail
- Operator(s): Taiwan Railway Corporation
- Ridership: 5.2 million in the first half of 2019

History
- Opened: 15 December 1941

Technical
- Line length: 61.3 km (38.1 mi)
- Number of tracks: 2 (Kaohsiung to Chaozhou), 1 (Chaozhou to Fangliao)
- Track gauge: 3 ft 6 in (1,067 mm)
- Electrification: 25 kV/60 Hz catenary
- Operating speed: 150 km/h (93 mph)

The Pingtung Line (Chinese: 屏東線; pinyin: Píngdōng Xiàn; Pe̍h-ōe-jī: Pîn-tong Soàⁿ) is part of the West Coast line of Taiwan Railway.

It is 61.3 km (38.1 mi) long, of which 36.1 km (22.4 mi) is double track.

The section between Nanzhou and Linbian railway stations will be upgraded from a single-track railway to a double-track railway in December 2019 while the section between Chaozhou and Nanzhou, and the section between Linbian and Fangliao is expected to remain in single-track.

Taiwanese government stated in 2007 that it reserved the possibility to upgrade the entire section to dual-track railway when the number of travelers through Pingtung Line reaches a certain level

== History ==
The line was completed in 1941. The section between Kaohsiung and Pingtung was electrified on 10 July 1996. The section between Pingtung and Chaozhou was electrified on 23 August 2015, when the elevated tracks between the two stations opened.

=== Chaozhou–Fangliao upgrades ===
Immediately following the completion of the elevated tracks between Pingtung and Chaozhou, the TRA began planning for the electrification of the last section of the line between Chaozhou and Fangliao. The plan was approved by the Ministry of the Interior on 3 June 2013, and construction began on 16 November 2014.

Aside from electrifying the tracks, the following upgrades were carried out simultaneously:

- Extending and raising platforms at all stations to cater to low-floor trains
- Adding a second track between Nanzhou and Linbian
- Adding a second platform at Zhen'an and Jiadong

The infrastructure was completed in October 2019, and beginning on 8 November, test runs using electric trains were carried out on the line. The electrified tracks officially entered service on 23 December 2019.

== Stations ==
Name	Chinese	Taiwanese	Hakka	Transfers and notes	Location	
Kaohsiung	高雄	Ko-hiông	Kô-hiùng	→ West Coast line Kaohsiung	Sanmin	Kaohsiung
Minzu	民族	Bîn-cho̍k	Mìn-chhu̍k		Sanmin	Kaohsiung
Science and Technology Museum	科工館	Kho-kang-koán	Khô-kûng-kón	Science and Technology Museum	Sanmin	Kaohsiung
Zhengyi	正義	Chèng-gī	Chang-ngi		Sanmin	Kaohsiung
Fengshan	鳳山	Hōng-soaⁿ	Fung-sân	Fongshan	Fengshan	Kaohsiung
Houzhuang	後庄	Āu-chng	Heu-chông		Daliao	Kaohsiung
Jiuqutang	九曲堂	Kiú-khiok-tông	Kiú-khiuk-thòng		Dashu	Kaohsiung
Liukuaicuo	六塊厝	La̍k-tè-chhù	Liuk-khoài-chhṳ̀		Pingtung	Pingtung; County
Pingtung	屏東	Pîn-tong	Phìn-tûng		Pingtung	Pingtung; County
Guilai	歸來	Kui-lâi	Kûi-lòi		Pingtung	Pingtung; County
Linluo	麟洛	Lîn-lo̍k	Lìm-lo̍k		Linluo	Pingtung; County
Xishi	西勢	Sai-sì	Sî-sṳ		Zhutian	Pingtung; County
Zhutian	竹田	Tek-chhân	Chuk-thièn		Zhutian	Pingtung; County
Chaozhou	潮州	Tiô-chiu	Chheù-chû		Chaozhou	Pingtung; County
Kanding	崁頂	Khàm-téng	Kham-táng		Kanding	Pingtung; County
Nanzhou	南州	Lâm-chiu	Nàm-chû		Nanzhou	Pingtung; County
Zhen'an	鎮安	Tìn-an	Chṳ́n-ôn		Linbian	Pingtung; County
Linbian	林邊	Nâ-piⁿ	Lìm-piên		Linbian	Pingtung; County
Jiadong	佳冬	Ka-tang	Kâ-tûng		Jiadong	Pingtung; County
Donghai	東海	Tang-hái	Tûng-hói		Fangliao	Pingtung; County
Fangliao	枋寮	Pang-liâu	Piông-liàu	→ South-link line	Fangliao	Pingtung; County

== See also ==
- West Coast line (Taiwan)
