= Kanding Station =

Kanding Station may refer to two stations in Taiwan:

- Kanding railway station in Kanding, Pingtung
- Kanding light rail station in Tamsui, New Taipei
