= National Chao-Chou Senior High School =

Coordinates: 22.5495°N 120.5451°E

- 國立潮州高級中學
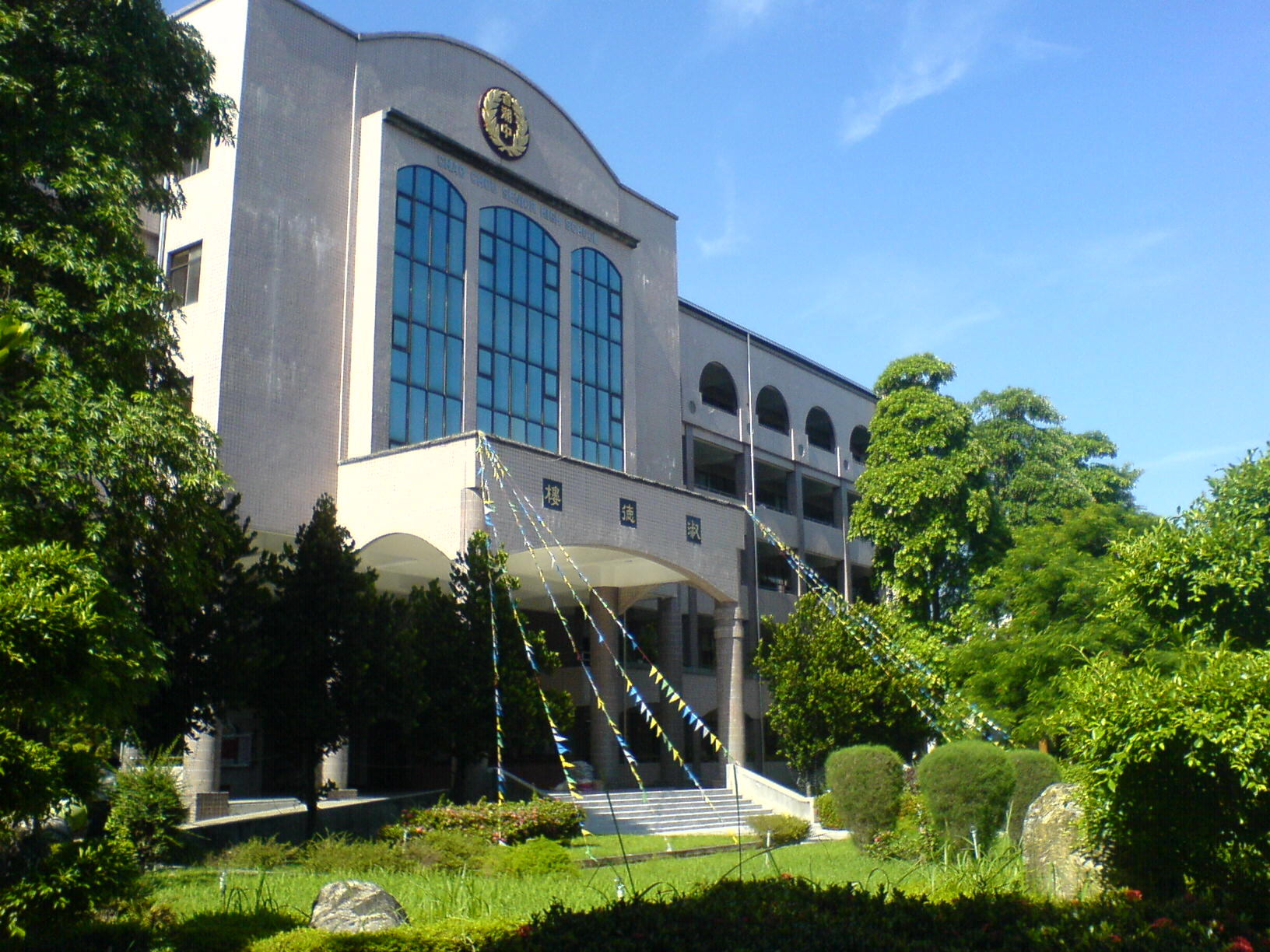
- No. 11 Zhongshan Road, Chaochou, Pingtung County, Taiwan

Information
- Type: National Senior High School
- Motto: 勤、僕、素、毅
- Established: 1942 (年，淑德女校)
- School district: Taiwan
- Principal: 陳建蒼; Chien-Tsang Chen
- Grades: 42 classes (39 regular classes, 3 gymnastics training classes)
- Enrollment: <1500
- Campus size: 5.85 hectares (14.5 acres)
- Website: www.ccsh.ptc.edu.tw

National Chao-Chou Senior High School (CCSH; Chinese: 國立潮州高級中學) is a national high school in Chaozhou Township, Pingtung County, Taiwan Province, Republic of China.

== Introduction History ==
This school was founded in March 1942, formerly known as Chaochou Shude Girls' School (潮州淑德女學校), and held the opening ceremony at 23, May, 1942. In 1944, the school was renamed as Chaochou Girls' Agriculture and Vocational School (潮州農業實踐女學校). At February 1946, the school name was changed to Chaochou Middle School of Kaohsiung County (高雄縣立潮州初級中學). In 1949, the school was called Taiwan Provincial Chaochou Middle/High School (台灣省立潮州中學), and added high school education. Since 1968, the department of junior high school was faded away year after year. In July 1970 was renamed as Taiwan Provincial Chaochou High School (台灣省立潮州高級中學). After the downsizing of the provincial government at 2000, the school was being named as National Chao Chou Senior High School (國立潮州高級中學).

== Former Principal ==
=== Before the Retrocession of Taiwan ===
Name	Tenure	Note
蝶野勇雄	1942.3-1943.4	First. Chaochou Shude Girls' School
筒井格孝	1943.5-1945.12	April, 1944 Chaochou Girls' Agriculture and Vocational School

=== After the Retrocession of Taiwan ===
Nate	Tenure	Note
曾武麟	1945.1-1946.5	February, 1942 Chaochou Middle School of Kaohsiung County
謝才郎	1946.5-1947.8	
柯潮州	1947.9-1950.7	January, 1949 Taiwan Provincial Chaochou Middle/High School
劉述先	1950.8-1952.7	School song
熊惠民	1952.8-1959.7	
徐天秩	1959.8-1962.7	
吳芝生	1962.8-1963.8	
童家駒	1963.8-1968.7	
梁惠浦	1968.7-1973.9	July, 1970 Taiwan Provincial Chaochou High School
張進謀	1973.9-1984.1	
溫興春	1984.2-1985.2	
周慶星	1985.2-1990.7	
陳日春	1990.8-1992.1	
陳永安	1992.2-1994.7	
廖明星	1994.8-2000.7	February 1, 2000 National Chao Chou Senior High School
李培安	2000.8-2007.7	
陳建蒼; Chien-Tsang Chen	2007.8-	Incumbent

== Facilities and campus ==
- 淑德樓
- Education, Science, Culture Center(教科文中心)
- 明德樓
- Academic Building(教學大樓)
- Home Economics Building(家政大樓)
- Physical Fitness Center(體適能中心)
- 中興堂
- 校史館
- Swimming Pool(游泳池)

== Notable alumni ==
- Julia Peng
- 陳綺萱Sophia (singer)

== Transportation ==
The school is accessible within walking distance from Chaozhou Station of Taiwan Railway.

== See also ==
- Education in Taiwan
