= Zhen'an station =

Zhen'an station may refer to:

- Zhen'an station (Foshan Metro), a metro station on Line 3 of the Foshan Metro in Foshan, Guangdong Province, China
- Zhen'an railway station in Linbian Township, Pingtung County, Taiwan
- Zhen'an railway station (Shaanxi) in Zhen'an County, Shangluo, Shaanxi Province, China
