= Nanzhou Station =

Nanzhou Station can refer to:

- Nanzhou railway station, a railway station in Pingtung, Taiwan
- Nanzhou station (Guangzhou Metro), a station on the Guangzhou and Guangfo Metro
