= Donggang line =

Defunct railway line in Pingtung County, Taiwan

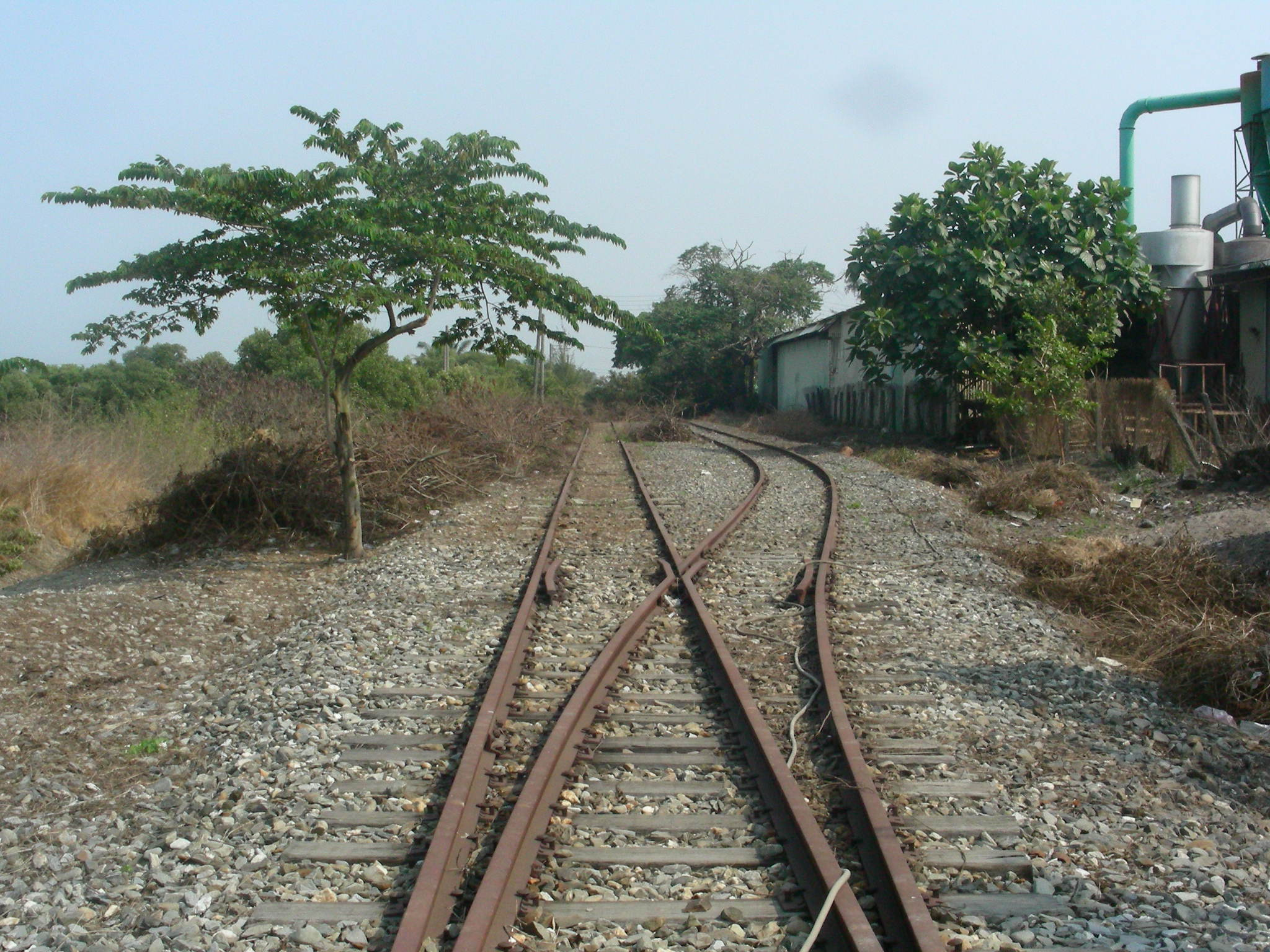
- A surviving headshunt on the Donggang Line

Overview
- Native name: 東港線
- Owner: Taiwan Railways Administration
- Termini: Zhen'an; Donggang
- Stations: 3

Service
- Type: Heavy rail
- Operator(s): Taiwan Railways Administration

History
- Opened: 19 July 1940
- Closed: July 2002

Technical
- Line length: 6.2 km (3.9 mi)
- Track gauge: 3 ft 6 in (1,067 mm)
- Electrification: None

The Donggang line (Chinese: 東港線; pinyin: Dōnggǎngxiàn) was a railway line of the Taiwan Railways Administration that ceased operations in July 2002. It was a branch line of the Pingtung line, diverging at Zhen'an Station to the coastal town of Donggang. The route ran parallel to the current-day Provincial Highway 17.

== History ==
During Japan's rule over Taiwan, the Pingtung line gradually extended from Pingtung City southward to Fangliao. Donggang residents petitioned to the government for the tracks to enter the town, and Donggang line entered service on 19 July 1940 as a branch line of the system. At the time of opening, the line had only two stations, Shebian (社邊, now Zhen'an) and Donggang; a third station named Dapeng was added on 1 December 1942. Aside from passenger services, the line also branched off into an air force complex located at the current Penbay International Circuit.

In 1983, the completion of the Shuangyuan Bridge across the Gaoping River made car travel to Kaohsiung much faster and caused a decline in ridership on the Donggang line. Afterwards, there were only ten round-trip services on the line, primarily served by a single DR2600 series car. Passenger services finally ceased on 1 March 1991. The line continued to carry military supplies into the air force base until July 2002.

=== Development plans ===
Former President Ma Ying-jeou once proposed that the Donggang line be reopened, but the plan was rejected by Donggang residents.

In 2016, the Ministry of Transportation and Communications again proposed to reopen the Donggang line as a light rail. Known as the "Donggang Tourism line" (東港觀光鐵道), the route mostly followed the old railway line, but terminated at Linbian instead of Zhen'an. However, Donggang residents also opposed this plan, and the route was deemed not economically viable.

A planned extension of the Kaohsiung MRT Red line will follow the route of the Donggang line between Donggang and Dapeng Bay.

== Stations ==
Name	Chinese	Taiwanese	Hakka	Transfers and notes	Location	
Zhen'an	鎮安			→ Pingtung line	Linbian	Pingtung County
Dapeng	大鵬				Donggang	Pingtung County
Donggang	東港				Donggang	Pingtung County
