= Yang Family Ancestral Hall =

Shrine in Jiadong, Pingtung County, Taiwan

- 楊氏宗祠
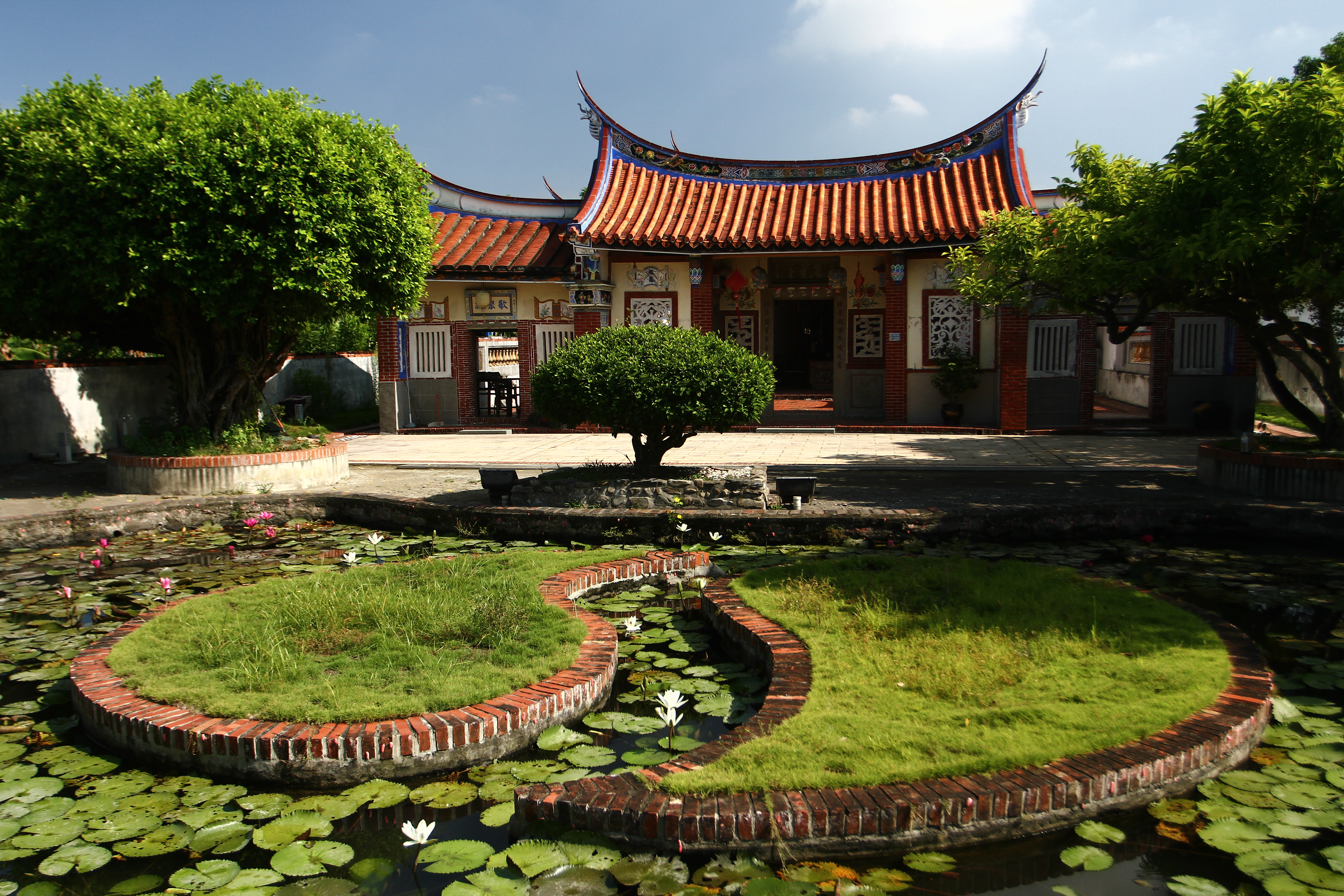
- Interactive map of the Yang Family Ancestral Hall area

General information
- Type: ancestral shrine
- Location: Jiadong, Pingtung County, Taiwan
- Coordinates: 22°25′9.3″N 120°32′50.5″E
- Completed: 1923

The Yang Family Ancestral Hall (traditional Chinese: 楊氏宗祠; simplified Chinese: 杨氏宗祠; pinyin: Yáng Shì Zōngcí) is an ancestral shrine in Jiadong Township, Pingtung County, Taiwan.

== History ==
The shrine was built in 1923 with funds collected by members of the Yang family living in Pingtung.

== Architecture ==
The building was constructed with traditional Hakka architecture style in quadrangle shape. It features a heart-shaped Tai chi pond located in front of the hall. The courtyard was built with red bricks. There are moon-shaped openings on the wall located on both sides of the courtyard. It is registered as the 3rd category historical site by the government.

== Transportation ==
The shrine is accessible within walking north of Jiadong Station of Taiwan Railway.

== See also ==
- Chinese ancestral veneration
- Chaolin Temple
- Donglong Temple
- Checheng Fuan Temple
- Three Mountains King Temple
- List of temples in Taiwan
- List of tourist attractions in Taiwan
