= Museum of Traditional Theater =

Museum in Chaozhou, Pingtung County, Taiwan

Taiwanese Opera and Puppet Museum in Pingtung
- 屏東戲曲故事館
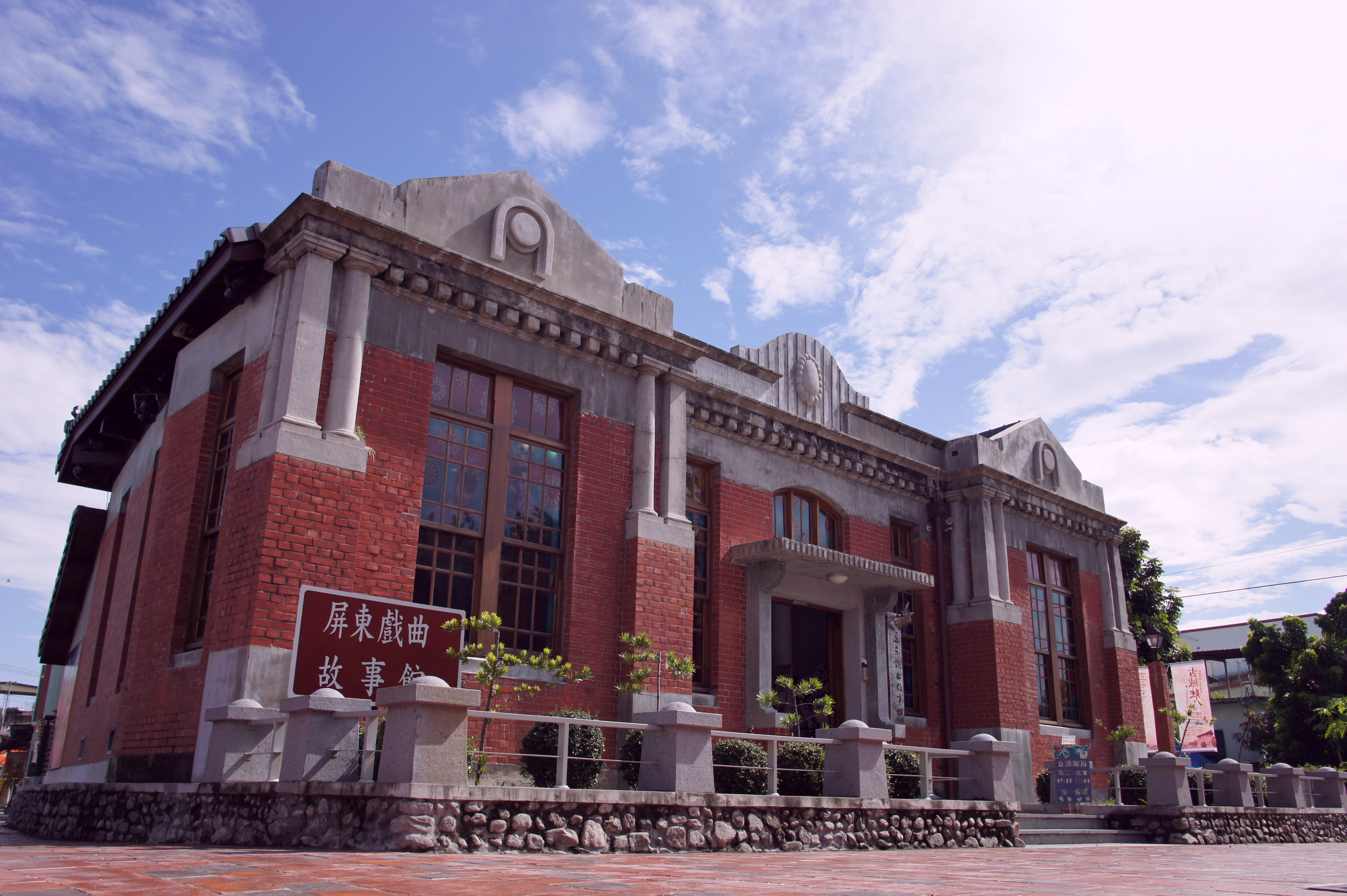
- Former name: Chaozhou Post Office
- Location: Chaozhou, Pingtung County, Taiwan
- Coordinates: 22°33′01.6″N 120°32′34.4″E
- Type: museum
- Public transit access: Chaozhou Station

The Museum of Traditional Theater, also known as the Taiwanese Opera and Puppet Museum in Pingtung (traditional Chinese: 屏東戲曲故事館; simplified Chinese: 屏东戏曲故事馆; pinyin: Píngdōng Xìqǔ Gùshìguǎn), is a museum in Chaozhou Township, Pingtung County, Taiwan.

== History ==
The museum building used to house the Chaozhou Town Hall during the Japanese rule of Taiwan. After the handover of Taiwan from Japan to the Republic of China in 1945, the building was used for telecommunication service purpose. Later on, the building housed a post office. In 2002, the Pingtung County Government renovated the building as a venue for the promotion of traditional arts.

== Transportation ==
The museum is accessible within walking distance east of Chaozhou Station of Taiwan Railway.

== See also ==
- List of museums in Taiwan
