= Xishi railway station =

Railway station in Zhutian, Pingtung, Taiwan

Xishi Station 西勢車站
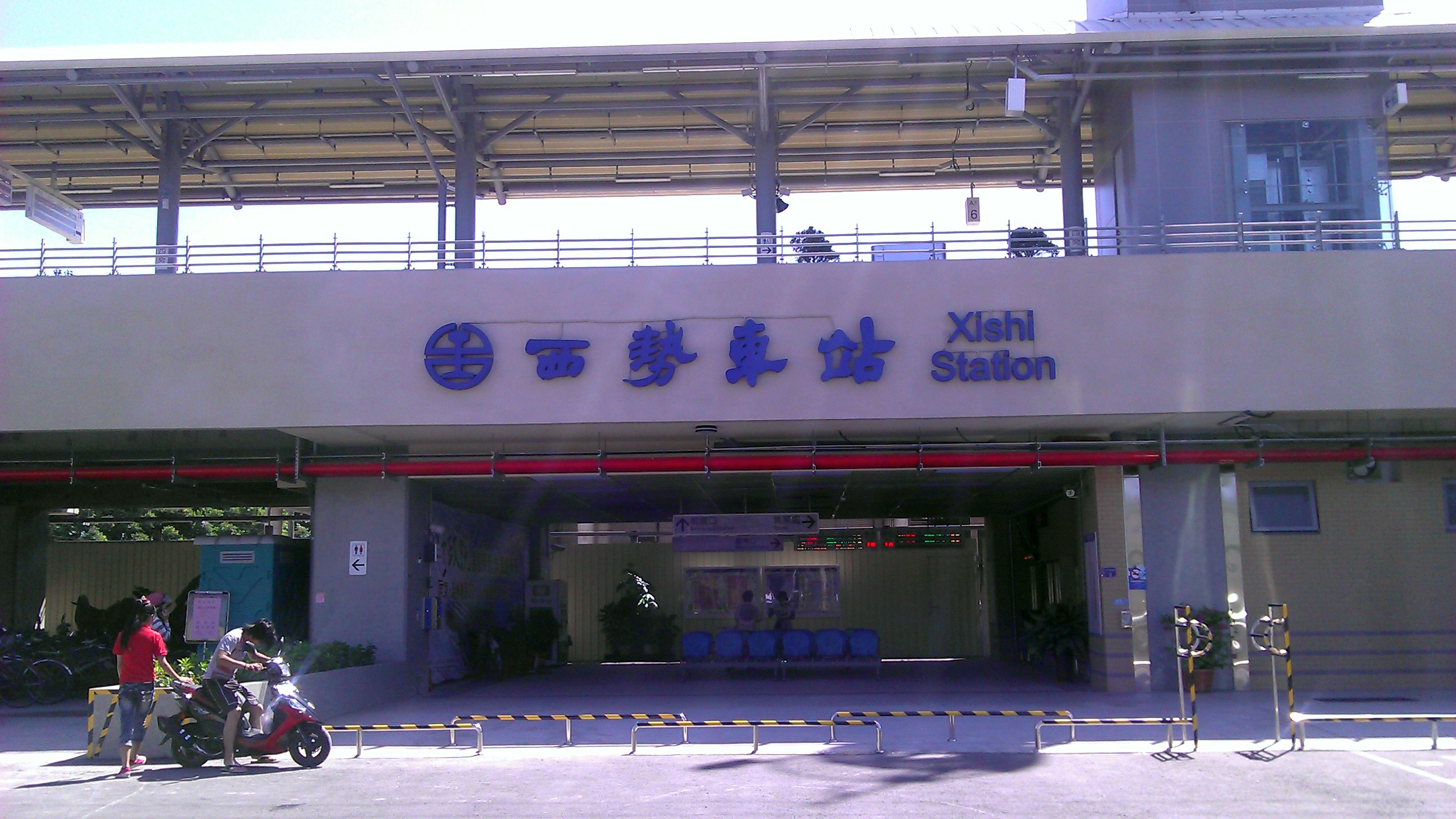
- Station entrance

Chinese name
- Traditional Chinese: 西勢車站
Transcriptions
Standard Mandarin
- Hanyu Pinyin: Xīshì Chēzhàn
- Bopomofo: ㄒㄧ ㄕˋ ㄔㄜ ㄓㄢˋ

General information
- Location: Zhutian, Pintung; Taiwan
- Coordinates: 22°36′58″N 120°31′36″E
- System: Taiwan Railway railway station
- Line: Pingtung line
- Distance: 28.3 km to Kaohsiung
- Platforms: 2 island platforms

Construction
- Structure type: Elevated

Other information
- Station code: 193

History
- Opened: 16 November 1919; 106 years ago

Passengers
- 2017: 166,911 per year
- Rank: 135

Services
Preceding station	Taiwan Railway	Following station
Linluo towards Kaohsiung	Western Trunk line (Pingtung)	Zhutian towards Fangliao
Location

Xishi railway station (Chinese: 西勢車站; pinyin: Xīshì Chēzhàn) is a railway station located in Zhutian Township, Pingtung County, Taiwan. It is located on the Pingtung line and is operated by Taiwan Railway.

== Around the station ==
- Pingtung Hakka Cultural Museum
