= Pingtung Hakka Cultural Museum =

Museum in Zhutian, Pingtung County, Taiwan

- 屏東縣客家文物館
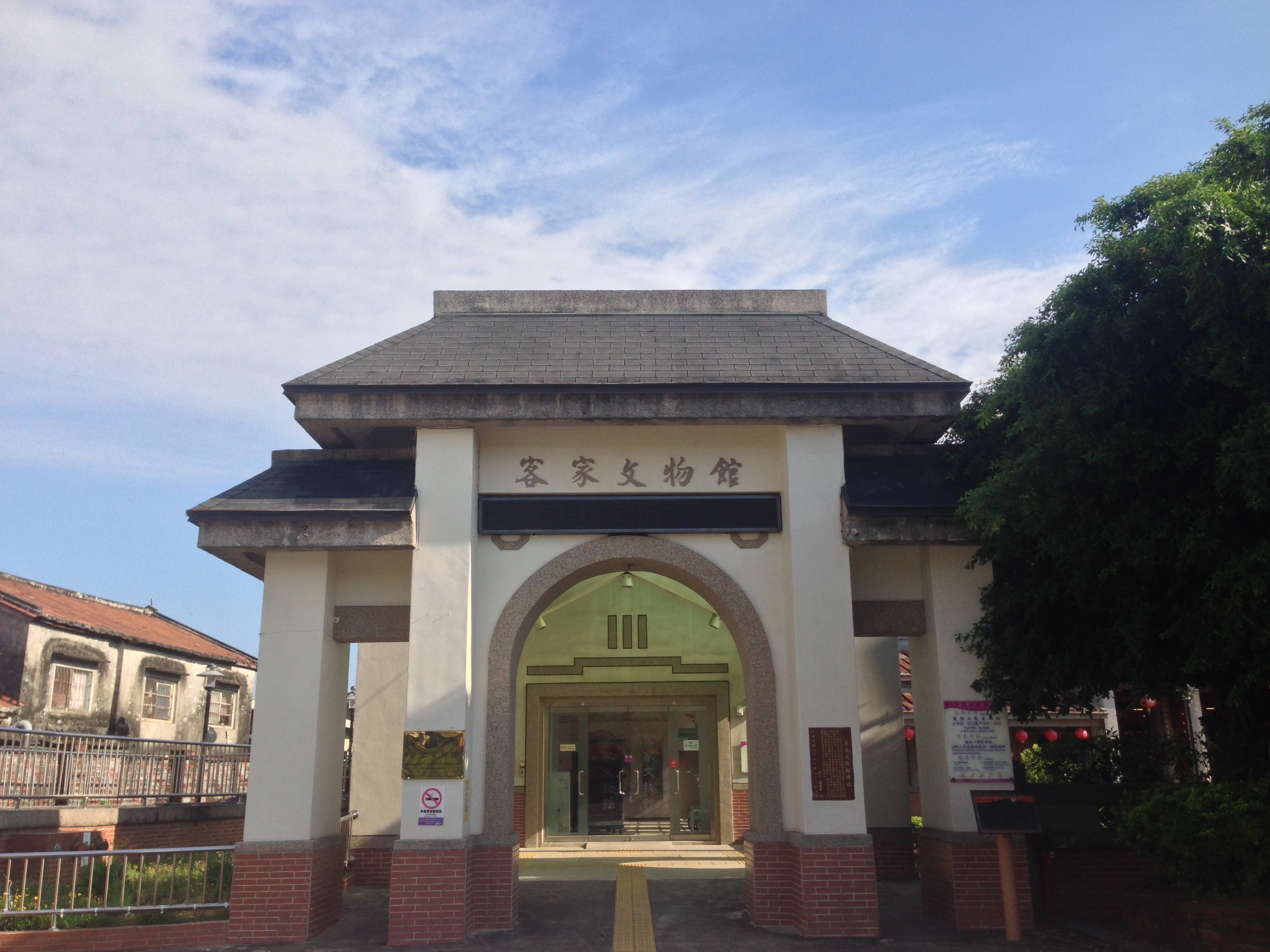
- Established: 2001
- Location: Zhutian, Pingtung County, Taiwan
- Coordinates: 22°37′5.8″N 120°31′23.5″E
- Type: museum
- Public transit access: Xishi Station

The Pingtung Hakka Cultural Museum (traditional Chinese: 屏東縣客家文物館; simplified Chinese: 屏东县客家文物馆; pinyin: Píngdōng Xiàn Kèjiā Wénwùguǎn) is a museum about Hakka people in Zhutian Township, Pingtung County, Taiwan.

== History ==
The museum was opened in 2001.

== Architecture ==
The museum building was built with Hakka architectural layout over two floors in a cage layout. The exhibition areas are divided into the Hakka cultivation, Hakka farm life, Hakka life, Hakka culture and heritage.

== Transportation ==
The museum is accessible within walking distance north west of Xishi Station of Taiwan Railway.

== See also ==
- List of museums in Taiwan
