= Chiou Lien-hui =

Taiwanese politician

- 邱連輝
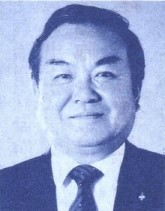

Member of the Legislative Yuan
- In office 1 February 1987 – 31 January 1996
- Constituency: Pingtung County

Magistrate of Pingtung County
- In office 20 December 1981 – 20 December 1985
- Preceded by: Ke Wen-fu
- Succeeded by: Shih Meng-hsiung

Member of the Taiwan Provincial Council
- In office 1973–1981

Member of the Pingtung County Council
- In office 1968–1971

Mayor of Linluo
- In office 1959–1965

Personal details
- Born: 15 October 1932 Chōkō, Heitō, Takao Prefecture, Taiwan, Empire of Japan (today Linluo, Pingtung County, Taiwan)
- Died: 13 September 2010 (aged 77)
- Party: Democratic Progressive Party
- Relations: Chiu Yi-ying

Chiou Lien-hui (Chinese: 邱連輝; pinyin: Qiū Liánhuī; 15 October 1932 – 13 September 2010) was a Taiwanese politician.

Chiou was first elected mayor of his native Linluo at age 27, and became the youngest mayor in Taiwan at the time. He served until 1965, and three years later was elected to the Pingtung County Council. As a member of the Taiwan Provincial Council from 1973 to 1981, Chiou was named the tangwai candidate for council speaker, but was defeated. He was once chastised by President Chiang Ching-kuo for discussing national affairs while in a provincial council meeting. In 1980, Chiou was the first tangwai candidate to be elected Pingtung County Magistrate. He stepped down in 1985 and served Pingtung County in the Legislative Yuan from 1987 to 1996.

Chiou died of stroke complications at the age of 77 on 13 September 2010. His funeral was held on 23 September.
