= Linhousilin Forest Park =

Park in Chaozhou, Pingtung County, Taiwan

- 林後四林平地森林園區
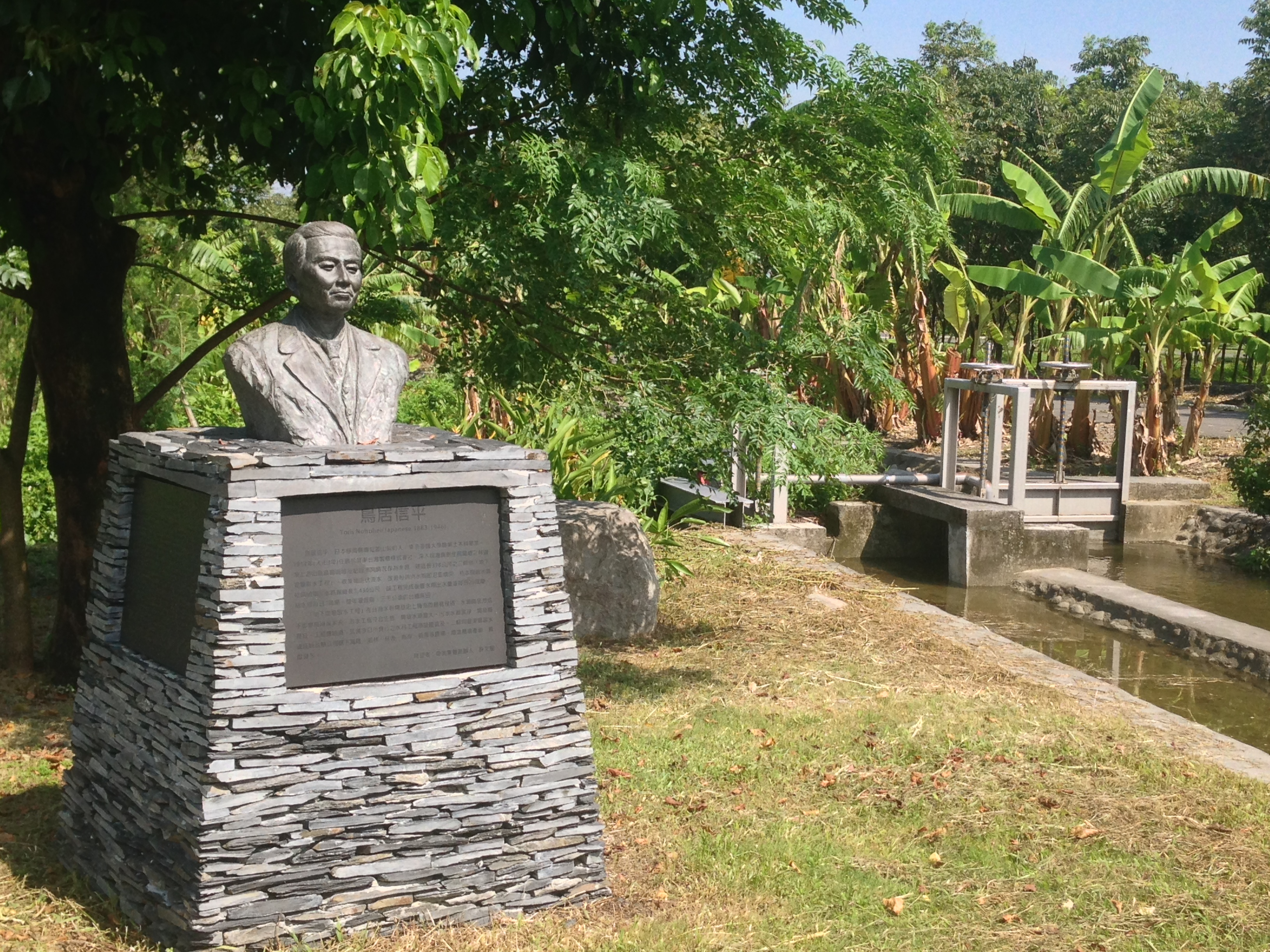
- Interactive map of Linhousilin Forest Park
- Type: forest park
- Location: Chaozhou, Pingtung County, Taiwan
- Coordinates: 22°32′19.3″N 120°35′25.4″E
- Area: 1,005 hectares (2,480 acres)
- Opening: 14 June 2014

The Linhousilin Forest Park (traditional Chinese: 林後四林平地森林園區; simplified Chinese: 林后四林平地森林园区; pinyin: Línhòusìlín Píngdì Sēnlín Yuánqū) is a park in Chaozhou Township, Pingtung County, Taiwan.

== History ==
The establishment plan of the park started by the i-Taiwan 12 Projects launched by the government in 2009. The park was inaugurated on 14 June 2014 with the first stage of the park covers an area of 85 hectares.

== Geology ==
The park was created as a lowland forest reserve. It spans over a total area of 1,005 hectares.

== Architecture ==
The park features modern art exhibitions.

== Controversy ==
Despite the fact that Taiwan operates an effective national rabies vaccination and certification program for pet dogs Linhousilin Forest Park along with other areas managed by the Forestry Bureau previously prohibited families from bringing pet dogs into the park, even if vaccinated and carrying the correct collar tag, threatening park visitors with a fine of up to NT$300,000 (approx US$10,000).

The policy was repealed in spring 2021, and dogs wearing the current year's anti-rabies vaccine tag may enter the park.

== See also ==
- List of parks in Taiwan
