= Bada Forest Paradise =

Theme park in Chaozhou, Pingtung County, Taiwan

Bada Forest Paradise 8大森林魔法樂園
- Interactive map of Bada Forest Paradise; 8大森林魔法樂園
- Location: Chaozhou, Pingtung County, Taiwan
- Coordinates: 22°32′53.6″N 120°33′27.0″E
- Status: Operating
- Theme: forestry

The Bada Forest Paradise (traditional Chinese: 8大森林魔法樂園; simplified Chinese: 8大森林魔法乐园; pinyin: 8 Dà Sēnlín Mófǎ Lèyuán) is a theme park in Chaozhou Township, Pingtung County, Taiwan.

== Attractions ==
The theme park consists of various exhibitions on plantation as well as many amusement rides.

== Transportation ==
The theme park is accessible by walking about 2.5km (1.6mi) east of the Chaozhou Station of Taiwan Railway.

== See also ==
- List of tourist attractions in Taiwan
