= Linluo railway station =

Railway station in Linluo, Pingtung County, Taiwan

Linluo Station 麟洛車站
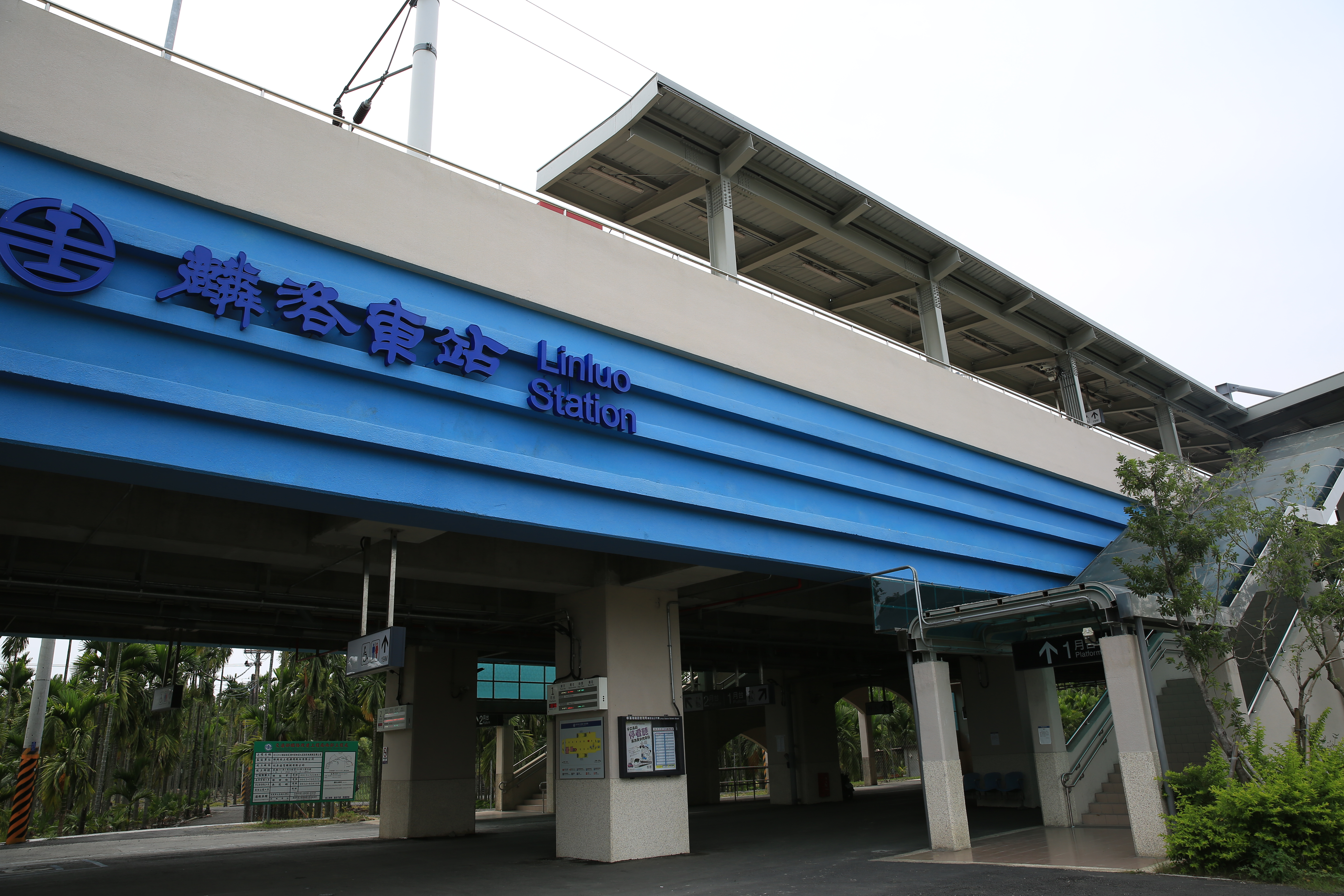

Chinese name
- Traditional Chinese: 麟洛車站
Transcriptions
Standard Mandarin
- Hanyu Pinyin: Línluò Chēzhàn
- Bopomofo: ㄌㄧㄣˊ ㄌㄨㄛˋ ㄔㄜ ㄓㄢˋ

General information
- Location: Linluo, Pintung; Taiwan
- Coordinates: 22°38′05.9″N 120°30′50.9″E
- System: Taiwan Railway railway station
- Line: Pingtung line
- Distance: 25.9 km to Kaohsiung
- Platforms: 2 side platforms

Construction
- Structure type: Elevated

Other information
- Station code: 192

History
- Opened: 1 July 1941; 85 years ago

Passengers
- 2017: 38,786 per year
- Rank: 179

Services
Preceding station	Taiwan Railway	Following station
Guilai towards Kaohsiung	Western Trunk line (Pingtung)	Xishi towards Fangliao
Location

Linluo railway station (Chinese: 麟洛車站; pinyin: Línluò Chēzhàn) is a railway station located in Linluo Township, Pingtung County, Taiwan. It is located on the Pingtung line and is operated by Taiwan Railway. It is two kilometers away from Linluo and is near Provincial Highway 1.

The station has two side platforms. In line with the Kaohsiung Chaozhou Railway MRT project, this station was converted into an elevated station on June 25, 2013.

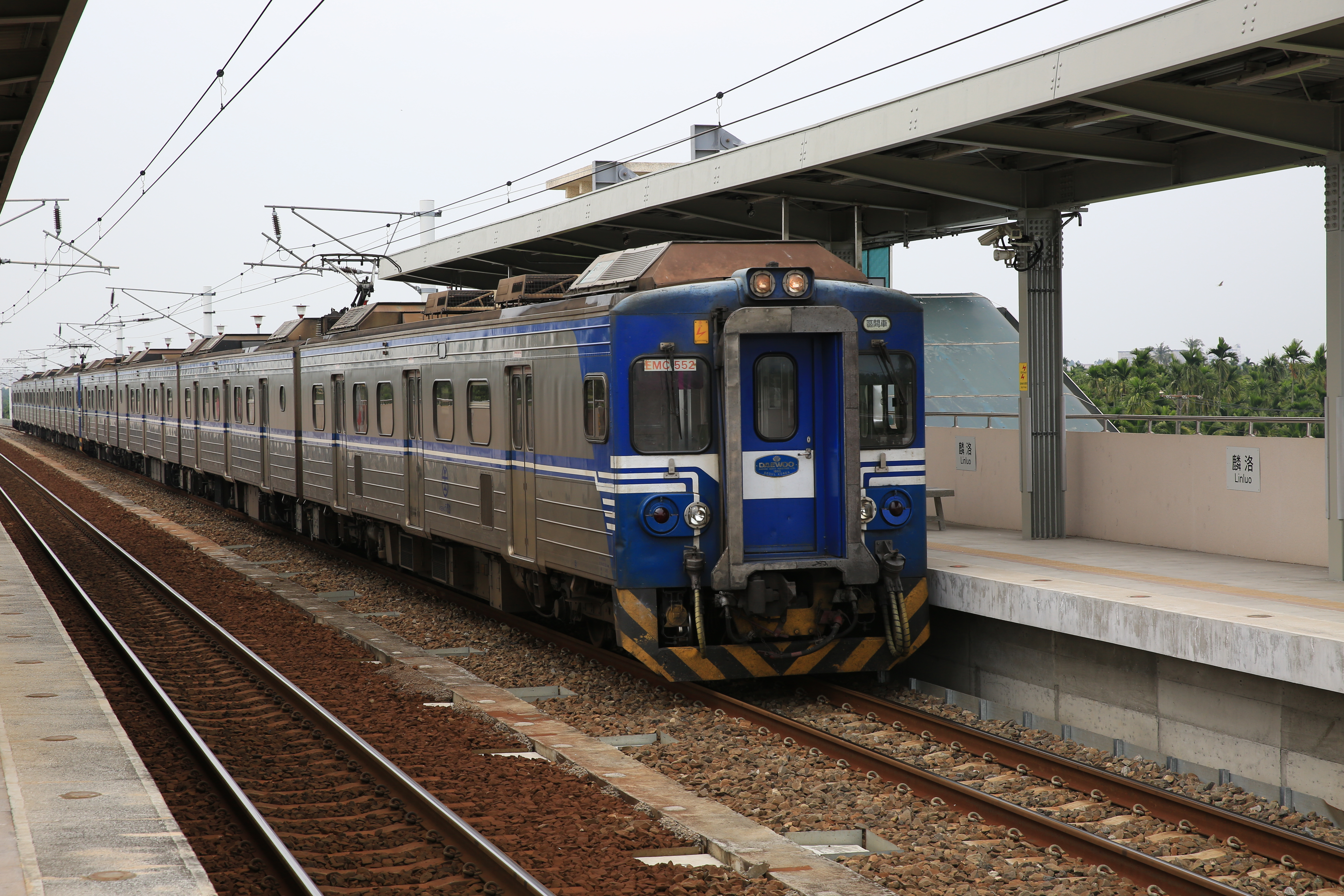
Train at the station

== History ==
- July 1, 1941: The Ailaoxi Signal station was established to manage the Shicha Branch line.
- 1949: Ailiaoxi station was changed into a passenger and freight operating station to handle general passenger and freight transport.
- May 1, 1951: Because the station is located in Linluo Township, Pingtung County, it was renamed to its current name.
- April 1968: The ballast branch line was removed.
- August 1, 1982: Freight operations ceased.
- March 1, 1986: Downgraded from a third-class station to a Class A simple station and designated to be managed by Pingtung station.
- March 1, 1989: Downgraded from a Type A simple station to a call station.
- June 25, 2013: Converted to an elevated station.
- August 23, 2015: The elevated double-track electrification line opened to traffic.
- October 15, 2015: Multi-card card swipe machine launched.

== Usage ==
-2000年
Year	Annual				Daily	
Year	Get on the bus	Get off the bus	Both on and off the bus	Source	Get on the bus	Get off the bus
1975	79,836	49,808	129,644		219	355
1976	81,316	47,309	128,625		222	351
1977	71,114	45,140	116,254		195	319
1978	無資料					
1979	無資料					
1980	80,118	79,129	159,247		219	435
1981	78,256	70,424	148,680		214	407
1982	62,246	58,529	120,775		171	331
1983	31,040	49,714	80,754		85	221
1984	23,757	40,905	64,662		65	177
1985	28,691	48,340	77,031		79	211
1986	22,129	38,386	60,515		61	166
1987	18,965	34,298	53,263		52	146
1988	14,884	29,286	44,170		41	121
1989	9,661	22,804	32,465		26	89
1990	10,607	22,581	33,188		29	91
1991	11,757	21,859	33,616		32	92
1992	12,506	20,480	32,986		34	90
1993	12,062	19,230	31,292		33	86
1994	12,549	21,635	34,184		34	94
1995	9,062	16,309	25,371		25	70
1996	11,462	18,111	29,573		31	81
1997	12,303	20,176	32,479		34	89
1998	9,103	16,915	26,018		25	71
1999	6,396	15,452	21,848		18	60
2000	2,289	14,519	16,808		6	46

2001年-
Year	Annual				Daily	
Year	Get on the bus	Get off the bus	Both on and off the bus	Source	Get on the bus	Get off the bus
2001	7,422	15,323	22,745		20	62
2002	9,303	16,082	25,385		25	70
2003	8,811	11,970	20,781		24	57
2004	8,073	10,605	18,678		22	51
2005	8,178	10,850	19,028		22	52
2006	8,452	10,282	18,734		23	51
2007	8,503	10,185	18,688		23	51
2008	10,633	12,672	23,305		29	64
2009	10,576	12,669	23,245		29	64
2010	11,407	13,608	25,015		31	69
2011	11,564	13,972	25,536		32	70
2012	11,131	13,617	24,748		30	68
2013	11,459	14,695	26,154		31	72
2014	11,645	15,169	26,814		32	73
2015	14,852	18,936	33,788		41	93
2016	29,695	34,297	63,992		81	175
2017	38,786	42,649	81,435		106	223
2018	45,339	50,090	95,429		124	261
2019	57,916	63,675	121,591		159	333
2020	49,664	53,797	103,461		136	283
2021	42,218	47,028	89,246		116	245
2022	45,496	50,031	95,527		125	261
2023						
