= Jiadong railway station =

Railway station located in Pingtung, Taiwan

Jiadong Station 佳冬車站
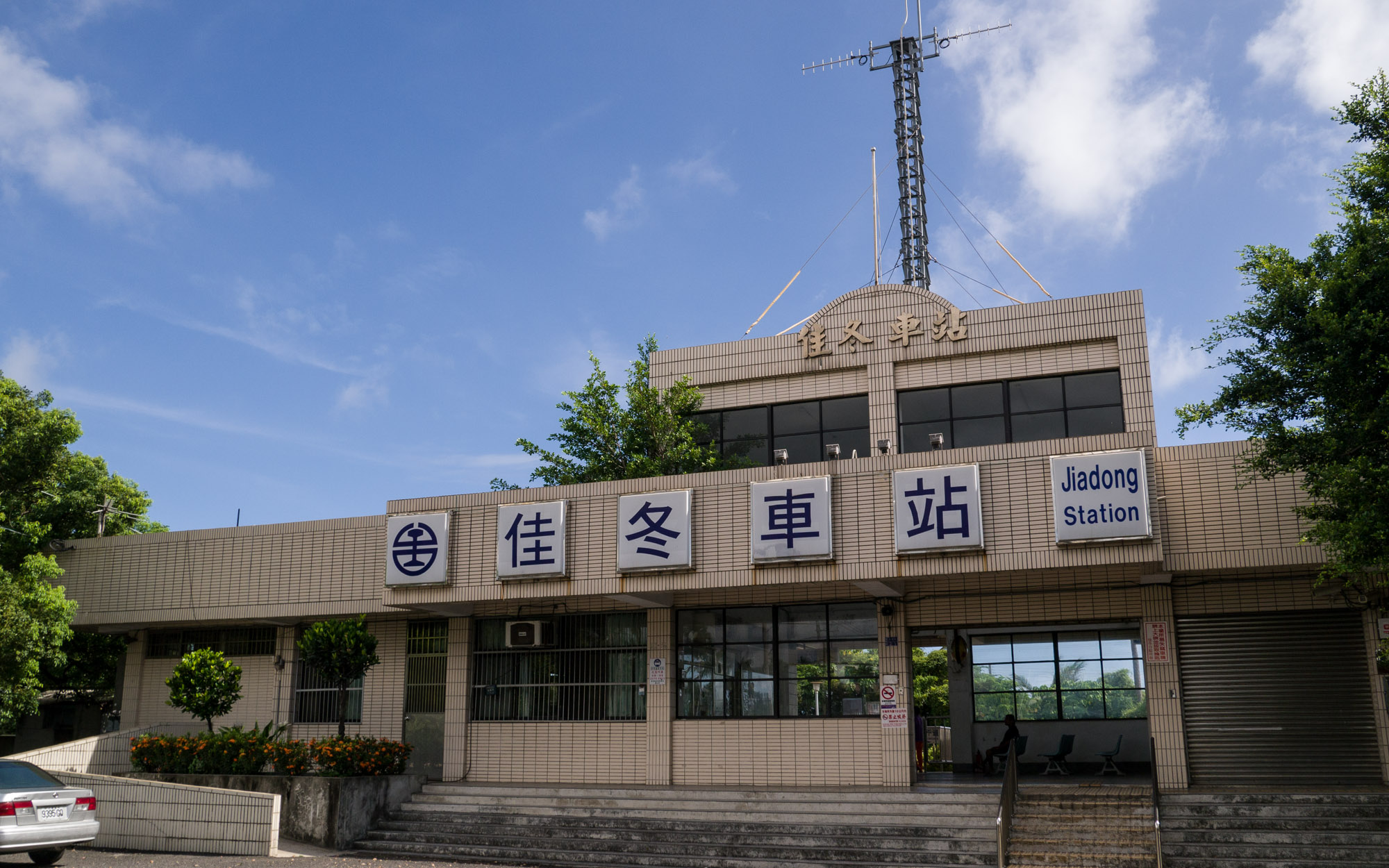

Chinese name
- Traditional Chinese: 佳冬車站
Transcriptions
Standard Mandarin
- Hanyu Pinyin: Jiādōng Chēzhàn
- Bopomofo: ㄐㄧㄚ ㄉㄨㄥ ㄔㄜ ㄓㄢˋ

General information
- Location: Jiadong, Pingtung; Taiwan
- Coordinates: 22°34′50.7″N 120°32′52.0″E
- System: Taiwan Railway railway station
- Line: Pingtung line
- Distance: 54.1 km to Kaohsiung
- Platforms: 1 island platform

Construction
- Structure type: At-grade

Other information
- Station code: 200

History
- Opened: 1 July 1940

Passengers
- 2017: 40,629 per year
- Rank: 181

Services
| Preceding station | Taiwan Railway | Following station |
|---|---|---|
| Linbian towards Kaohsiung | Western Trunk line (Pingtung) | Donghai towards Fangliao |
Location

Jiadong railway station (Chinese: 佳冬車站; pinyin: Jiādōng Chēzhàn) is a railway station located in Jiadong Township, Pingtung County, Taiwan. It is located on the Pingtung line and is operated by Taiwan Railway.

== Around the station ==
- Yang Family Ancestral Hall
