= Old House of Siiao Family =

Former residence in Jiadong, Pingtung County, Taiwan

- 蕭家祖屋
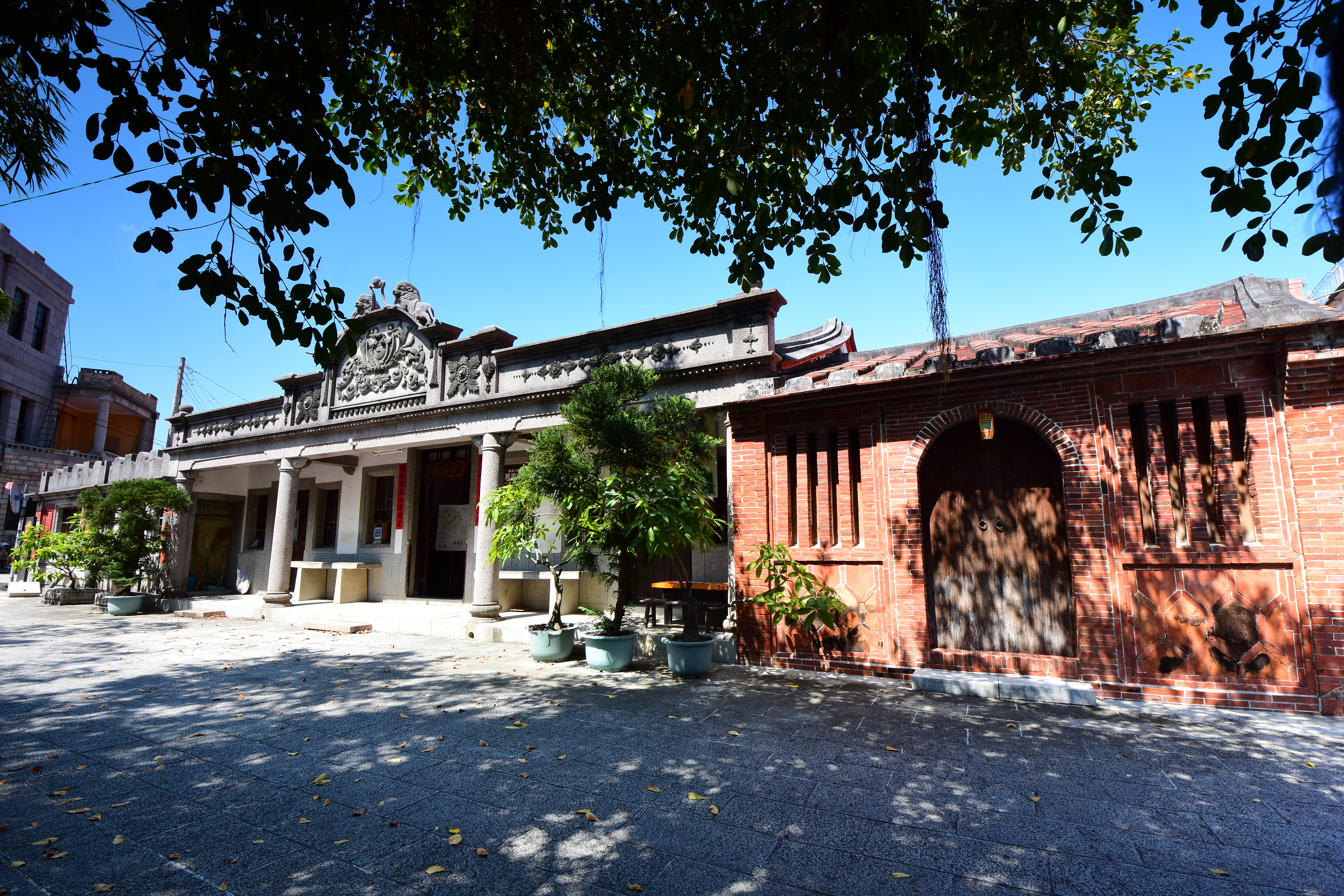
- Interactive map of the Old House of Siiao Family area

General information
- Type: former residence
- Location: Jiadong, Pingtung County, Taiwan
- Coordinates: 22°25′5″N 120°33′1.7″E
- Construction started: 1860
- Completed: 1880

Technical details
- Floor area: 4,000 m^{2}

The Old House of Siiao Family (traditional Chinese: 蕭家祖屋; simplified Chinese: 萧家祖屋; pinyin: Xiāo Jiāzǔwū) is a former residence in Jiadong Township, Pingtung County, Taiwan.

== History ==
The Siiao family came to Taiwan from Guangdong and worked as businessmen. They then decided to construct a house for their residential place. The construction of the house began in 1860 and completed in 1880. After the handover of Taiwan to Japan from Qing Dynasty in 1895, there was local conflict between the locals and Japanese government which stirred up some shooting. Some of the bullet holes remains are still visible on the room walls. The house was then later registered as Class 3 historical site.

== Architecture ==
The house was constructed with two courtyards and five blocks with Hakka architecture style. The five blocks are the entrance hall, ancestor's memorial tablets room and Gods of heaven and ground shrine room and dwelling places. It has a total floor area of 4,000 m^{2} and consists of more than 50 rooms.

== See also ==
- List of tourist attractions in Taiwan
