= Chaozhou, Pingtung =

Urban township in Pingtung County, Taiwan

Coordinates: 22°33′N 120°32′E

Chaozhou Township 潮州鎮 Chōshū, Chaojhou, Chaochow, Chaochou
- Urban township
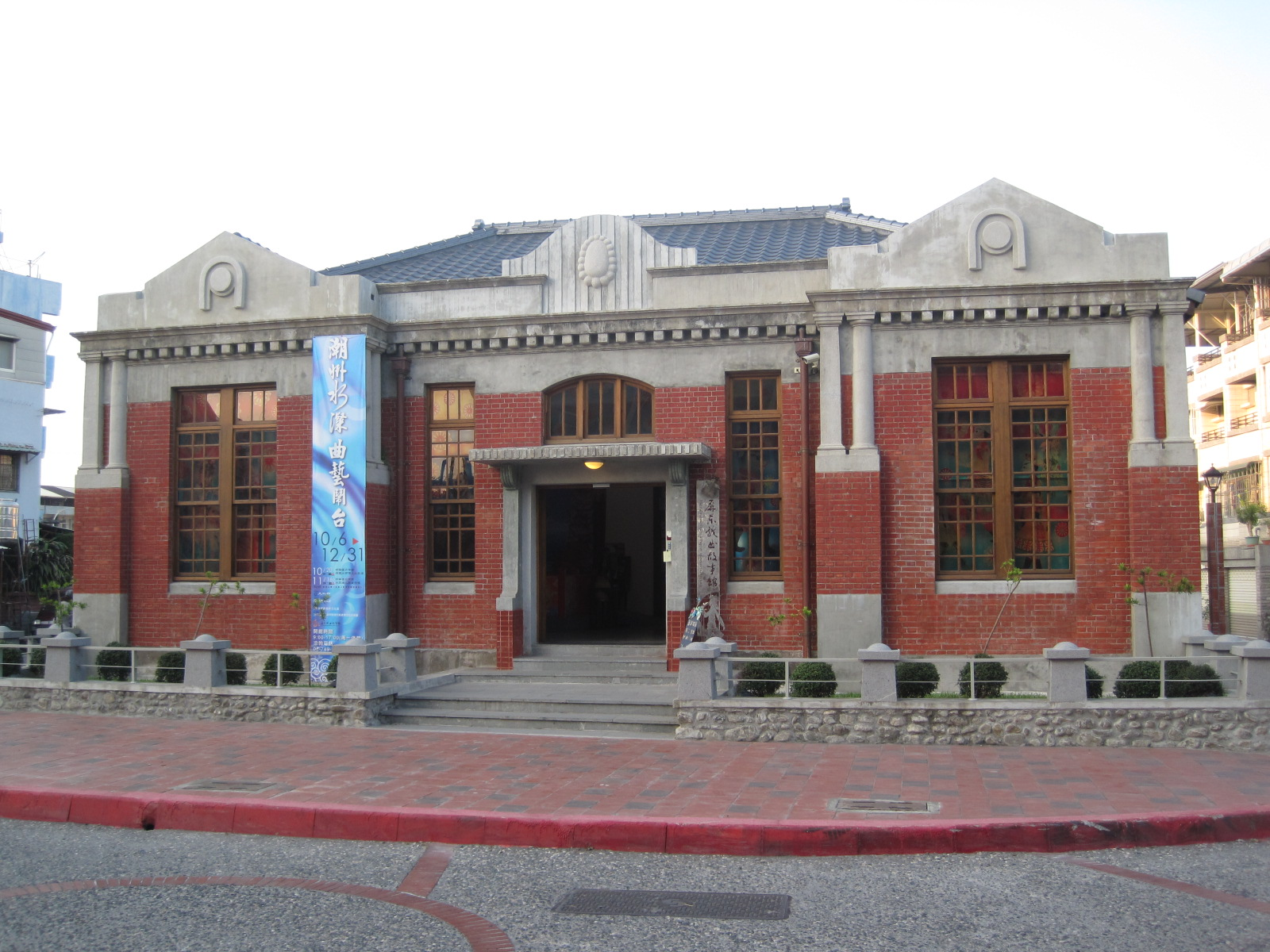
- Old Chaozhou Town Hall now the Museum of Traditional Theater

- Chaozhou Township in Pingtung County
- Location: Pingtung County, Taiwan

Area
  - Total: 42 km^{2} (16 sq mi)

Population (February 2024)
  - Total: 53,338
  - Density: 1,300/km^{2} (3,300/sq mi)
- Website: www.chaujou.gov.tw (in Chinese)

Chaozhou Township
- Traditional Chinese: 潮州鎮
- Hanyu Pinyin: Cháozhōu Zhèn
- Tongyong Pinyin: Cháojhou Jhèn
- Pha̍k-fa-sṳ: Tshèu-chû-tsṳ́n
- Hokkien POJ: Tiô-chiu-tìn

Chaozhou Township (also spelled Chaojhou, Chaochou; Chinese: 潮州鎮) is an urban township in western Pingtung County, Taiwan.

== Name ==
Chaozhou is named after Chaozhou, a city in eastern Guangdong, China. According to some historians, settlers from that city landed here in 1724, and thus named this area after their hometown.

== Geography ==
The township is located in the western side of Pingtung County at the Pingtung Plain. It has an area of 42.43 square kilometres (16.38 sq mi) and a population of 53,338 people as of February 2024.

== Administrative divisions ==
Villages in Chaozhou Township: 1 Chaozhou, 2 Tongrong, 3 Xinrong, 4 Xinsheng, 5 Sanhe, 6 Wukui, 7 Penglai, 8 Yongchun, 9 Fuchun, 10 Guanghua, 11 Sangong, 12 Sanxing, 13 Pengcheng, 14 Baye, 15 Guangchun, 16 Xingmei, 17 Shezi, 18 Jiukuai, 19 Lundong, 20 Silin, 21 Sichun

The township comprises 21 villages: Baye, Chaozhou, Fuchun, Guangchun, Guanghua, Jiukuai, Lundong, Pengcheng, Penglai, Sangong, Sanhe, Sanxing, Shezi, Sichun, Silin, Tongrong, Wukui, Xingmei, Xinrong, Xinsheng and Yongchun.

== Education ==
=== Language ===
Many inhabitants speak the Taiwanese Hokkien language. The original Chaoshan language spoken by the inhabitants has now been completely forgotten due to assimilation.

=== Senior high schools ===
- National Chao-Chou Senior High School
- Jih Hsin Insdustrial and Commercial Vocational Senior School (日新高級工商職業學校)

=== Junior high schools ===
- Pingtung County Chaozhou Junior High School (屏東縣立潮州國民中學)
- Pingtung County Guangchun Junior High School (屏東縣立光春國民中學)

=== Primary schools ===
- Chaozhou Primary School (屏東縣潮州鎮潮州國民小學)
- Guangchun Primary School (屏東縣潮州鎮光春國民小學)
- Silin Primary School (屏東縣潮州鎮四林國民小學)
- Chaonan Primary School (屏東縣潮州鎮潮南國民小學)
- Chaodong Primary School (屏東縣潮州鎮潮東國民小學)
- Chaosheng Primary School (屏東縣潮州鎮潮昇國民小學)
- Guanghua Primary School (屏東縣潮州鎮光華國民小學)
- Chaohe Primary School (屏東縣潮州鎮潮和國民小學)

== Tourist attractions ==
- Bada Forest Paradise
- Chaolin Temple
- Linhousilin Forest Park
- Museum of Traditional Theater

== Notable natives ==
- Ang Lee, film director and screenwriter
- Chen Bao-ji, Minister of Council of Agriculture (2012–2016)

== Transportation ==
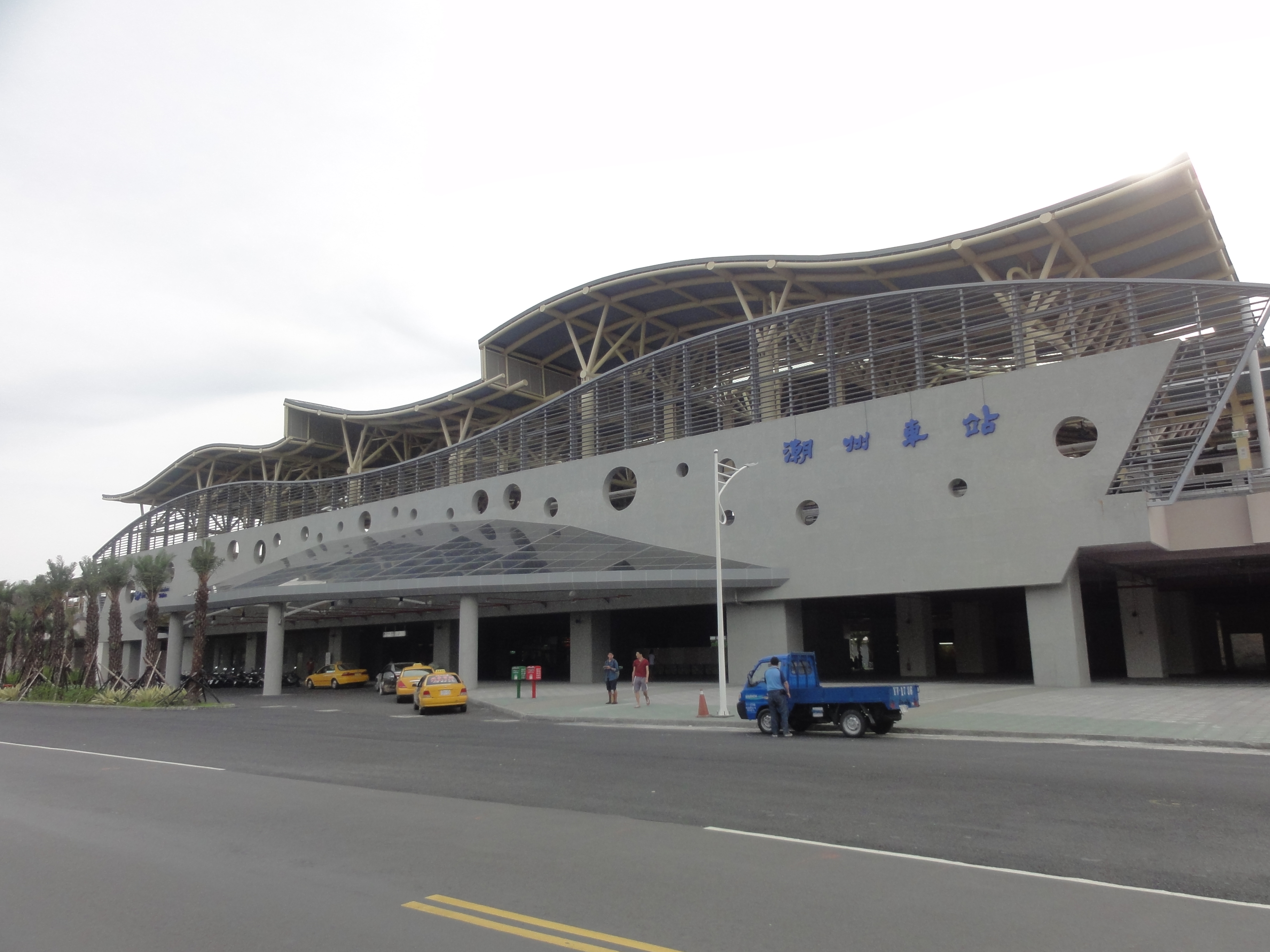
Chaozhou Station

=== Railway ===
- Taiwan Railway Pingtung Line
  - Chaozhou Station

=== Highway ===
- National Freeway 3
- Provincial Highway 88
  - Zhutian System Interchange
