= Zhutian railway station =

Railway station located in Pingtung, Taiwan

Zhutian Station 竹田車站
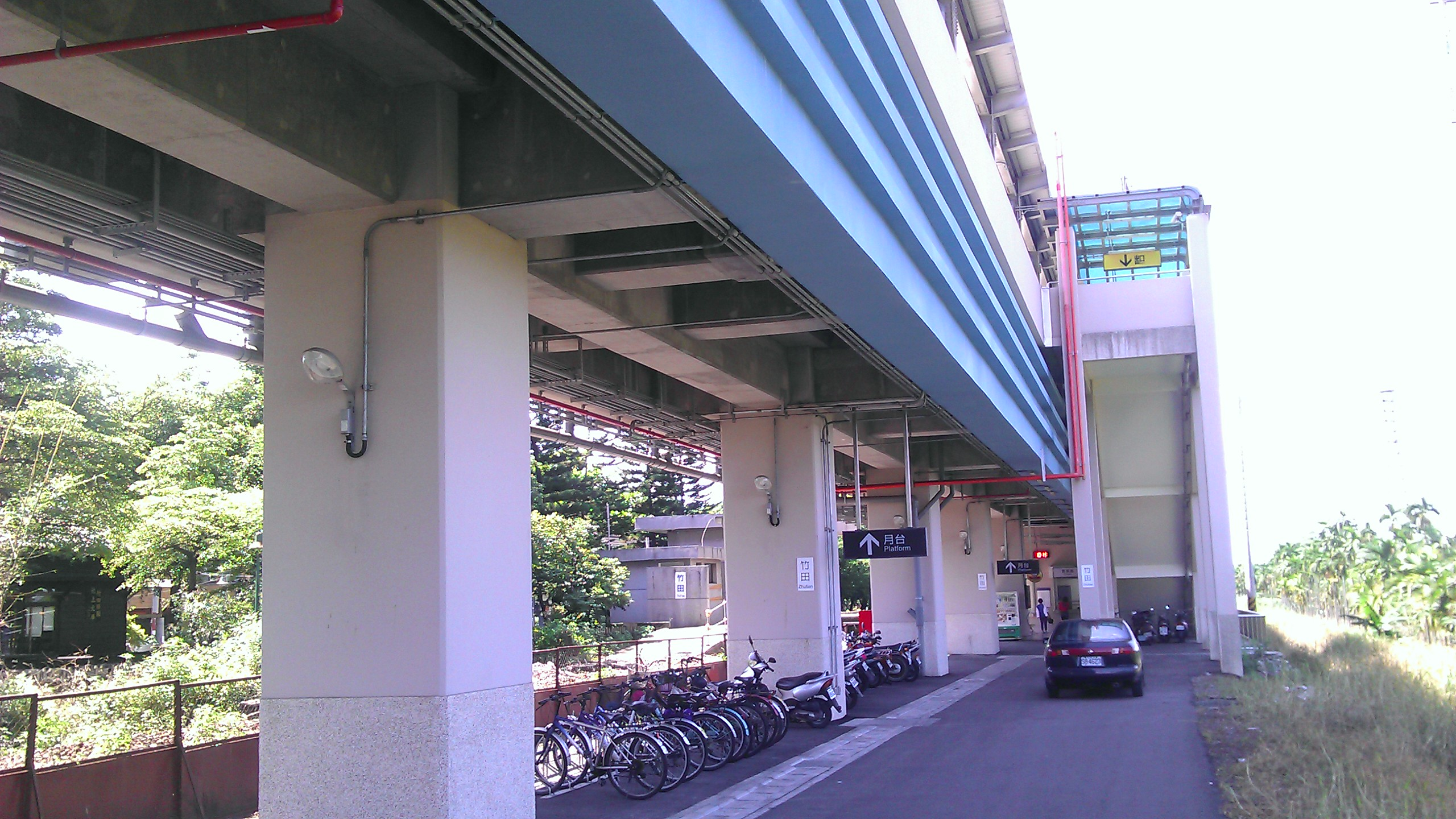
- Station entrance

Chinese name
- Traditional Chinese: 竹田車站
Transcriptions
Standard Mandarin
- Hanyu Pinyin: Zhútián Chēzhàn
- Bopomofo: ㄓㄨˊ ㄊㄧㄢˊ ㄔㄜ ㄓㄢˋ

General information
- Location: Zhutian, Pintung; Taiwan
- Coordinates: 22°35′11.5″N 120°32′23.5″E
- System: Taiwan Railway railway station
- Line: Pingtung line
- Distance: 32.0 km to Kaohsiung
- Platforms: 2 side platforms

Construction
- Structure type: Elevated

Other information
- Station code: 193

History
- Opened: 16 November 1919; 106 years ago

Passengers
- 2017: 88,413 per year
- Rank: 151

Services
| Preceding station | Taiwan Railway | Following station |
|---|---|---|
| Xishi towards Kaohsiung | Western Trunk line (Pingtung) | Chaozhou towards Fangliao |
Location

Zhutian railway station (Chinese: 竹田車站; pinyin: Zhútián Chēzhàn) is a railway station located in Zhutian Township, Pingtung County, Taiwan. It is on the Pingtung line and is operated by Taiwan Railway. Zhutian station is the only station on the Pingtung line where the wooden station building built during Japan's rule over Taiwan remains; it is not in use.
