= Nanzhou railway station =

Railway station located in Pingtung, Taiwan

Nanzhou Station 南州車站
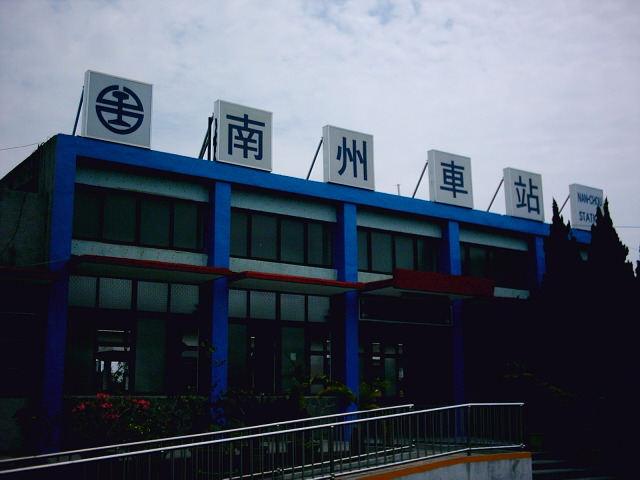
- Station entrance

Chinese name
- Traditional Chinese: 南州車站
Transcriptions
Standard Mandarin
- Hanyu Pinyin: Nánzhōu Chēzhàn
- Bopomofo: ㄋㄢˊ ㄓㄡ ㄔㄜ ㄓㄢˋ

General information
- Location: Nanzhou, Pingtung; Taiwan
- Coordinates: 22°29′31.4″N 120°30′42.6″E
- System: Taiwan Railway railway station
- Line: Pingtung line
- Distance: 43.3 km to Kaohsiung
- Platforms: 2 island platforms

Construction
- Structure type: At-grade

Other information
- Station code: 197

History
- Opened: 11 October 1923

Passengers
- 2017: 188,954 per year
- Rank: 133

Services
Preceding station	Taiwan Railway	Following station
Kanding towards Kaohsiung	Western Trunk line (Pingtung)	Zhen'an towards Fangliao
Location

Nanzhou railway station (Chinese: 南州車站; pinyin: Nánzhōu Chēzhàn) is a railway station located in Nanzhou Township, Pingtung County, Taiwan. It is located on the Pingtung line and is operated by Taiwan Railway.
