= Chaozhou railway station =

Railway station in Chaozhou, Pingtung County, Taiwan

Chaozhou Station 潮州車站
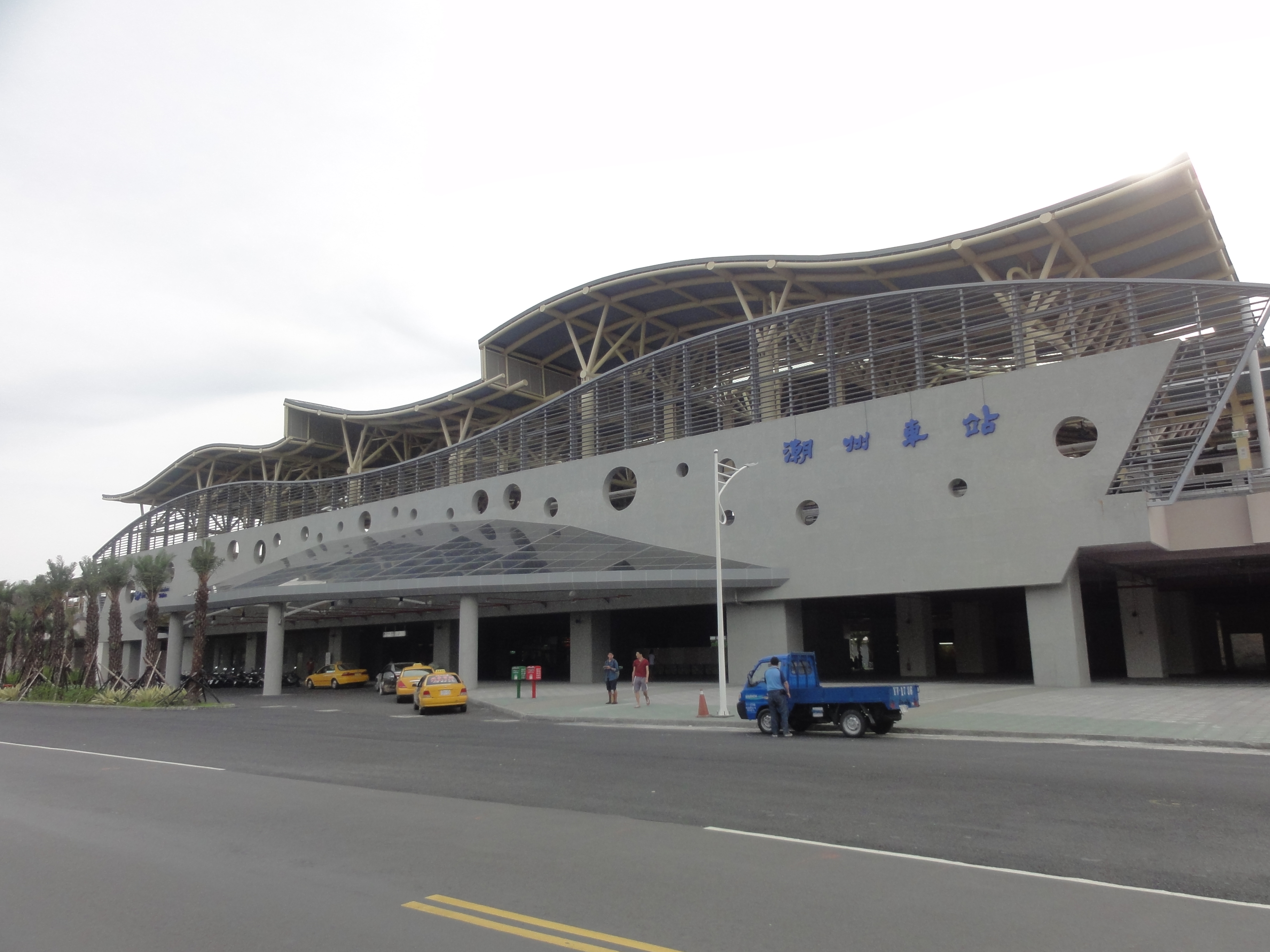

General information
- Location: Chaozhou, Pingtung County, Taiwan
- Coordinates: 22°33′00.7″N 120°32′9.2″E
- System: Train station
- Owner: Taiwan Railway Corporation
- Operator: Taiwan Railway Corporation
- Line: Western Trunk line (Pingtung)
- Train operators: Taiwan Railway Corporation

History
- Opened: 22 February 1920

Passengers
- 8,028 daily (2024)
Location

Chaozhou (Chinese: 潮州車站; pinyin: Cháozhōu Chēzhàn) is a railway station on Taiwan Railway (TR) Pingtung line located in Chaozhou Township, Pingtung County, Taiwan.

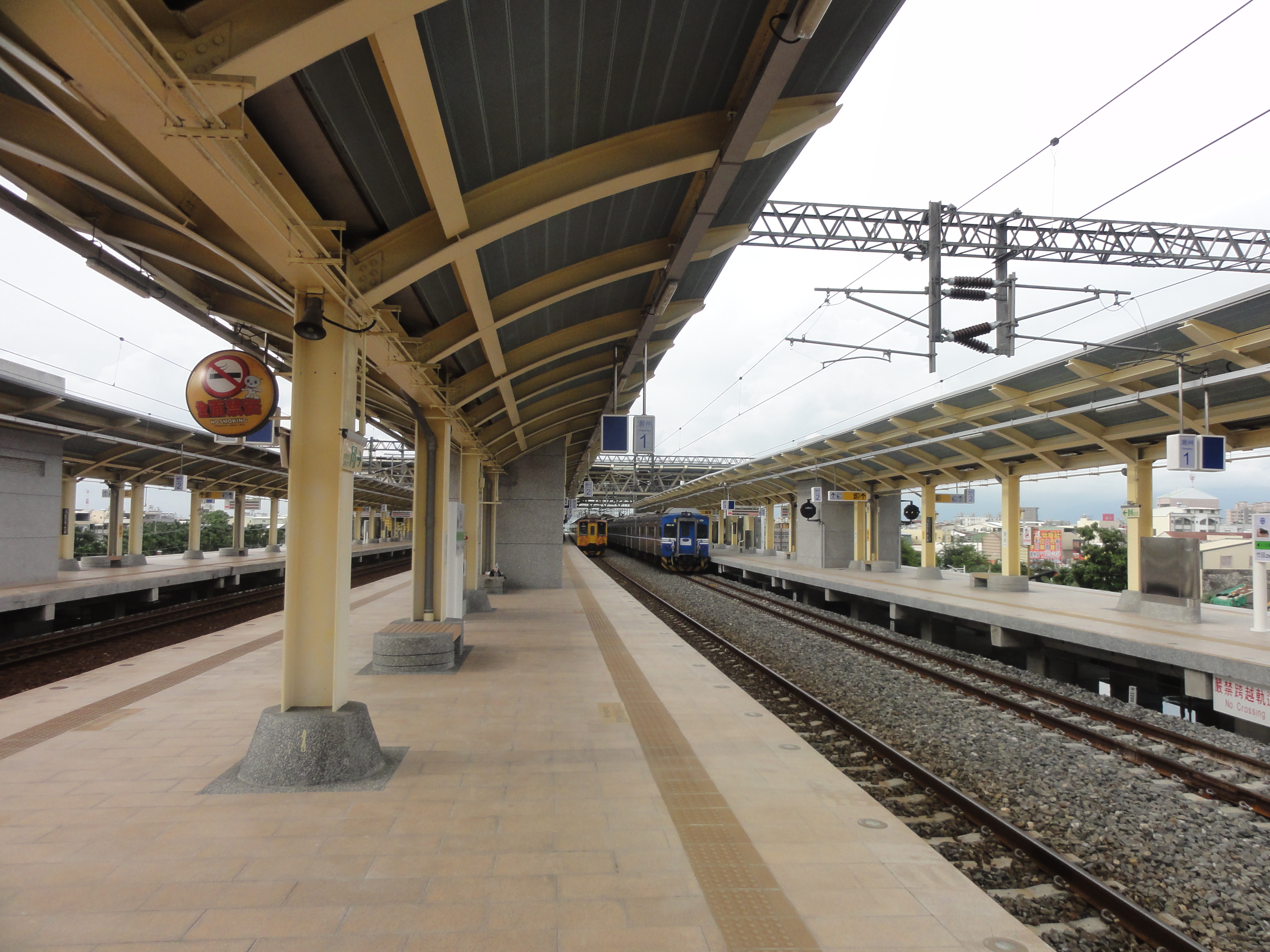
Chaozhou station platform

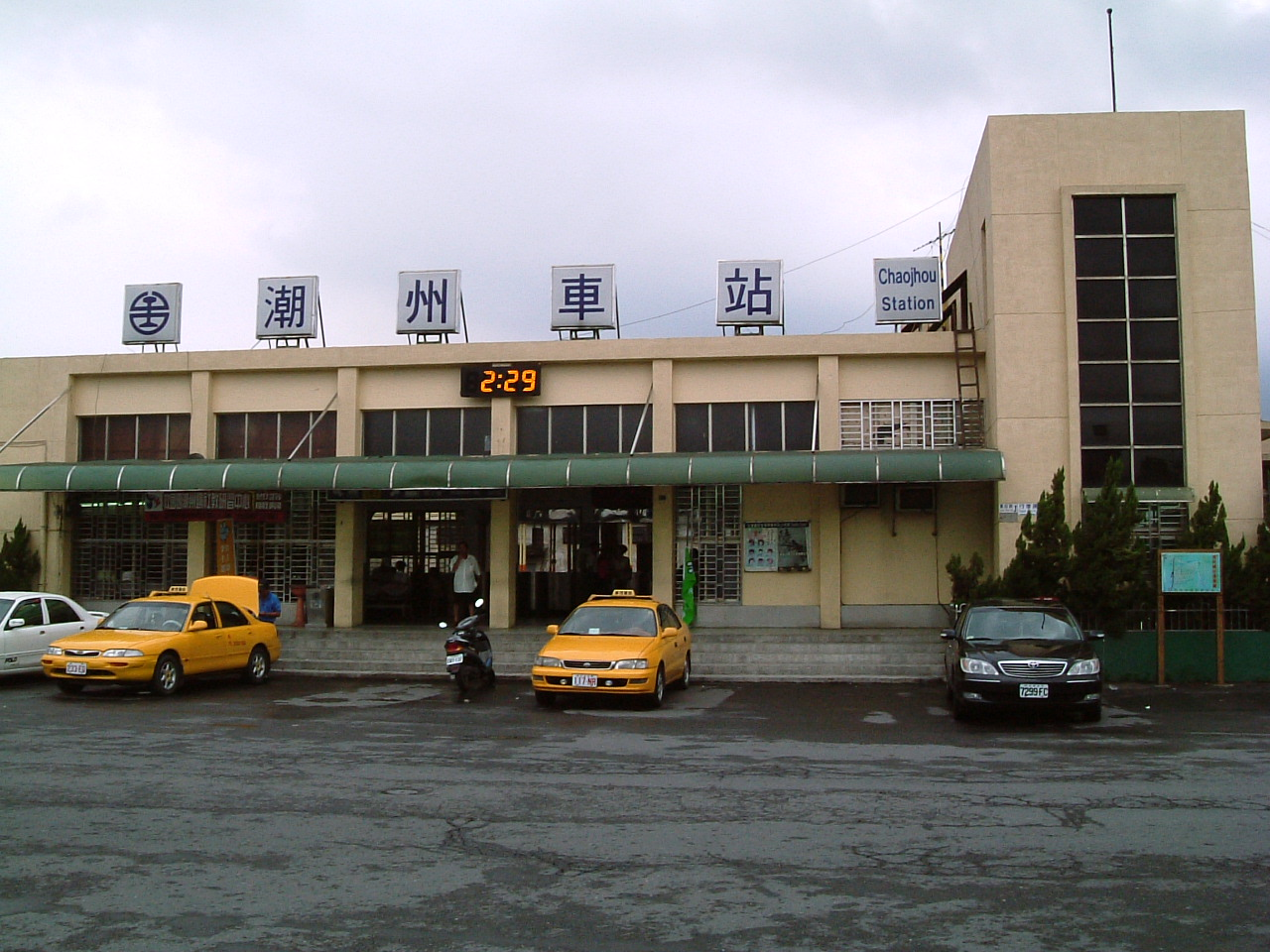
Former Chaozhou station

== History ==
The station was opened on 22 February 1920.

== Around the station ==
- Bada Forest Paradise
- Museum of Traditional Theater

== See also ==
- List of railway stations in Taiwan

Preceding station	Taiwan Railway	Following station
Zhutian towards Kaohsiung	Western Trunk line (Pingtung)	Kanding towards Fangliao
