= Zhen'an railway station =

Railway station located in Pingtung, Taiwan

Zhen'an Station 鎮安車站
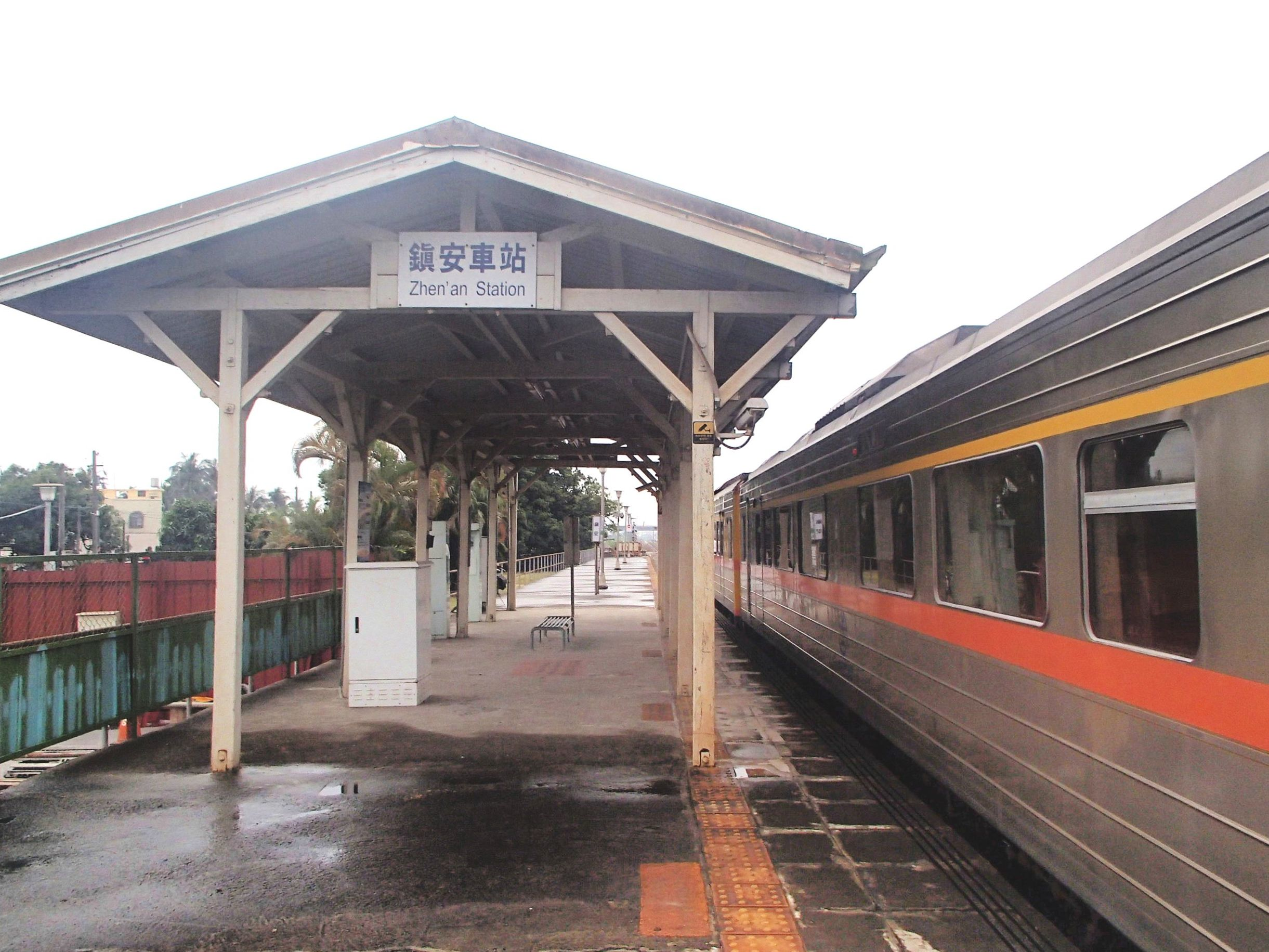
- Station platform

Chinese name
- Traditional Chinese: 鎮安車站
Transcriptions
Standard Mandarin
- Hanyu Pinyin: Zhènān Chēzhàn
- Bopomofo: ㄓㄣˋ ㄢ ㄔㄜ ㄓㄢˋ

General information
- Location: Linbian, Pingtung County, Taiwan
- Coordinates: 22°27′28.6″N 120°30′40.5″E
- System: Taiwan Railway railway station
- Line: Pingtung line
- Distance: 46.9 km to Kaohsiung
- Platforms: 1 side platform

Construction
- Structure type: At-grade

Other information
- Station code: 198

History
- Opened: 19 July 1940

Passengers
- 2017: 4,837 per year
- Rank: 216

Services
Preceding station	Taiwan Railway	Following station
Nanzhou towards Kaohsiung	Western Trunk line (Pingtung)	Linbian towards Fangliao
Location

Zhen'an railway station (Chinese: 鎮安車站; pinyin: Zhènān Chēzhàn) is a railway station located in Linbian Township, Pingtung County, Taiwan. It is located on the Pingtung line and is operated by Taiwan Railway. The defunct Donggang line branched off from this station.

When the station was opened in 1940, it had two side platforms, one for the Pingtung line and the other for the Donggang line. However, when the Donggang line closed in 1991, the second platform was abandoned. On October 16, 2019, the second platform was rebuilt to serve a second track built between Nanzhou and Linbian as part of the Pingtung line's electrification process.
