= Jiadong =

Rural township in Pingtung County, Taiwan

Coordinates: 22.430547°N 120.547115°E

Jiadong Township 佳冬鄉
- Rural township
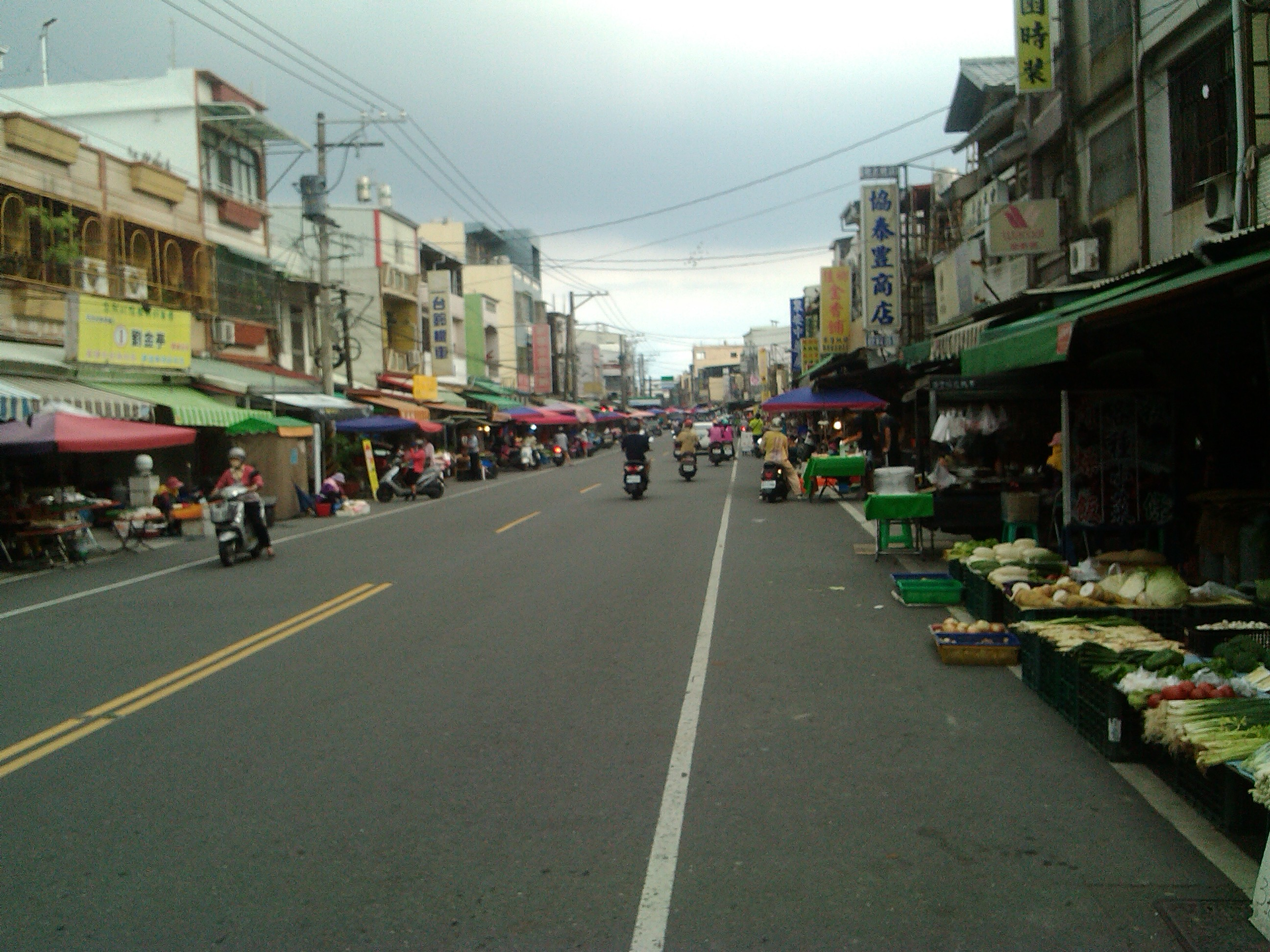

- Jiadong Township in Pingtung County
- Location: Pingtung County, Taiwan

Area
  - Total: 31 km^{2} (12 sq mi)

Population (February 2024)
  - Total: 17,838
  - Density: 580/km^{2} (1,500/sq mi)

Jiadong Township (also spelled Jiadung; Chinese: 佳冬鄉; pinyin: Jiādōng Xiāng; Wade–Giles: Chia^{1}-tung^{1} Hsiang^{1}; Pe̍h-ōe-jī: Ka-tang-hiong) is a rural township in Pingtung County, Taiwan.

== History ==
Formerly called Katangkha (Chinese: 茄苳腳; Pe̍h-ōe-jī: Ka-tang-kha)., Jiadong Township was originally the residence of the Makatao people of Pingpu tribe. The first colonists that began arriving into Jiadong were ethnic Hakkas from northeastern Guangdong, establishing the town and ultimately assimilating the local native Makatao aborigines.

Jiadong was the location of the Battle of Chiatung, an engagement in the Japanese invasion of Taiwan. The battle took place on the 11 October 1895, and ended in a Japanese victory and a defeat for the Republic of Formosa. In 1895 the township was described by James W. Davidson as a village "surrounded by a low stone wall loop-holed for rifle fire". He also describes "A body of water, which nearly surrounded the village". During the battle, Japanese forces set several of the houses on fire.

== Geography ==
It has a population total of 17,838 and an area of 31 square kilometres (12 sq mi).

== Administrative divisions ==
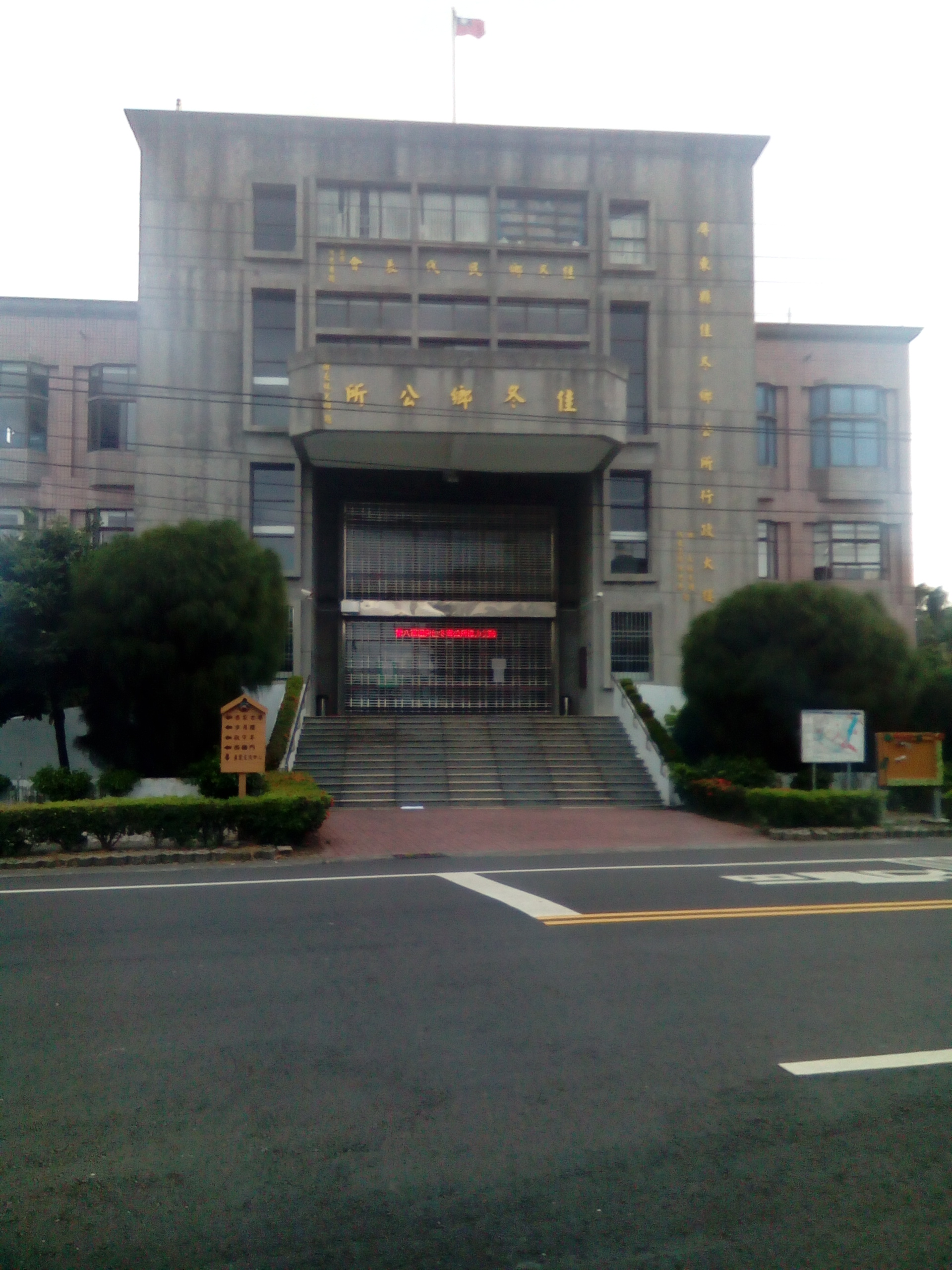
Jiadong Township Office

The township comprises 12 villages: Changlong, Datong, Fenglong, Jiadong, Laijia, Liugen, Qiangyuan, Shiguang, Wanjian, Wenfeng, Yanwen and Yuguang.

== Tourist attractions ==
- Old House of Siiao Family
- Yang Family Ancestral Hall

== Transportation ==
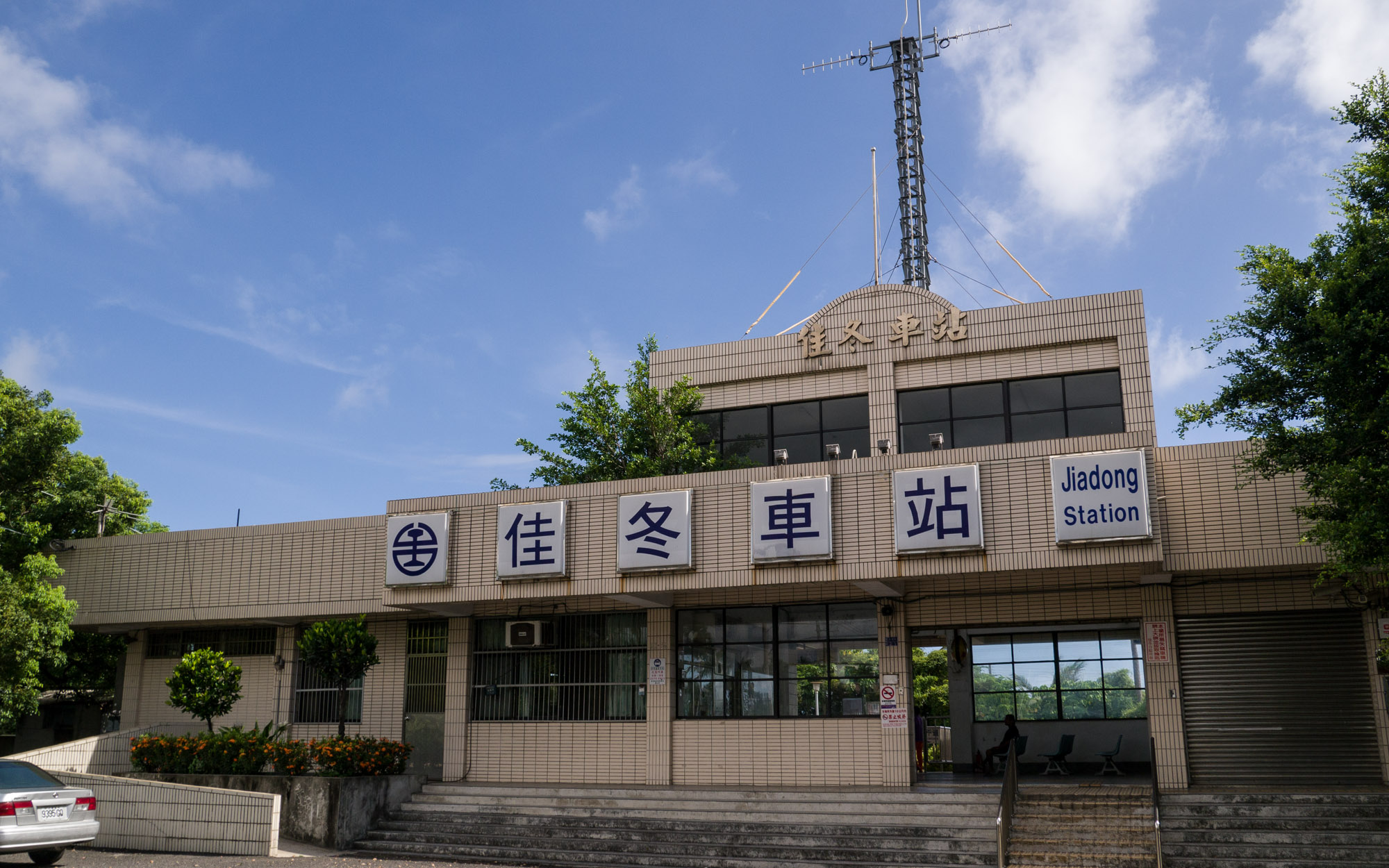
Jiadong Station

- TR Jiadong Station

== Notable natives ==
- Chung Mong-hong, film director, screenwriter and cinematographer
