= Kanding railway station =

Railway station located in Pingtung, Taiwan

Kanding Station 崁頂車站
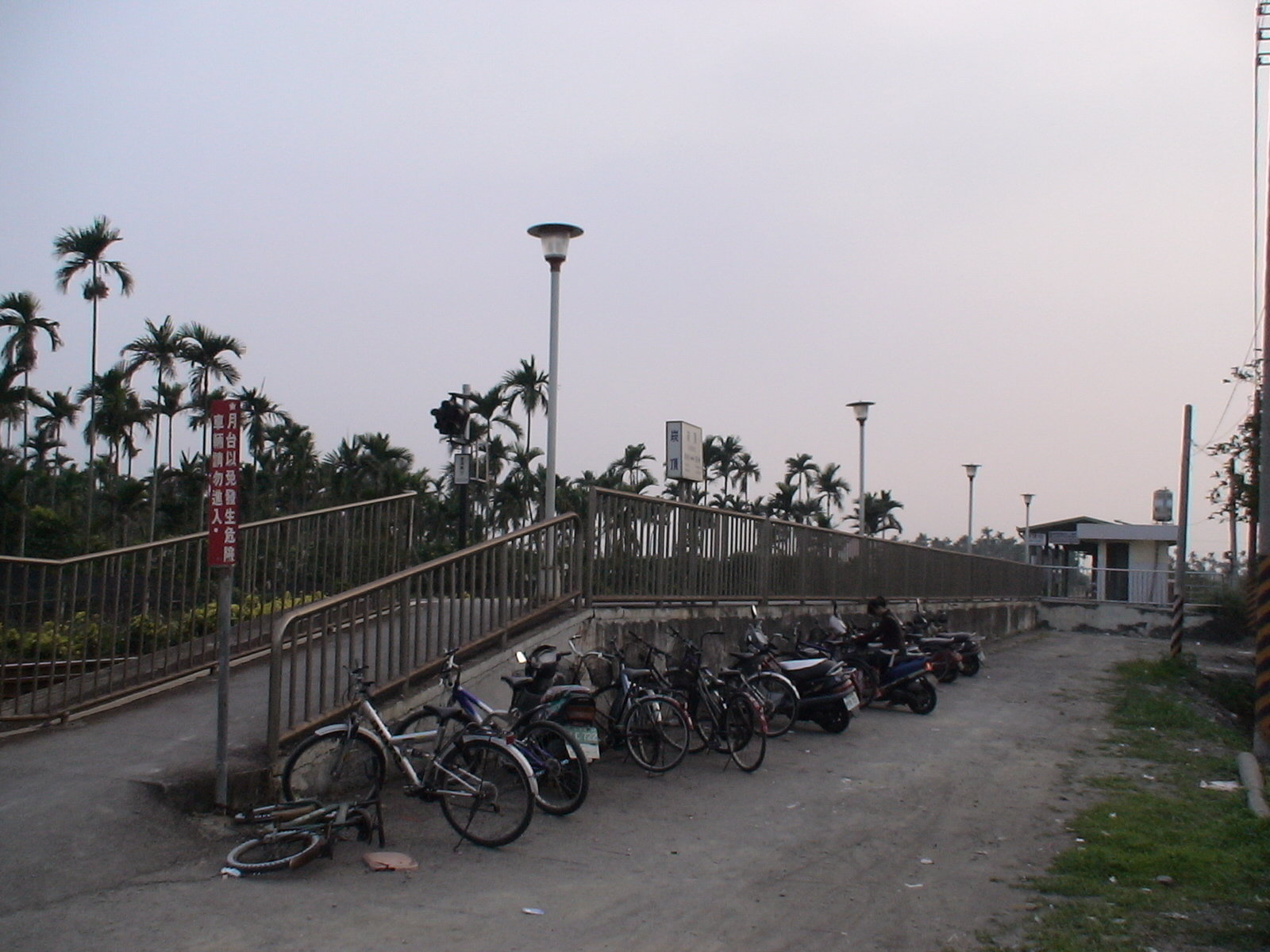

Chinese name
- Traditional Chinese: 崁頂車站
Transcriptions
Standard Mandarin
- Hanyu Pinyin: Kǎndǐng Chēzhàn
- Bopomofo: ㄎㄢˇ ㄉㄧㄥˇ ㄔㄜ ㄓㄢˋ

General information
- Location: Kanding, Pingtung; Taiwan
- Coordinates: 22°30′47.1″N 120°30′53.5″E
- System: Taiwan Railway railway station
- Line: Pingtung line
- Distance: 40.9 km to Kaohsiung
- Platforms: 1 side platform

Construction
- Structure type: At-grade

Other information
- Station code: 280

History
- Opened: 24 November 1952

Passengers
- 2017: 45,684 per year
- Rank: 169

Services
Preceding station	Taiwan Railway	Following station
Chaozhou towards Kaohsiung	Western Trunk line (Pingtung)	Nanzhou towards Fangliao
Location

Kanding railway station (Chinese: 崁頂車站; pinyin: Kǎndǐng Chēzhàn) is a railway station located in Kanding Township, Pingtung, Taiwan. It is located on the Pingtung line and is operated by Taiwan Railway.
