= Zhutian =

Rural township in Pingtung County, Taiwan

Coordinates: 22.588971°N 120.530266°E

Zhutian Township 竹田鄉 Takeda
- Rural township
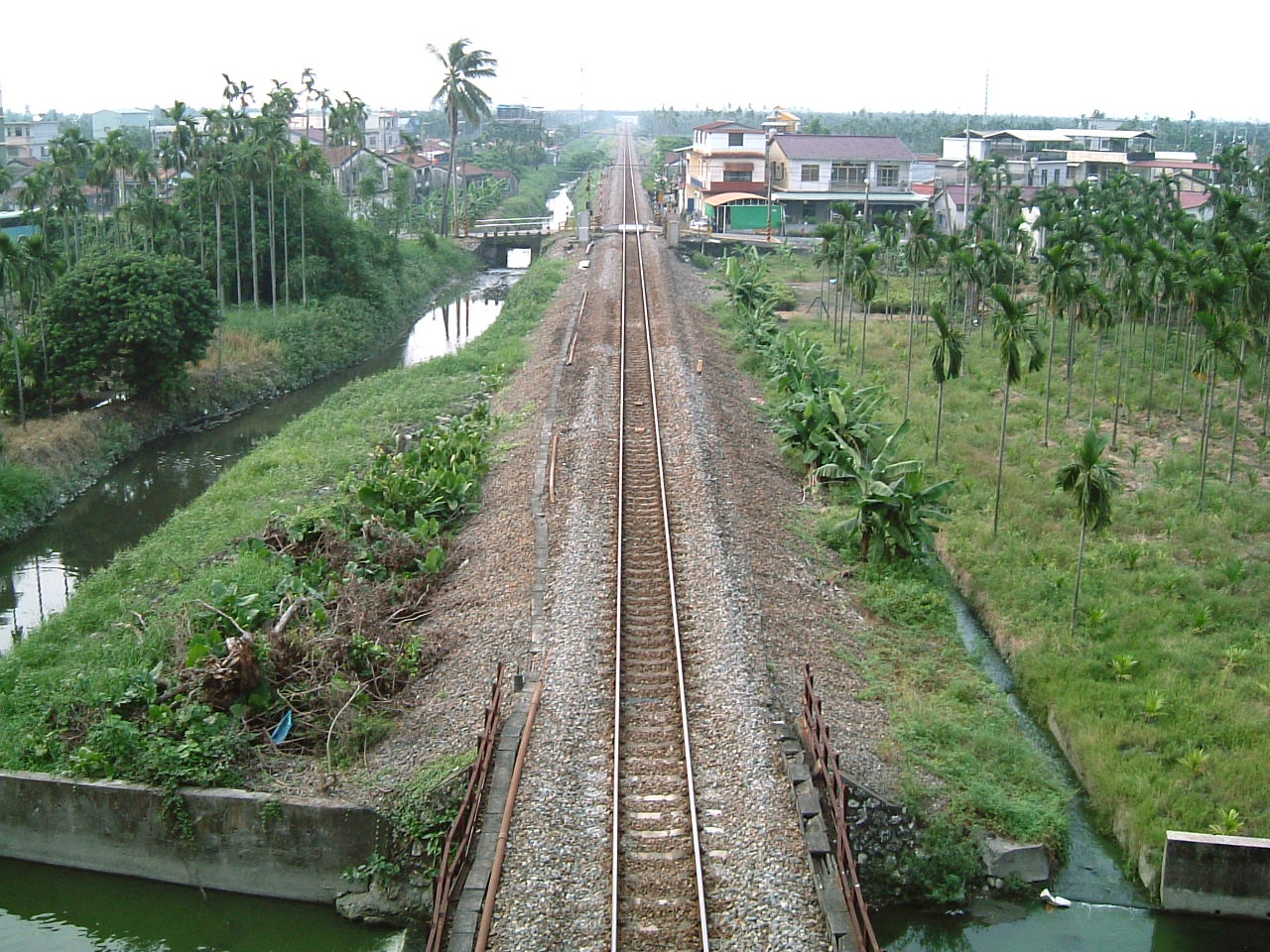

- Zhutian Township in Pingtung County
- Location: Pingtung County, Taiwan

Area
  - Total: 29 km^{2} (11 sq mi)

Population (February 2024)
  - Total: 15,757
  - Density: 540/km^{2} (1,400/sq mi)

Zhutian Township
- Traditional Chinese: 竹田鄉
- Literal meaning: bamboo field township
- Hanyu Pinyin: Zhútián Xiāng
- Wade–Giles: Chu^{2}-t'ien^{2} Hsiang^{1}
- Tongyong Pinyin: Jhútián Siang
- Pha̍k-fa-sṳ: Tsuk-thièn-hiông
- Hokkien POJ: Tek-chhân-hiong

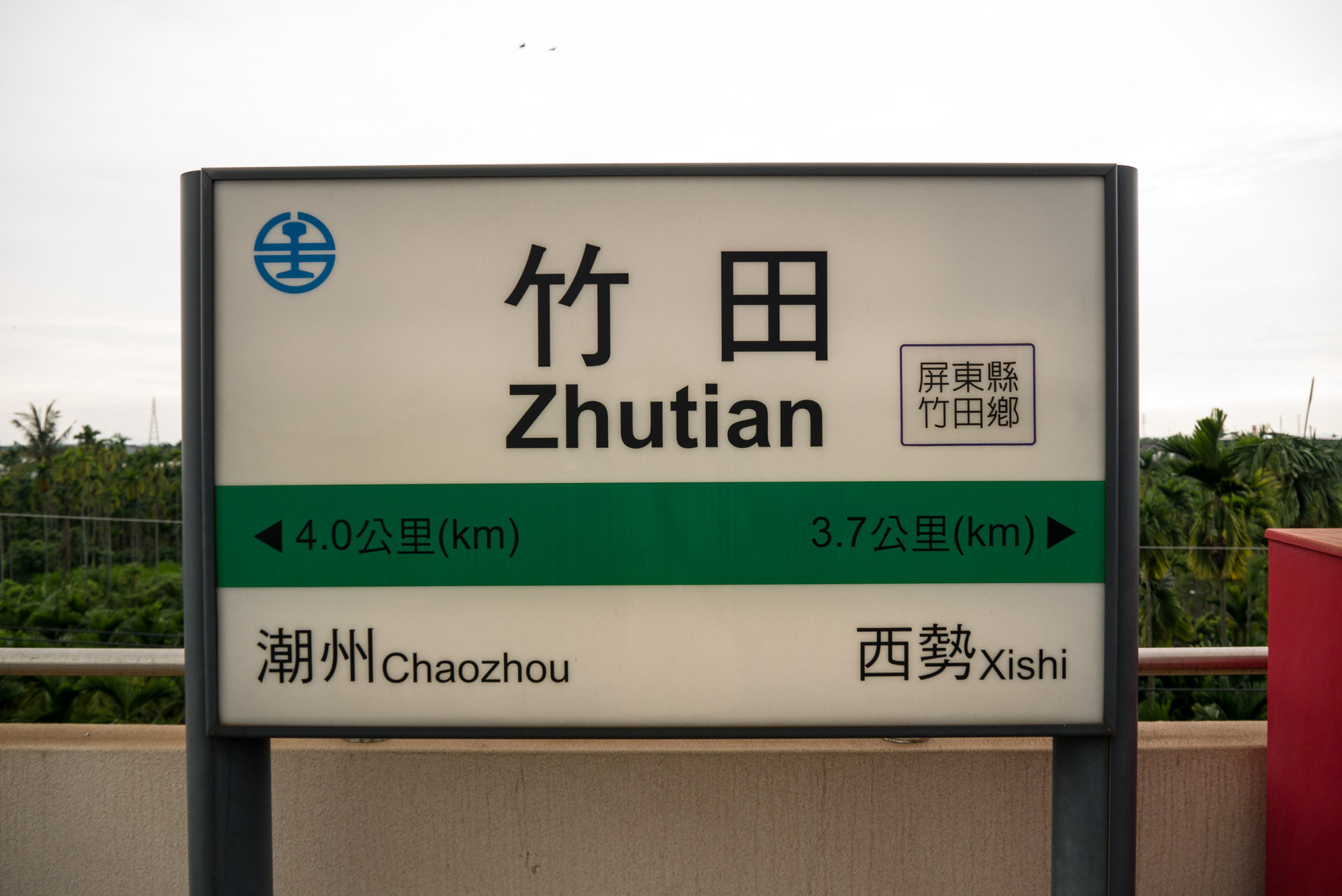
Zhutian Station

Zhutian Township, also spelled Jhutian, is a rural township in Pingtung County, Taiwan.

== Geography ==
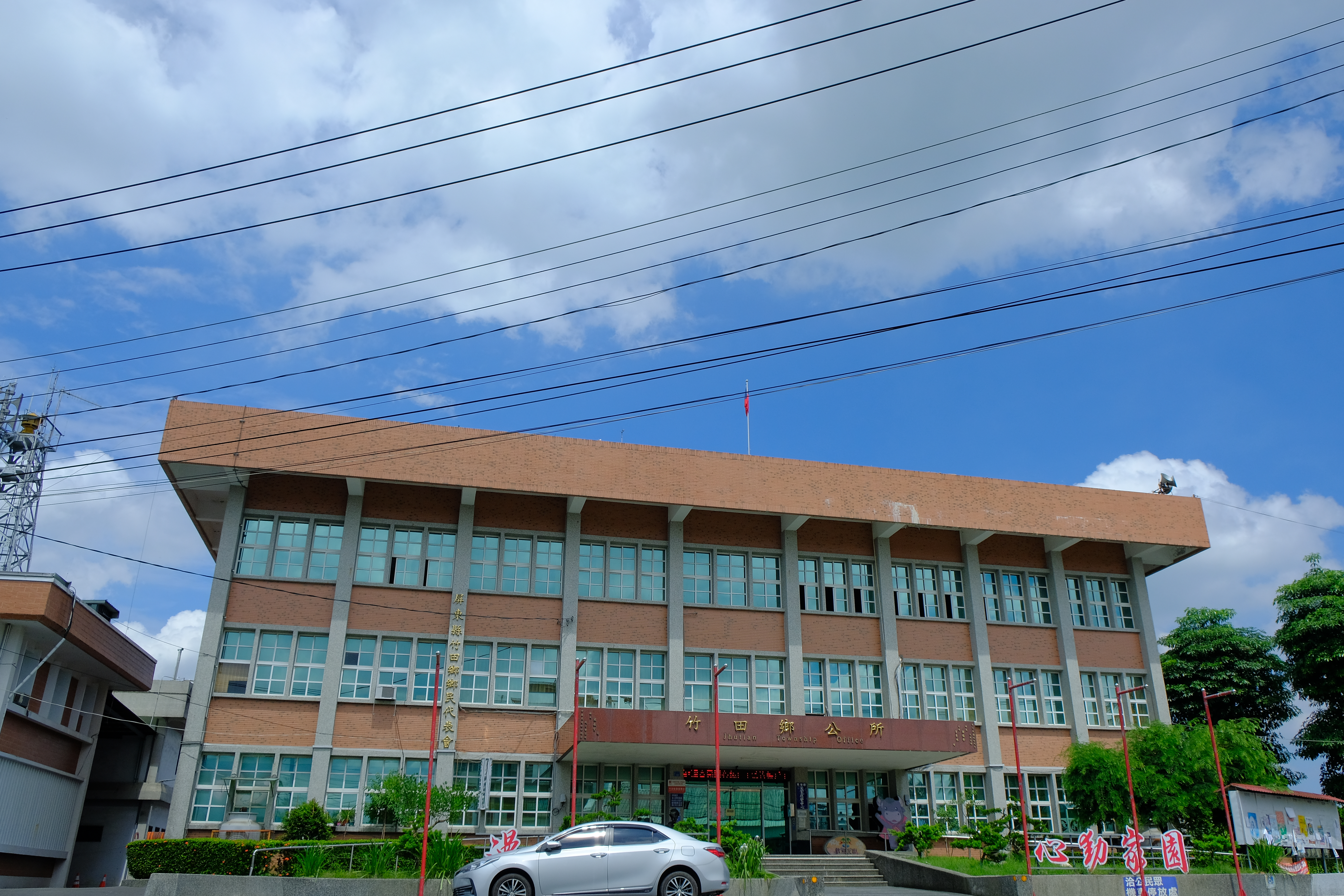
Jhutian Township Office

- Population: 15,757 people (February 2024)
- Area: 29.07 square kilometres (11.22 sq mi)
- Main ethnic group: Hakka

== Administrative divisions ==
The township comprises 15 villages:

- Dahu (大湖村)
- Erlun (二崙村)
- Fengming (鳳明村)
- Futian (福田村)
- Liuxiang (六巷村)
- Lufeng (履豐村)
- Meilun (美崙村)
- Nanshi (南勢村)
- Sizhou (泗洲村)
- Tiaodi (糶糴村)
- Toulun (頭崙村)
- Xishi (西勢村)
- Yongfeng (永豐村)
- Zhunan (竹南村)
- Zhutian (竹田村)

== Economy ==
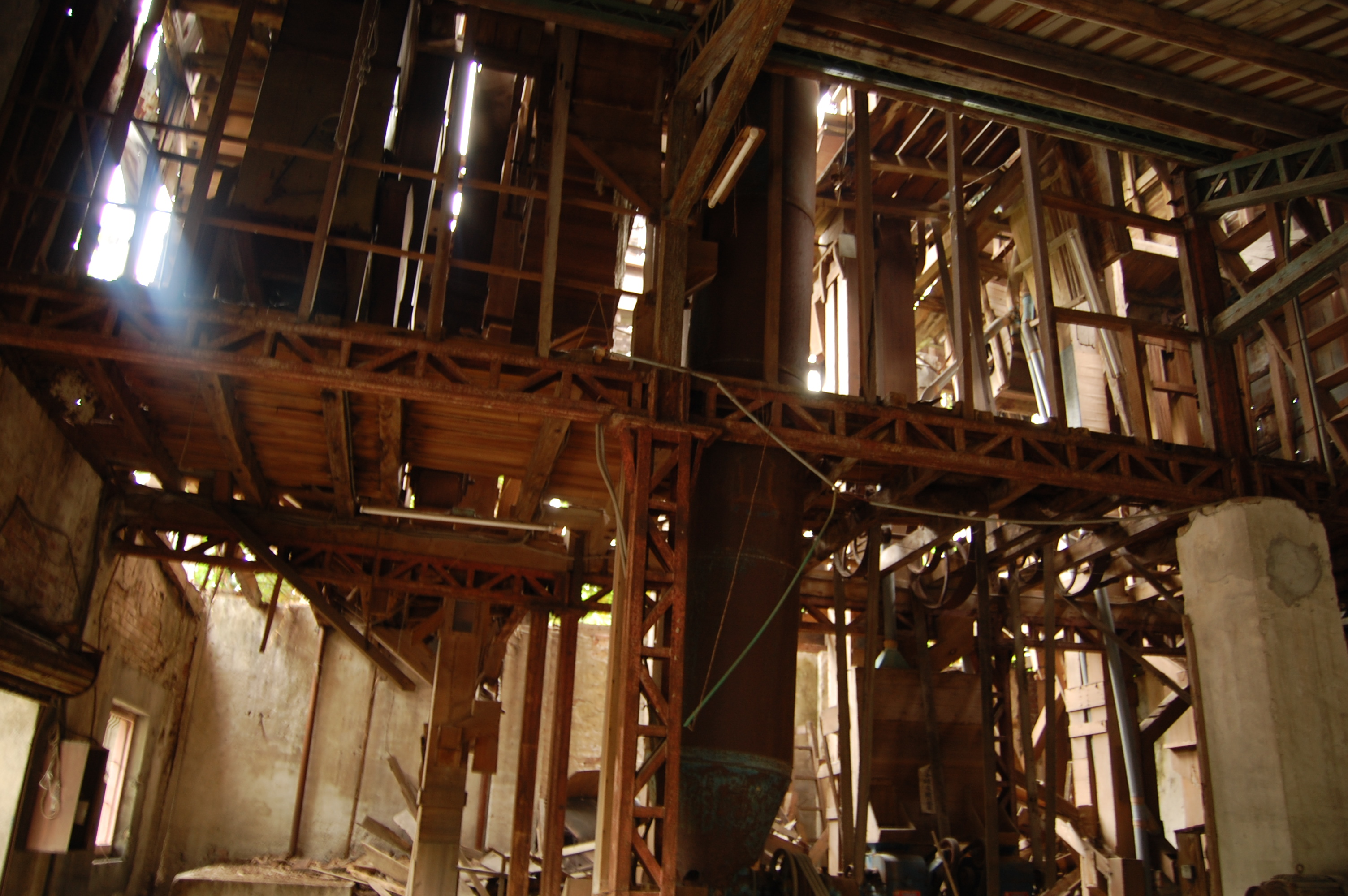
Rice factory in Zhutian

Zhutian is famous for its agricultural products.

== Tourist attractions ==
- Pingtung Hakka Cultural Museum

== Transportation ==
=== Rails ===
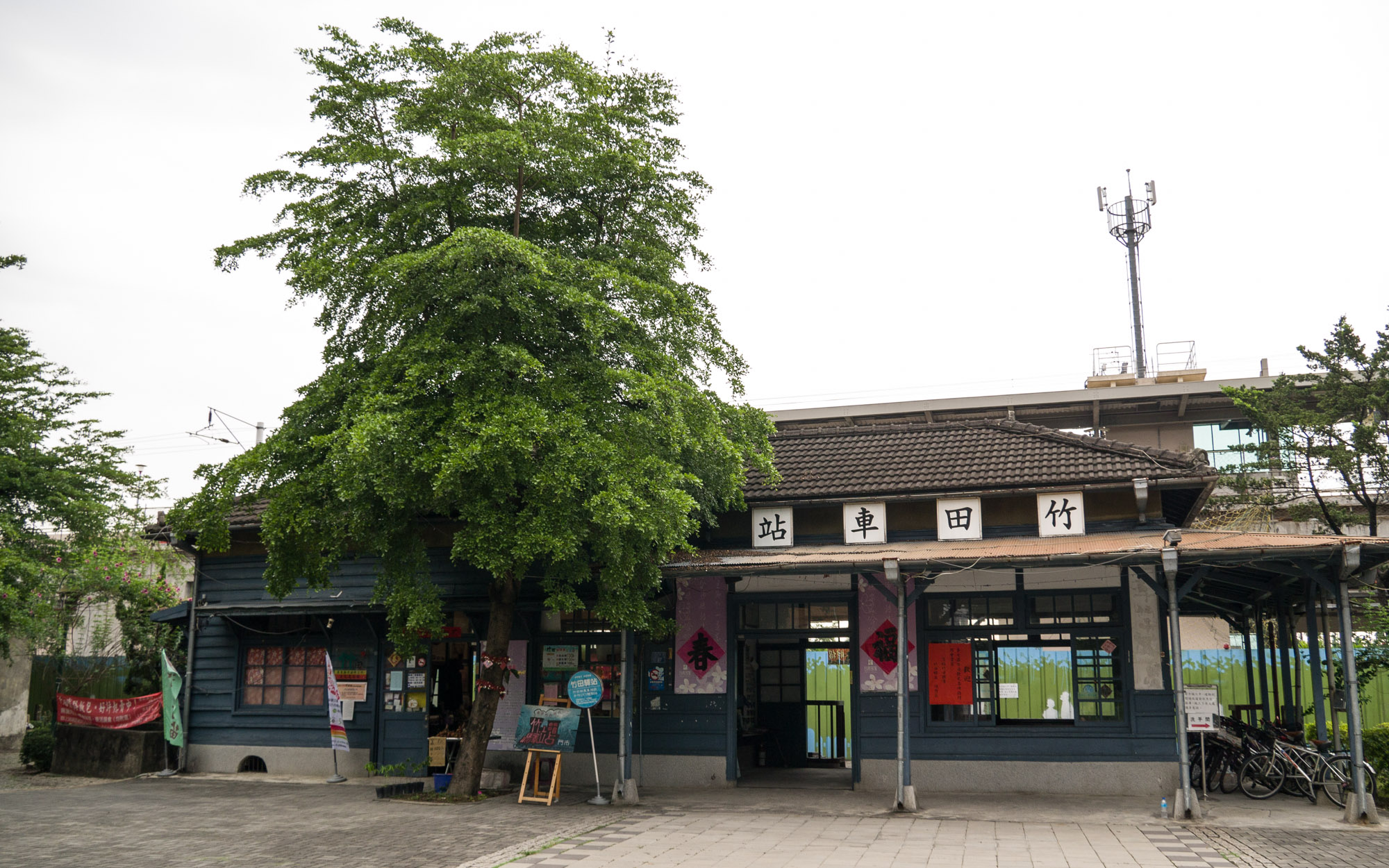
Zhutian Station

- TR Xishi Station
- TR Zhutian Station

=== Roads ===
The township is connected to Kaohsiung at Fengshan District through Provincial Highway 88.
