= Linluo =

Rural township in Pingtung County, Taiwan

Coordinates: 22.6506°N 120.5271°E

Linluo Township 麟洛鄉
- Rural township
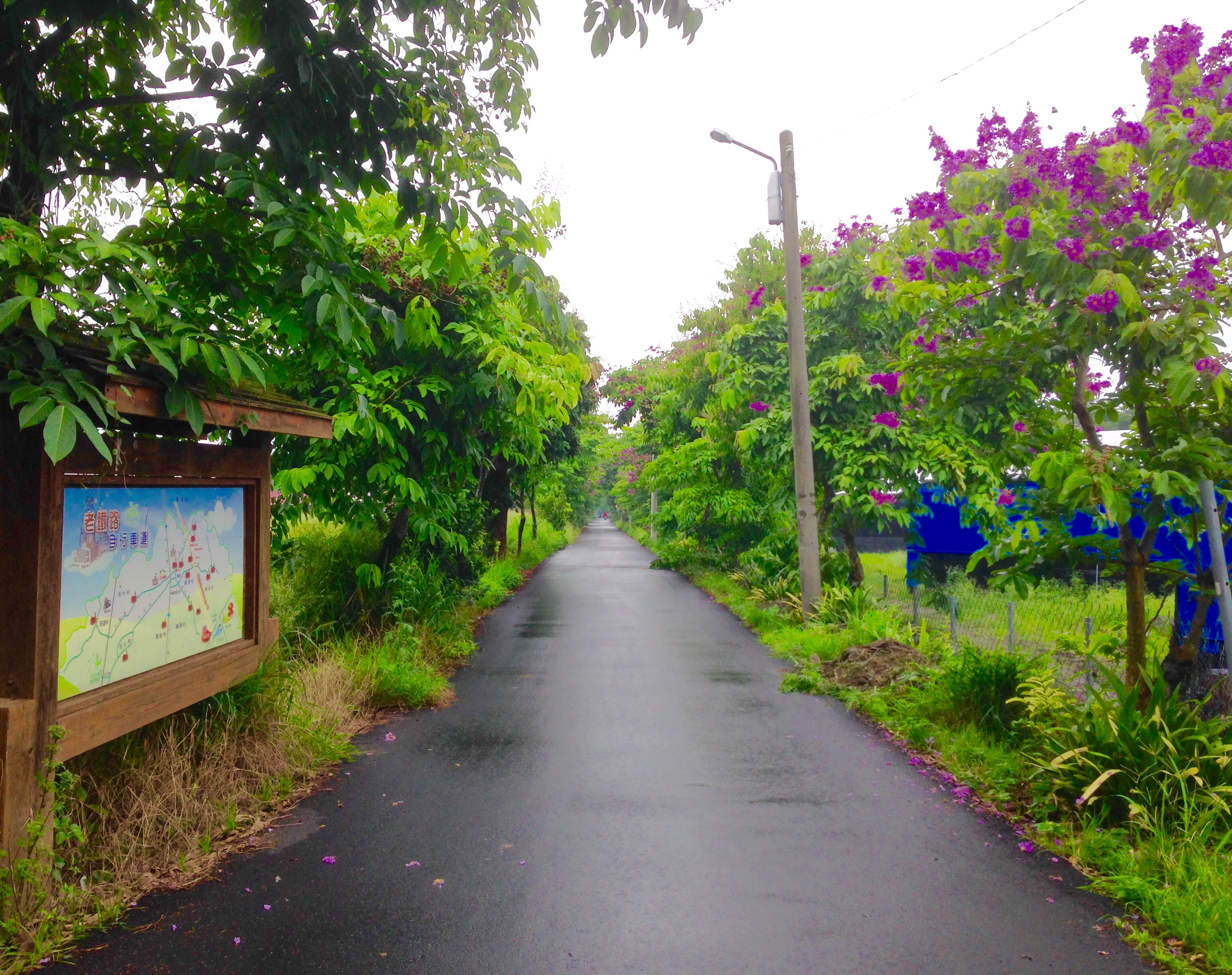

- Linluo Township in Pingtung County
- Interactive map of Linluo Township 麟洛鄉
- Location: Pingtung County, Taiwan

Area
  - Total: 16 km^{2} (6.2 sq mi)

Population (February 2024)
  - Total: 10,548
  - Density: 660/km^{2} (1,700/sq mi)

Linluo Township (Chinese: 麟洛鄉; pinyin: Línluò Xiāng) is a rural township in Pingtung County, Taiwan. It has a population total of 10,548 and an area of 16.26 square kilometres (6.28 sq mi).

== Administrative divisions ==
The township comprises seven villages: Linding, Linti, Linzhi, Tiandao, Tianxin, Tianzhong and Xintian.

== Transportation ==
- TR Linluo Station

== Notable natives ==
- Chiou Lien-hui, Magistrate of Pingtung County (1981–1985)
- Ella Chen, member of S.H.E
- Julia Peng, Taiwanese female singer
