= Southern Freeway (disambiguation) =

Southern Freeway may refer to:

- Southern Freeway, a freeway in New South Wales, Australia, now known as Princes Motorway
- Interstate 280 (California), original name Southern Freeway
- Tabriz Southern Freeway, Turkey
- Second Southern Highway that crosses Ligang Bridge, Taiwan
- Southern freeway near Ilz, Styria, Austria
- Southern Freeway, early name for the B921 Kinglassie Road, Glenrothes, Scotland
