= Jiuqutang railway station =

Railway station in Dashu, Kaohsiung, Taiwan

Jiuqutang Station 九曲堂車站
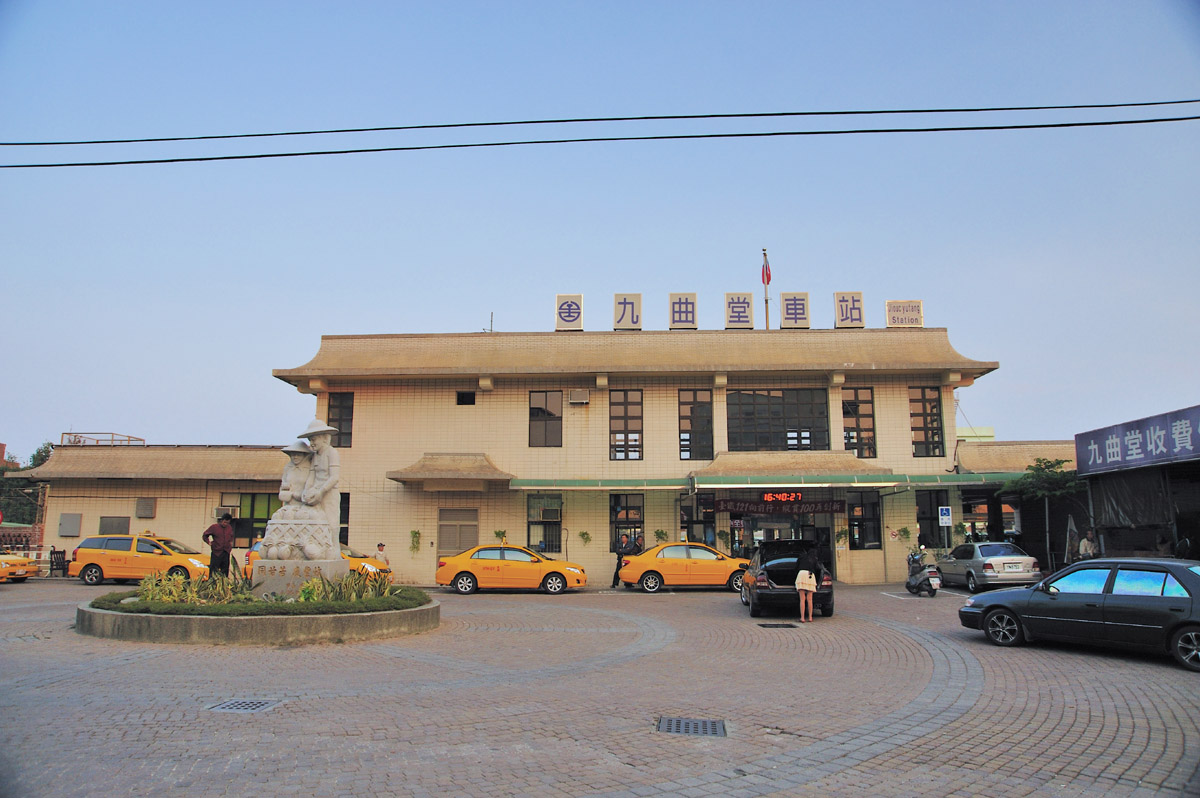

General information
- Location: Dashu, Kaohsiung City, Taiwan
- Coordinates: 22.656433°N 120.420948°E
- System: Train station
- Owner: Taiwan Railway Corporation
- Operator: Taiwan Railway Corporation
- Line: Western Trunk line (Pingtung)
- Train operators: Taiwan Railway Corporation

History
- Opened: 1 October 1907; 118 years ago

Passengers
- 2,503 daily (2024)
Location

Jiuqutang (Chinese: 九曲堂車站; Hanyu Pinyin: Jiǔqūtáng Chēzhàn; Tongyong Pinyin: Jiǒucyutáng Chejhàn), formerly spelled Jioucyutang, is a railway station on the Taiwan Railway Pingtung line located in Dashu District, Kaohsiung, Taiwan.

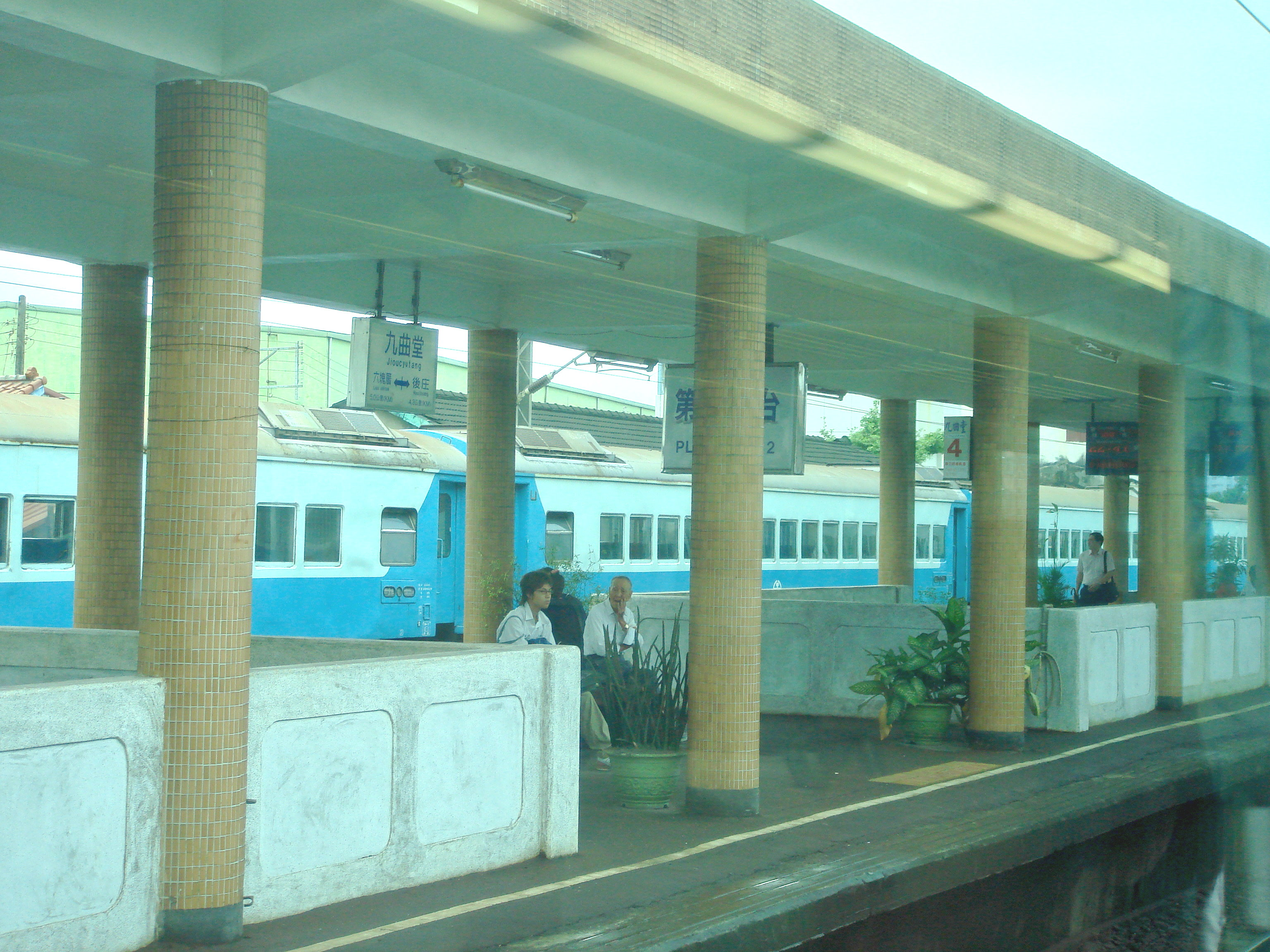
Jiuqutang station platform

== History ==
The station was opened on 1 October 1907. The current main station hall replaced the original 1907 station. Additional east exit with fully accessible overpass was added during renovations from 2016 to 2018.

== Around the station ==
- Sanhe Tile Kiln
- Taiwan Pineapple Museum
- Old Gaoping River Iron Bridge historic bridge spans Gaoping River and built during Japanese rule of Taiwan.

== See also ==
- List of railway stations in Taiwan

Preceding station	Taiwan Railway	Following station
Houzhuang towards Kaohsiung	Western Trunk line (Pingtung)	Liukuaicuo towards Fangliao
