= Yun Hai =

Taiwanese-American retailer

- Company type: Private
- Industry: E-commerce, retail
- Founded: 2019; 7 years ago
- Founder: Lisa Cheng Smith
- Headquarters: Brooklyn, New York, U.S.
- Key people: Lillian Lin (co-owner)
- Products: Dried fruit; Artisanal condiments; Appliances
- Website: yunhai.shop

Yun Hai
- Traditional Chinese: 雲海
- Simplified Chinese: 云海
Transcriptions
Standard Mandarin
- Hanyu Pinyin: Yún Hǎi
- Wade–Giles: Yun2 Hai3

Yun Hai (Chinese: 雲海) is an American general store and wholesale e-commerce business based in New York City and Changhua County, Taiwan. Founded by Lisa Cheng Smith in 2019, the company sources cooking ingredients and dried fruit from Taiwan. Yun Hai received media attention after launching a Kickstarter campaign to import Taiwanese dried fruit as a response to China's ban on Taiwanese pineapples in March 2021.

== History ==
Yun Hai was founded by Lisa Cheng Smith, a Taiwanese American who grew up in Texas, in 2019. As an online boutique, Yun Hai offered a handpicked selection of gourmet foods made in Taiwan. The physical pantry shop in Brooklyn opened in June 2022.

The first product that Yun Hai sold was Su Chili Crisp, a hot sauce that Cheng Smith had enjoyed in Taiwan but was unavailable in the United States. Soon after that, Yun Hai started selling soy sauces and hot sauces, usually from second- or third-generation family-owned makers in Taiwan.

In 2021, China banned pineapple imports from Taiwan (90% of which were exported to China at the time of the ban), an action that was characterized by Taiwan as a campaign to ramp up political pressure. As a reaction to the ban, Taiwanese politicians and allies promoted Taiwanese pineapples as freedom pineapples. Following the ban, Cheng Smith and co-owner Lillian Lin launched a Kickstarter campaign to import dried fruit from independent farmers in Taiwan. Expecting to raise around $12,000, the pair raised $113,050. Cheng Smith and Lin worked with Taiwanese farmers and farmer-owned cooperatives to dry and package pineapples. They subsequently added green mango, Irwin mango, pearl guava, and wax apple to their dry-fruit offerings shortly after.

In 2022, Yun Hai became an exclusive distribution agent in the U.S. for Tatung Company's classic rice cooker. In order to promote the product to second-generation Taiwanese Americans, the company also published the Yun Hai Tatung Family Cookbook, featuring traditional Taiwanese recipes in English.

On 30 March 2023, Taiwanese President Tsai Ing-wen visited Yun Hai during her stopover in New York.

== Operations ==
Yun Hai has two warehouses in the U.S., one in California and one in New York, and delivers products to consumers across the contiguous United States. While it has a physical storefront located in Brooklyn, Yun Hai generates most of its sales online. As of 2023, Yun Hai sells over 70 products through its website and over 100 in the shop.

== See also ==
- Wolf warrior diplomacy
- Freedom pineapples
- Taiwanese people in New York City
