= Laonong River =

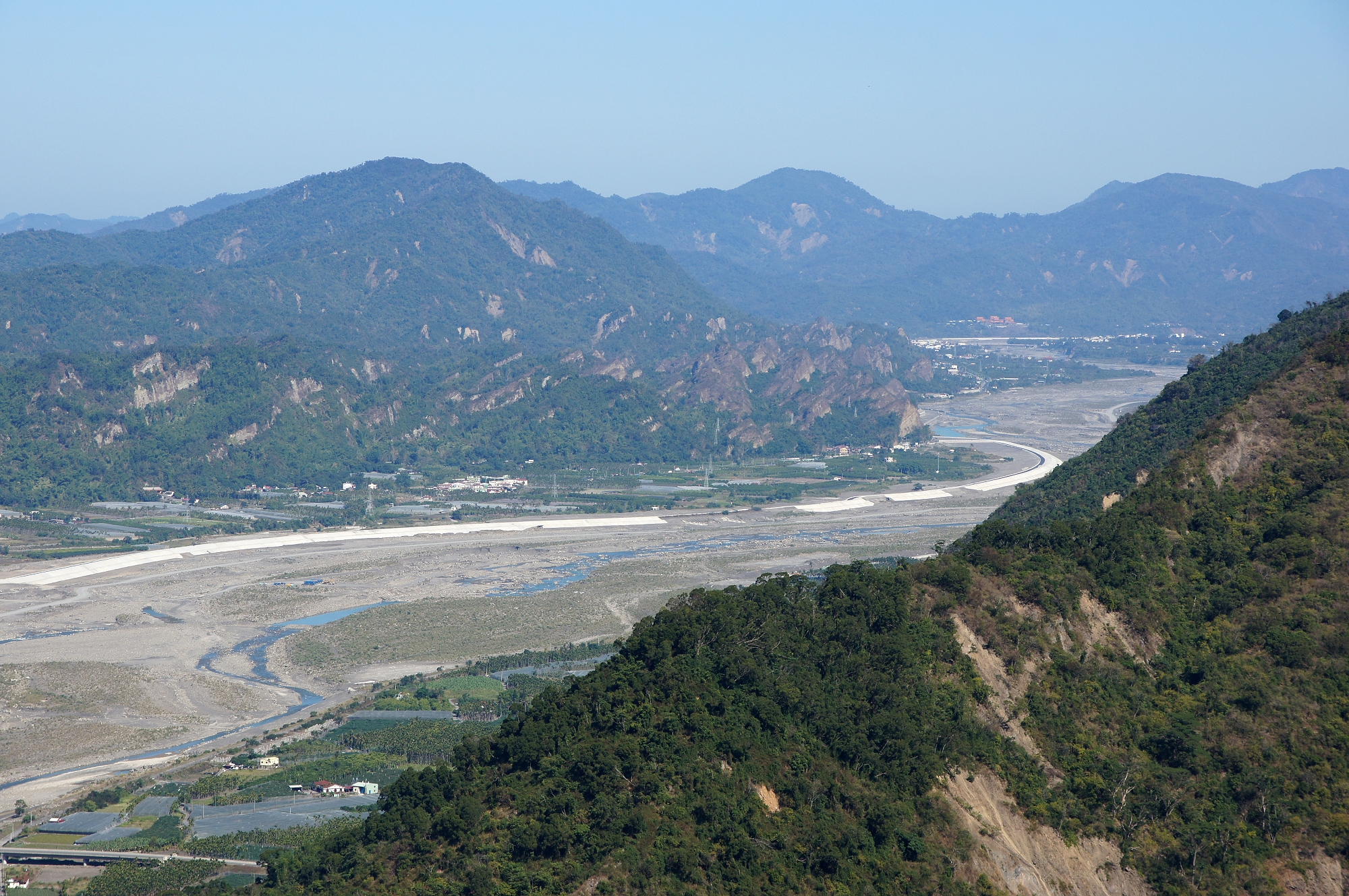

- Map showing the mouth of Laonong River at its confluence with the Ailiao River

Location
- Country: Taiwan

Physical characteristics
- Source
  - location: Central Mountain Range: Yushan
  - coordinates: 23.4700°N 120.95717°E
  - elevation: 3,952 m (12,966 ft)
- Mouth
  - location: Liouguei
  - coordinates: 22.7969°N 120.5117°E
- Length: 136 km (85 mi)
- Basin size: 1,372 km^{2} (530 sq mi)
- Discharge
  - location: Liouguei Bridge
  - average: 52 m^{3}/s (1,800 cu ft/s)
  - minimum: 0.01 m^{3}/s (0.35 cu ft/s)
  - maximum: 5,130 m^{3}/s (181,000 cu ft/s)

Basin features
- River system: Gaoping River

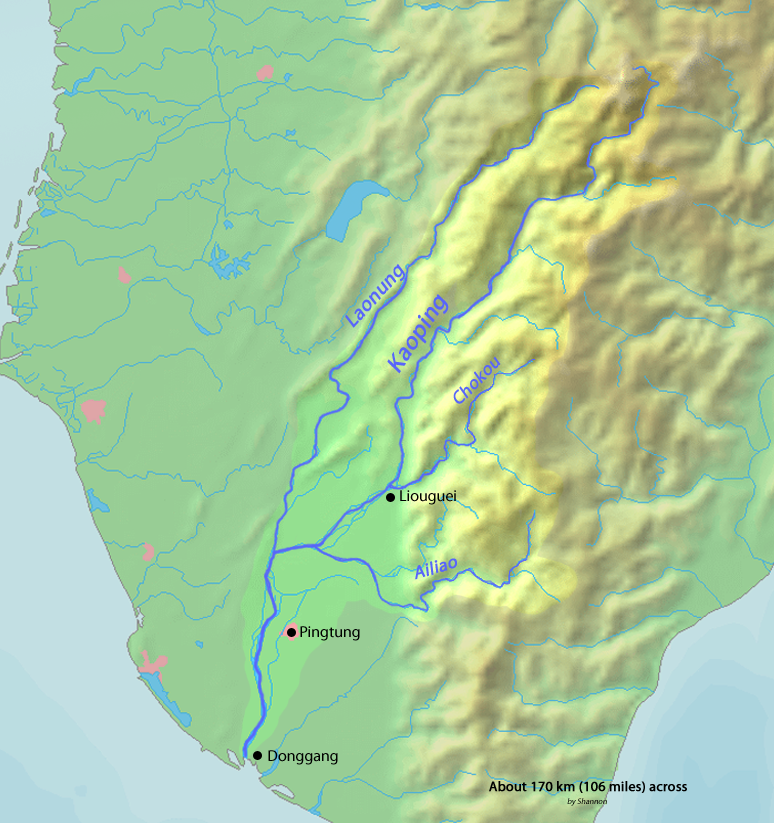
Map of the Gaoping River watershed showing Laonong

The Laonong River, also spelled Laonung River (Chinese: 荖濃溪; pinyin: Lǎo nóng xī; Wade–Giles: Lao^{3}-nung^{2} Hsi^{1}), is a tributary of the Gaoping River in Taiwan; it is the main course of the river system above the Gaoping River. It flows through Kaohsiung City for 136 km.

== See also ==
- List of rivers in Taiwan
