= Sanhe Tile Kiln =

Former factory in Dashu, Kaohsiung, Taiwan

Sanhe Tile Kiln 三和瓦窯
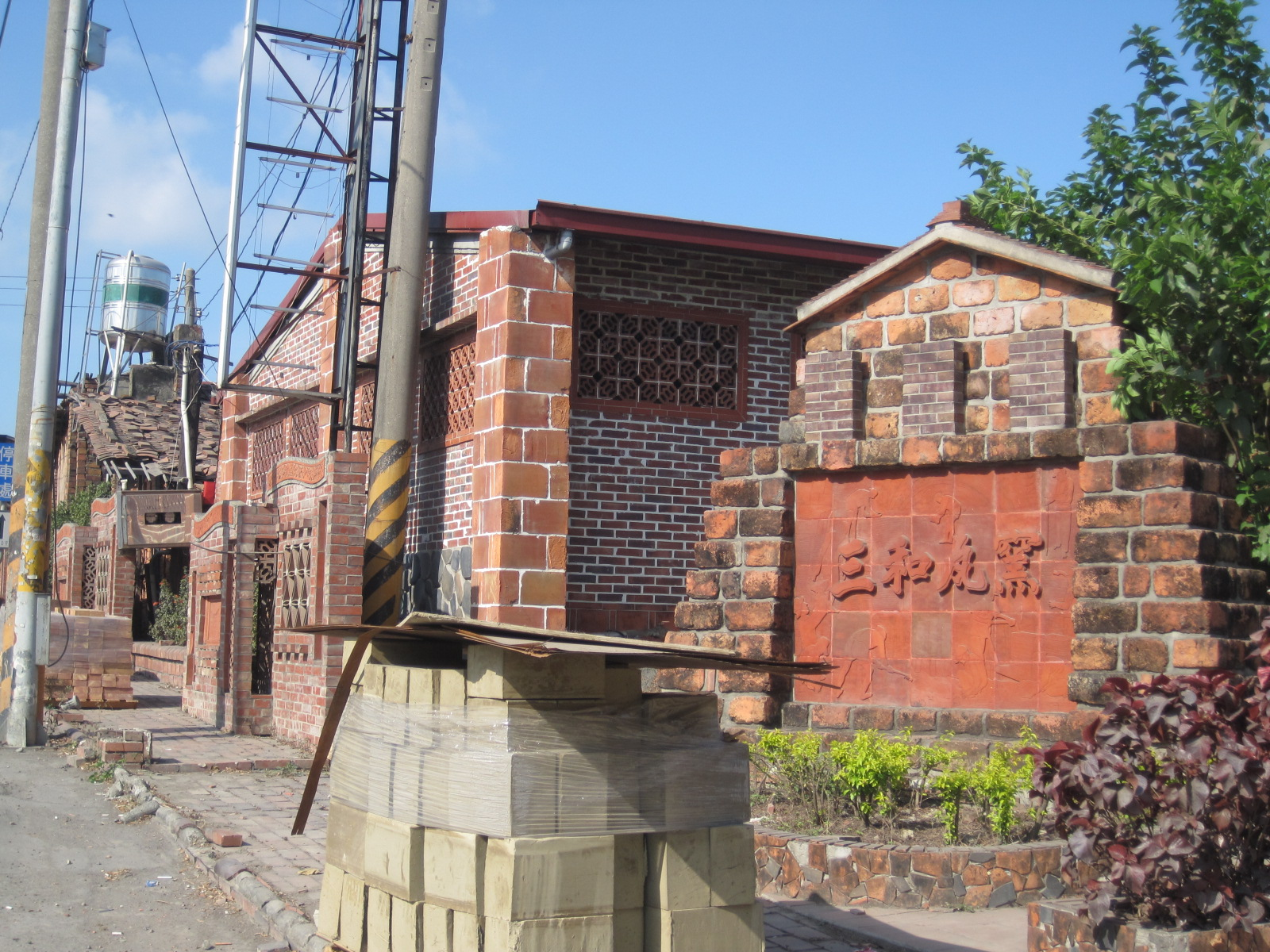
- Built: 1918
- Location: Dashu, Kaohsiung, Taiwan
- Coordinates: 22°40′N 120°26′E
- Products: brick
- Buildings: former kiln

The Sanhe Tile Kiln (traditional Chinese: 三和瓦窯; simplified Chinese: 三和瓦窑; pinyin: Zhōngdōu Tángróng Zhuānyáochǎng) is a former tile manufacturing factory in Dashu District, Kaohsiung, Taiwan.

== History ==
The original building of the factory was established in 1918. The building used to be the Shunanhao Tile Kiln. It has since undergone name changes twice, first to Yuan Shun-an Tile Kiln. In 1975, it was renamed Sanhe Tile Kiln. In 2001, parts of the building were registered as a historical site by the government.

== Community Craft ==
=== Rise and Decline ===
Dashu is located along the Gaoping River, with convenient access to water and fine clay without impurities, making it suitable for brick and tile firing. It was not until the late Qing Dynasty that kiln factories started to establish after obtaining the brick-making techniques from mainland China. During the Japanese colonial period, the tile kiln industry in the Dashu area flourished, with about twenty-three factories and more than one hundred and thirty kilns at its peak, making Dashu the main production and distribution center for tiles in Taiwan.

The Sanhe Tile Kiln in Dashu was founded in 1918 (7th year of the Taisho era) by Mr. Hsu An-Jan. At that time, it was named "Shun An Hao Brick Factory." In the late Japanese colonial period, it expanded, acquired other kiln factories, and changed its name to "Yuan Shun An Brick Factory." After the war, it was again renamed "Yuan Shun An Tile Factory" and later changed to "Sanhe Tile Factory." In the 1960s, due to the decreasing demand for brick and tile for buildings, the tile kiln industry in the Dashu area thus declined. After the closure of the Chin Yuan Hsing Tile Factory in 1988, Sanhe Tile Kiln became the last remaining kiln in Dashu.

=== Cultural Transformation ===
Li Chun-Hong, the fourth-generation owner of Sanhe Tile Kiln, organized the Tile Kiln Culture Association. In 1994, the Association participated in community activities and workshops for community development, reviving Dashu residents’ memories of and enthusiasm for brick and tile kilns. In 2004, Sanhe Tile Kiln in Dashu was registered as a historical building by the Kaohsiung City Government. In 2006, the Association participated in the Community Craft Development Program of the National Taiwan Craft Research and Development Institute to develop a micro craft network in the community and to foster community economic opportunities. They further developed creative products based on brick and tiles, leading the community craft towards an industrial culture. In 2011, Sanhe established a cultural and creative design company and created the brand "Sanhe Tile Kiln." The products currently produced by Sanhe Tile Kiln are mostly used in the restoration of old buildings. Additionally, through the Small and Medium Enterprise Innovation and Research Program under the Ministry of Economic Affairs, Sanhe also integrates innovative thinking to create environmentally friendly bricks using discarded bricks and rice husk ash.

== Architecture ==
The building is made of straw-mixed bricks, red bricks and roof tiles fired in the kiln.

== Exhibition ==
The former factory gives explanation on brick history, traditional brick production, ancient kiln style, brick community and creative development of bricks and tiles.

== Transportation ==
The former factory is accessible within walking distance north of Jiuqutang Station of Taiwan Railway.

== See also ==
- List of tourist attractions in Taiwan
