= Wuluo River =

River in Pingtung County, Taiwan

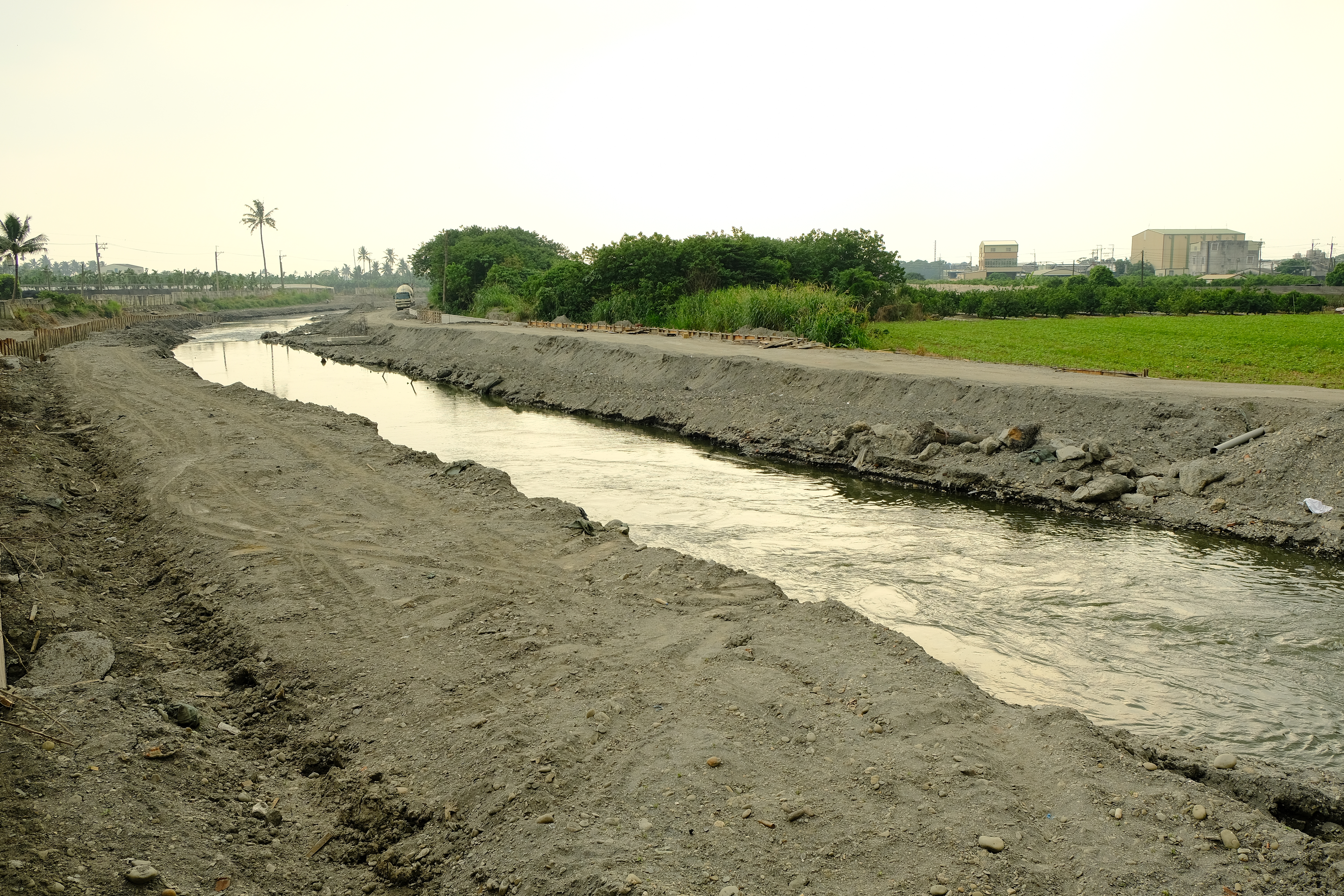

- The confluence of the Wuluo and Gaoping Rivers

Location
- Country: Taiwan

Physical characteristics
- Mouth
  - location: Dashu
  - coordinates: 22.658°N 120.437°E

Basin features
- River system: Gaoping River

The Wuluo River, also spelled Wulo River, (Chinese: 武洛溪; pinyin: Wǔluò Xī; Wade–Giles: Wu^{3}-lo^{4} Hsi^{1}) is a tributary of the Gaoping River in Pingtung County, Taiwan.

The river has long been polluted by untreated domestic and partially treated pig farming wastewater. It is among the most polluted rivers in Taiwan and the most polluted tributary of the Gaoping River. As one mitigation measure, a constructed wetland was established in 2004.

== See also ==
- List of rivers in Taiwan
