= Olav Bjørgaas =

Norwegian physician (1926–2019)

Olav Bjørgaas (Chinese: 畢嘉士; 7 September 1926 – 15 November 2019) was a Norwegian physician in Taiwan.

== Life and career ==
Olav Bjørgaas was born on 7 September 1926 in Stavanger, Norway. Bjørgaas's family was poor, and his father was chronically ill. His childhood circumstances inspired him to become a doctor. Bjørgaas planned to work in China as a medical missionary with the Norwegian Mission Alliance (NMA), but was unable to do so, as he had not finished his medical studies by 1949, when the Chinese Communist Party expelled NMA members from the country. Bjørgaas earned his medical qualifications in January 1954, married his wife Kari in February, and joined the NMA in Taiwan by July. Upon Bjørgaas's arrival in Taiwan, he met fellow physician Kristoffer Fotland, who had left Mackay Memorial Hospital.

Bjørgaas chose to work with patients with leprosy while in Taiwan, and Joseph Leyburn Wilkerson, a colleague of Lillian Dickson's, contacted him in August 1954 with a job offer at the Losheng Sanatorium. Bjørgaas found that many patients distrusted him until Bjørgaas used a catheter to remove phlegm from a choking patient. Within two years at Losheng, Bjørgaas learned that multiple patients were from southern Taiwan, so he moved to Pingtung County. He became the leader of a clinic located in a granary established for the treatment of tuberculosis. Bjørgaas subsequently founded a clinic near Kaohsiung for people with leprosy. Bjørgaas worked with former Losheng residents to search for lepers throughout Pingtung. While treating the sick, he did not use the word "leprosy" or record patient names. As the number of patients increased, Bjørgaas moved his Pingtung operations to a mansion built in the Japanese era, and renamed it the Pingtung Christian Clinic. Fotland joined Bjørgaas and traveled with him to Wutai, Kucapungane, and Mudan to treat patients for no charge. By 1958, the Pingtung Christian Clinic had been expanded with a sanatorium for children with tuberculosis. It also began treating polio. When the area was hit with a measles outbreak, Bjørgaas went to Kaohsiung and asked American military officers to deliver food and medicine to the sick via helicopter. Bjørgaas also sent staff of the Pingtung Christian Clinic to Liouguei, Kaohsiung, where they worked alongside the Baptist preacher and educator Yang Hsu and his wife Lin Feng-ying, who cofounded the Liouguei Mountain Children's Home.

Bjørgaas returned to Norway in 1959 to raise money for the Pingtung Christian Clinic. When a polio epidemic struck southern Taiwan in the 1960s, Bjørgaas arranged for American-made vaccines to be imported and administered 4,000 vaccinations for free. In 1963, the Pingtung Christian Hospital opened. Bjørgaas was reassigned to a leprosy clinic in Kaohsiung in 1967, and left Taiwan briefly, before returning to Pingtung in 1974. He established a medical ward for the care of people with cerebral palsy in 1978, as well as Victory Home for people with disabilities. Bjørgaas later worked for the NMA in Vietnam, South America and Haiti. He retired and returned to Norway in 1982, though Bjørgaas did work for the Sino-German Clinic in China in 1991.

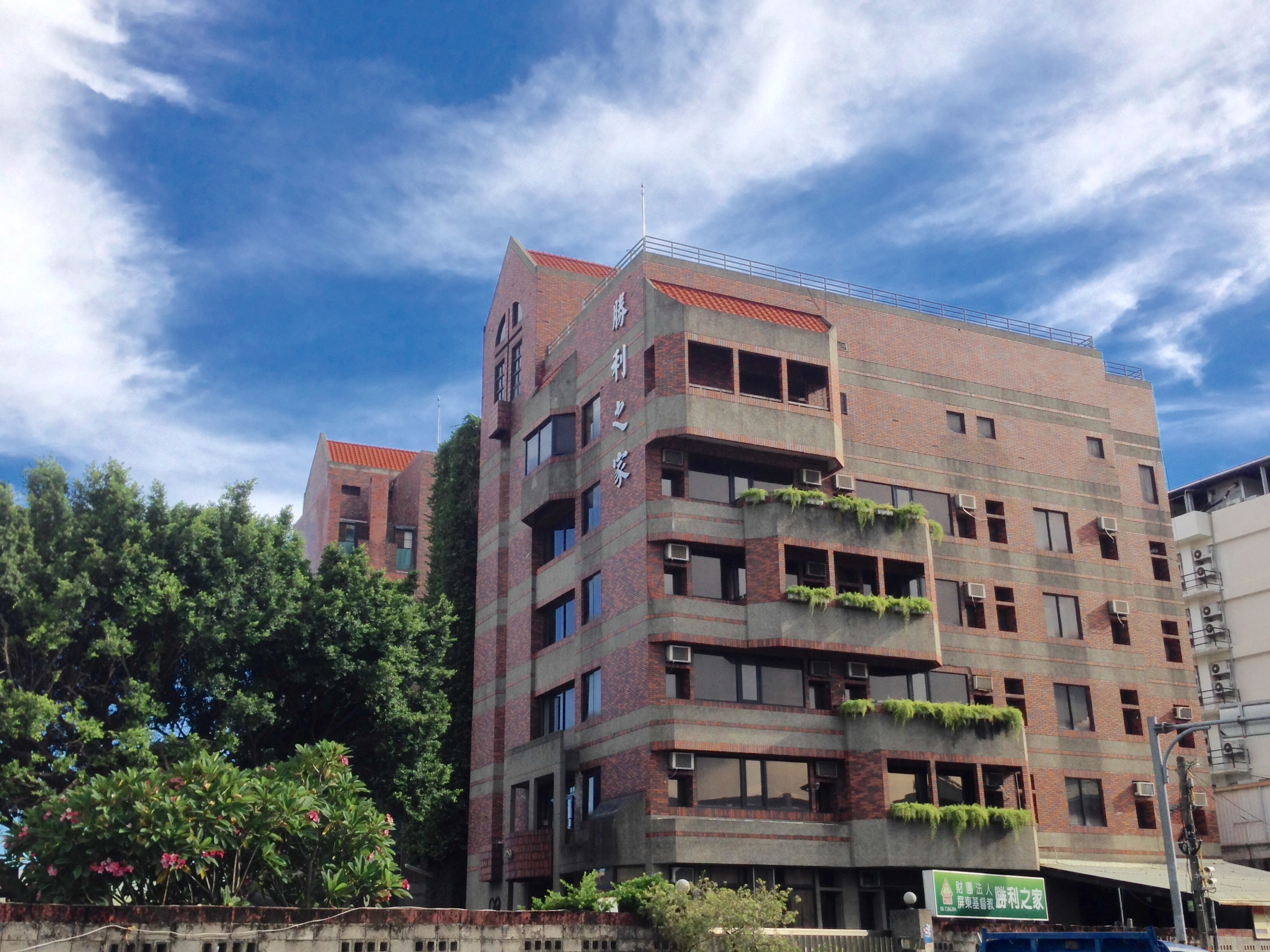
The Victory Home in Pingtung established by Bjørgaas, pictured in 2016

== Legacy ==
In December 2008, Bjørgaas was awarded the St. Olav's Medal. The Bjørgaas Social Welfare Foundation, named for Olav Bjørgaas, was established in 2013, and began working with widows from Malawi. The foundation has also arranged educational exchanges amongst students from Malawi and Taiwan, and worked with the elderly in Taiwan. Bjørn Jarle Sørheim-Queseth wrote a biography of Bjørgaas in 2012, a Chinese translation of which was published in 2013 in Taiwan by CommonWealth Publishing. Bjørgaas himself was awarded the Fervent Global Love of Lives Medal by the Chou Ta-Kuan Cultural and Educational Foundation in 2014. Bjørgaas died on 15 November 2019, in Stavanger, Norway.
