= Guchuan Bridge =

Suspension bridge in Pingtung County, Taiwan

Guchuan Bridge 谷川大橋
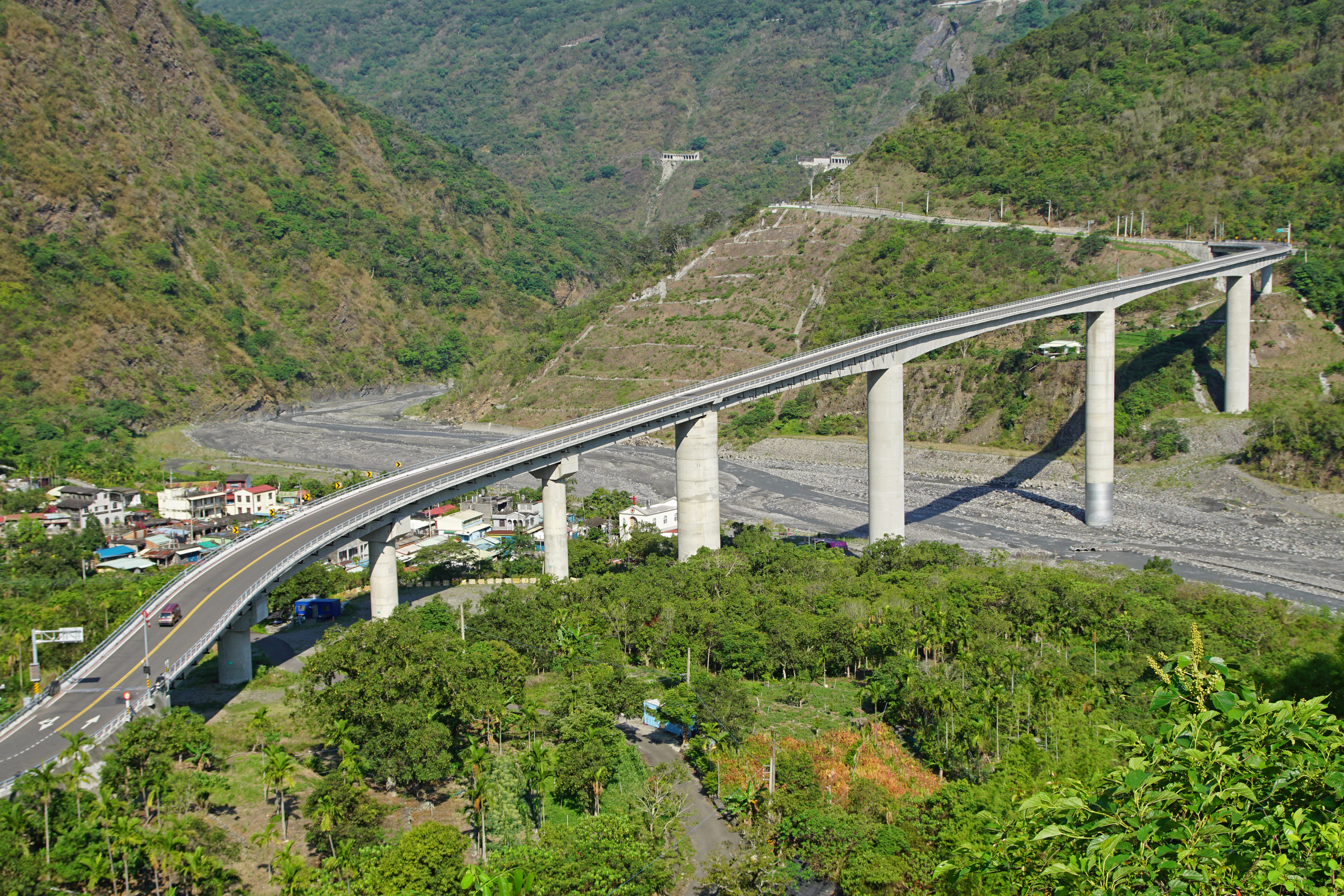
- Coordinates: 22°44′52.0″N 120°42′16.9″E
- Locale: Sandimen and Wutai in Pingtung County, Taiwan
- Preceded by: Wutai No. 1 Bridge

Characteristics
- Design: bridge
- Material: Concrete
- Trough construction: Steel
- Total length: 654 meters
- Width: 10 meters
- Piers in water: 1

History
- Construction start: 2009
- Construction end: 2013
- Construction cost: NT$700 million
- Opened: 5 October 2013

The Guchuan Bridge (traditional Chinese: 谷川大橋; simplified Chinese: 谷川大桥; pinyin: Gǔchuān Dàqiáo) is a bridge connecting Sandimen Township and Wutai Township in Pingtung County, Taiwan. At the height of 99 meters, it is the tallest bridge pier in Taiwan.

== History ==
The bridge was opened for traffic on 5 October 2013 after four years of construction with a total cost of NT$700 million. The bridge was built to replace the original bridge named Wutai No. 1 Bridge which was destroyed by Typhoon Morakot in August 2009.

== Technical specification ==
The bridge has a length of 654 meters and width of 10 meters, and is made of concrete and steel. It crosses over the North Ailiao River. To avoid damage by flash flood along the river during typhoon season, there is only one pier built in the path of continuous river flow.

== Economy ==
The bridge plays a significant role in the economic activity of Wutai Township which is located in an isolated mountain region in southern Taiwan. Tourists have been coming to the township through the bridge which led to the opening of several new hotels.

== See also ==
- List of bridges in Taiwan
