= Bjørgaas =

Bjørgaas is a Norwegian surname. Notable people with the surname include:

- Olav Bjørgaas (1926–2019), Norwegian physician
- Tove Bjørgaas (born 1972), Norwegian television correspondent
