= Kao-Ping Hsi Bridge =

Kao-Ping Hsi Bridge 高屏溪斜張橋
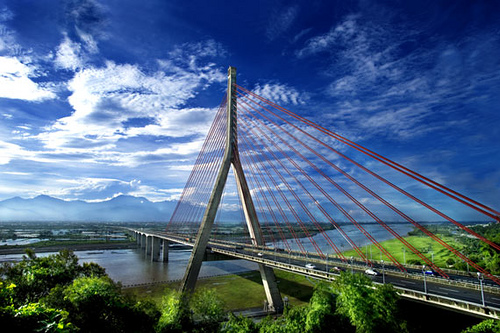
- Kao-Ping Hsi Bridge
- Coordinates: 22.76585°N 120.44996°E
- Carries: Freeway 3
- Crosses: Gaoping River
- Locale: Kaohsiung and Pingtung County in Taiwan
- Official name: Kao-Ping Hsi Bridge
- Maintained by: Taiwan Area National Freeway Bureau

Characteristics
- Design: Cable-stayed bridge
- Material: Steel, prestressed concrete
- Total length: 2,617 metres (8,586 ft)
- Width: 34.4 metres (113 ft)
- Height: 183.5 metres (602 ft)
- Longest span: 330 metres (1,083 ft)
- Clearance below: 50 metres (160 ft)

History
- Designer: China engineering consultants incorporation
- Fabrication by: China Steel
- Construction start: Apr 29, 1996
- Construction end: Dec 30, 1999
- Construction cost: NTD2.136 billions
- Opened: Dec 30, 1999

Statistics
- Toll: Electronic Toll Collection

Location
- Interactive map of Kao-Ping Hsi Bridge 高屏溪斜張橋

Kao-Ping Hsi Bridge (traditional Chinese: 高屏溪斜張橋; simplified Chinese: 高屏溪斜张桥; pinyin: Gāopíng Xī Xiézhāng Qiáo) is a cable-stayed bridge over the Gaoping River connecting Dashu, Kaohsiung and Jiuru, Pingtung County in Taiwan. The bridge carries the Freeway 3 and was completed in 1999. The bridge is an important transport corridor between Kaohsiung and Pingtung and a famous landmark in Pingtung.

== See also ==
- List of bridges in Taiwan
- List of tallest bridges
