= Taiwan Pineapple Museum =

Museum in Dashu, Kaohsiung, Taiwan

- 臺灣鳳梨工場
- Established: August 2018
- Location: Dashu, Kaohsiung, Taiwan
- Coordinates: 22°39′27.8″N 120°25′14.9″E
- Type: museum
- Owner: Jioucyutang Taifang Company

The Taiwan Pineapple Museum (traditional Chinese: 臺灣鳳梨工場; simplified Chinese: 台湾凤梨工场; pinyin: Táiwān Fènglí Gōngchǎng) is a museum of pineapple in Dashu District, Kaohsiung, Taiwan.

== History ==
The museum is housed in a refurbished factory, constructed in 1925, called Jioucyutang Taifang Company. It is a factory that canned pineapples produced by farms around the region. In 2004, the factory building was listed as a historical monument by the Kaohsiung County Government. The building was then renovated and reopened as Taiwan Pineapple Museum in August 2018.

== Exhibitions ==
The museum exhibits the history of the Jioucyutang Taifang Company and Dashu District. It also displays an overview of the agriculture activities in the region, especially of the pineapple industry. It has a collection of more than 50 canned pineapple labels produced by the company.

== Transportation ==
The museum is accessible within walking distance north of Jiuqutang Station of Taiwan Railway.

== See also ==
- List of museums in Taiwan
- Pineapple production in Taiwan
