= Dashu District =

District in Kaohsiung, Taiwan

Coordinates: 22.693394°N 120.433095°E

Dashu 大樹區
- District
- Dashu District
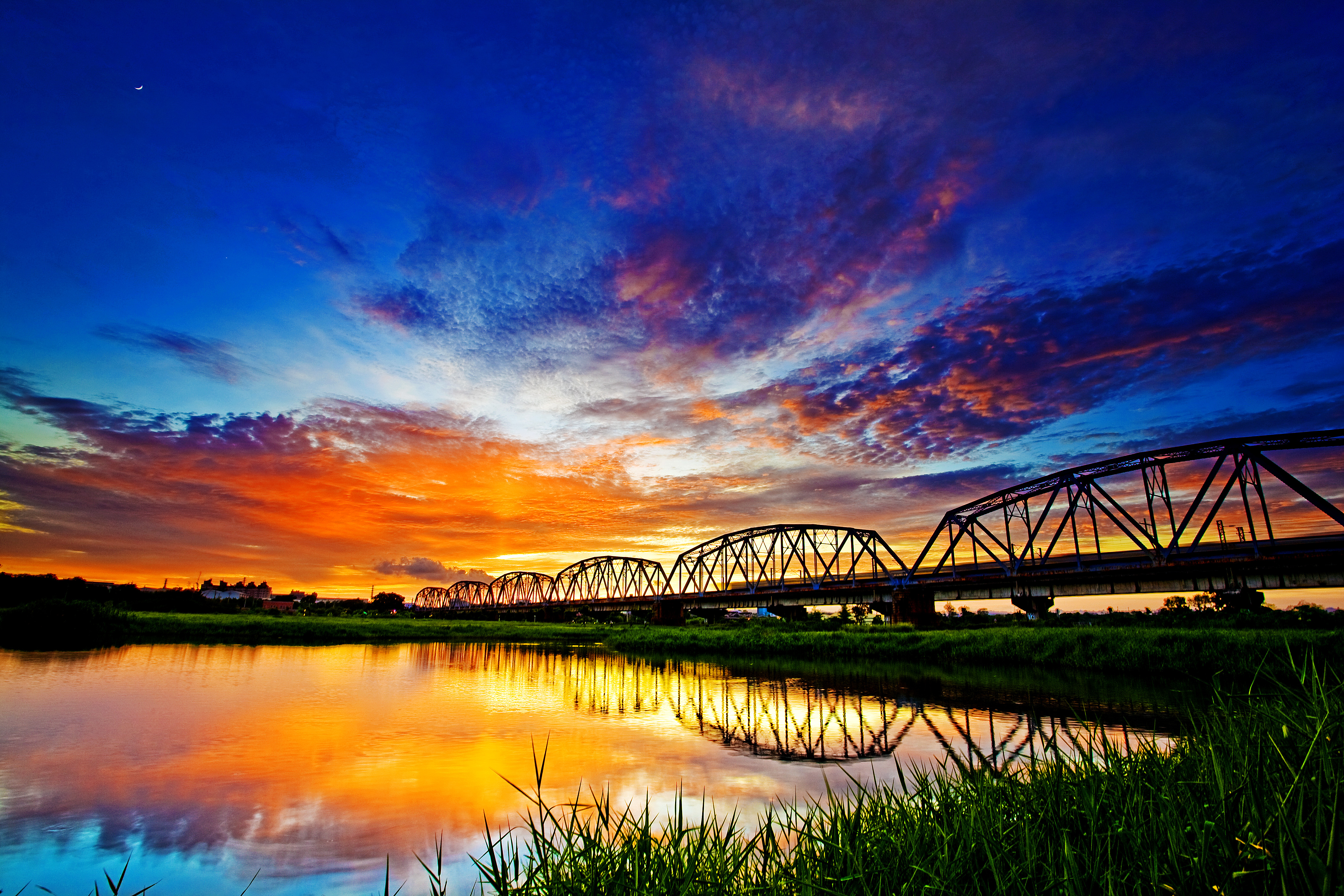
- Dashu District

- Emblem of Dashu District

- Dashu District in Kaohsiung City
- Country: Taiwan
- Region: Southern Taiwan

Population (October 2023)
  - Total: 40,484
- Website: dashu.kcg.gov.tw/en/

Dashu District (Chinese: 大樹區; pinyin: Dàshù Qū; Wade–Giles: Ta^{4}-shu^{4} Ch'ü^{1}; Pe̍h-ōe-jī: Toā-chhiū-khu) is a suburban district located in Kaohsiung City, Taiwan near the Kaoping River. Fo Guang Shan is one of largest tourist attractions in Dashu District. It is also the base of E-Da World, a new lifestyle destination that encompasses the upscale Crowne Plaza Kaohsiung E-Da World hotel, the E-Da Skylark hotel, the E-DA Theme Park, the E-Da Mall, E-Da City (Real Estate Development) and I-Shou University.

== History ==
After the handover of Taiwan from Japan to the Republic of China in 1945, Dashu was organized as a rural township of Kaohsiung County. On 25 December 2010, Kaohsiung County was merged with Kaohsiung City and Dashu was upgraded to a district of the city.

== Geography ==
- Area: 66.9811 km^{2}
- Population: 40,484 people (October 2023)

== Administrative divisions ==
The district consists of Zhuliao, Jiuqu, Jiutang, Shuian, Shuiliao, Shejiao, Xingshan, Heshan, Gushan, Dakeng, Jingjiao, Xiaoping, Longmu, Dashu, Sanhe, Xipu, Xingtian and Tongling Village.

== Education ==
=== Higher education ===
- I-Shou University

=== Senior high schools ===
- Pu-Men High School
- Kaohsiung Yida Private International Senior High School (高雄市私立義大國際高級中學)

=== Junior high schools ===
- Kaohsiung Dashu Junior High School (高雄市立大樹國民中學)
- Kaohsiung Xipu Junior High School (高雄市立溪埔國民中學)
- Kaohsiung Yida Private International Junior High School (高雄市私立義大國際高級中學附設國民中學)

=== Primary schools ===
- Kaohsiung Dashu District Dashu Primary School (高雄市大樹區大樹國民小學)
- Kaohsiung Dashu District Jiuqu Primary School (高雄市大樹區九曲國民小學)
- Kaohsiung Dashu District Shui Laotian Primary School (高雄市大樹區水寮國民小學)
- Kaohsiung Dashu District Xipu Primary School (高雄市大樹區溪埔國民小學)
- Kaohsiung Dashu District Longmu Primary School (高雄市大樹區龍目國民小學)
- Kaohsiung Dashu District Xiaoping Primary School (高雄市大樹區小坪國民小學)
- Kaohsiung Dashu District Gushan Primary School (高雄市大樹區姑山國民小學)
- Kaohsiung Yida Private International Primary School (高雄市私立義大國際高級中學附設國民小學)
- Kaohsiung Dashu District Xingtian Primary School (高雄市大樹區興田國民小學)

=== International schools ===
- I-Shou International School

== Tourist attractions ==
- Buddha Memorial Center
- Fo Guang Shan Buddha Museum
- E-DA Theme Park
- Ligang Bridge
- Sanhe Tile Kiln
- Taiwan Pineapple Museum

== Transportation ==
- TR Jiuqutang Station
- Nat 3
  - Kao-Ping Hsi Bridge

== See also ==
- Kaohsiung
