= Jiuru =

Rural township in Pingtung County, Taiwan

Coordinates: 22°44′0″N 120°29′0″E

Jiuru Township 九如鄉
- Rural township
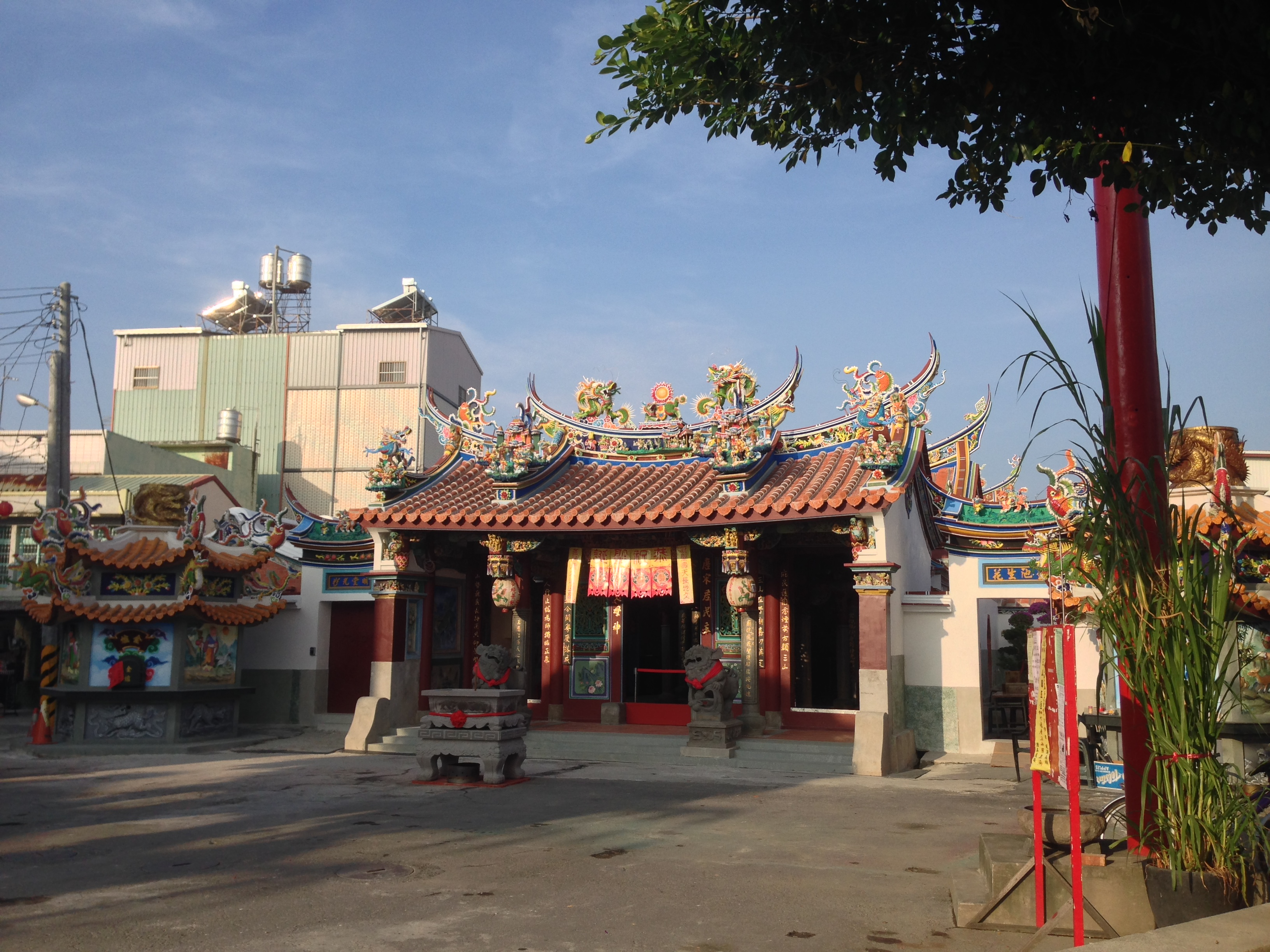

- Jiuru Township in Pingtung County
- Interactive map of Jiuru Township 九如鄉
- Location: Pingtung County, Taiwan

Area
  - Total: 42 km^{2} (16 sq mi)

Population (February 2024)
  - Total: 21,631
  - Density: 520/km^{2} (1,300/sq mi)

Jiuru Township (Chinese: 九如鄉; Hanyu Pinyin: Jiǔrú Xiāng; Tongyong Pinyin: Jiǒurú Xiāng; Wade–Giles: Chiu^{3}-ju^{2} Hsiang^{1}) is a rural township in Pingtung County, Taiwan.

== Geography ==
It has a total population of 21,631 and an area of 42.02 square kilometres (16.22 sq mi).

== Administrative divisions ==
The township comprises 11 villages: Daqiu, Houzhuang, Jiukuai, Jiuming, Jiuqing, Qiaxing, Qilao, Sankuai, Tungning, Yuquan and Yushui.

== Transportation ==
- Nat 3
  - Kao-Ping Hsi Bridge

== Tourist attractions ==
- Ligang Bridge
- Three Mountains King Temple
