= Houzhuang railway station =

Railway station in Daliao, Kaohsiung, Taiwan

Houzhuang Station 後庄車站
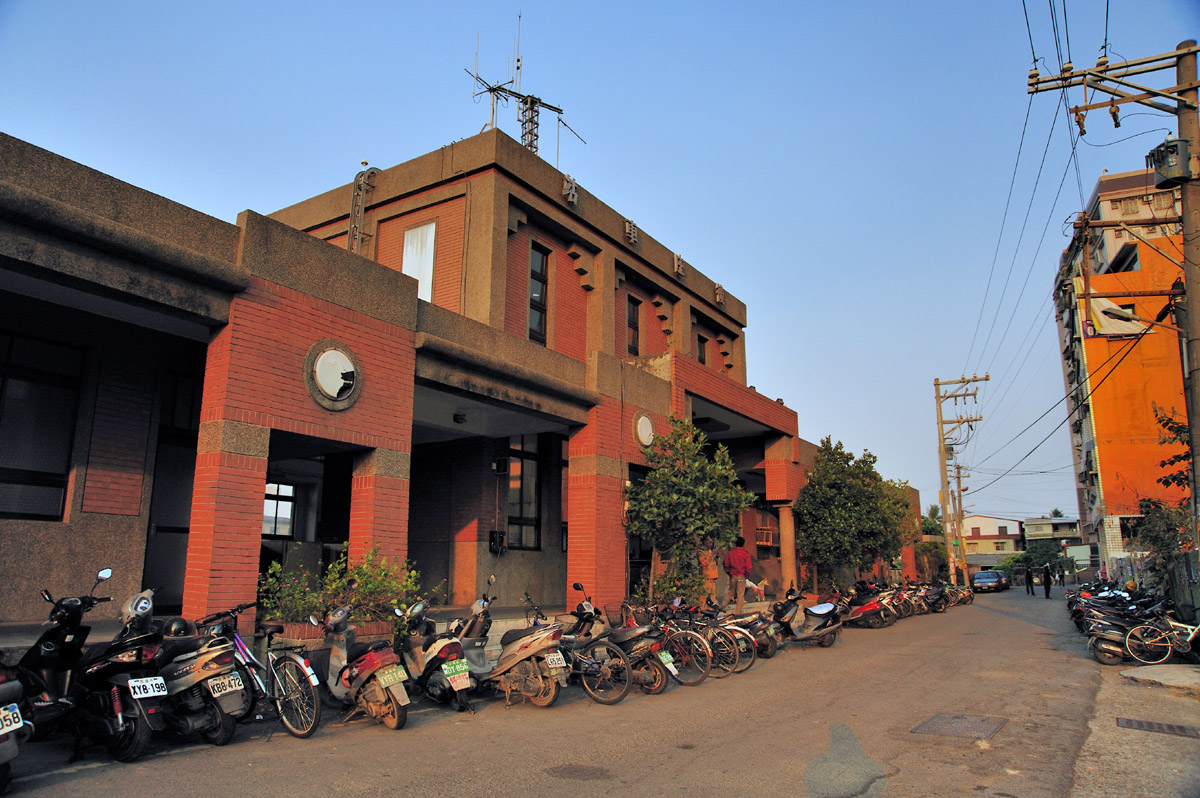

General information
- Location: Daliao, Kaohsiung, Taiwan
- Coordinates: 22.640194°N 120.391293°E
- System: Train station
- Owner: Taiwan Railway Corporation
- Operator: Taiwan Railway Corporation
- Line: Western Trunk line (Pingtung)
- Train operators: Taiwan Railway Corporation

History
- Opened: 25 June 1908; 118 years ago

Passengers
- 1,347 daily (2024)

Services
Preceding station	Taiwan Railway	Following station
Fongshan towards Kaohsiung	Western Trunk line (Pingtung)	Jiuqutang towards Fangliao
Location

Houzhuang Station (Chinese: 後庄車站; pinyin: Hòuzhuāng Chēzhàn; Wade–Giles: Hou⁴chuang¹ Che¹chan⁴; Pe̍h-ōe-jī: Āu-tsng tshia-tsām), formerly spelled as Houjhuang and Houchuang, and spelled as Koshō during Japanese rule, is a railway station on Taiwan Railway Pingtung line located in Daliao District, Kaohsiung, Taiwan.

== History ==
The station was opened on 25 June 1908.

== See also ==
- List of railway stations in Taiwan

Preceding station	Taiwan Railway	Following station
Fengshan towards Kaohsiung	Western Trunk line (Pingtung)	Jiuqutang towards Fangliao
