= Pineapple production in Taiwan =

Part of agriculture in Taiwan

Pineapple plantation in Mingjian, Nantou County

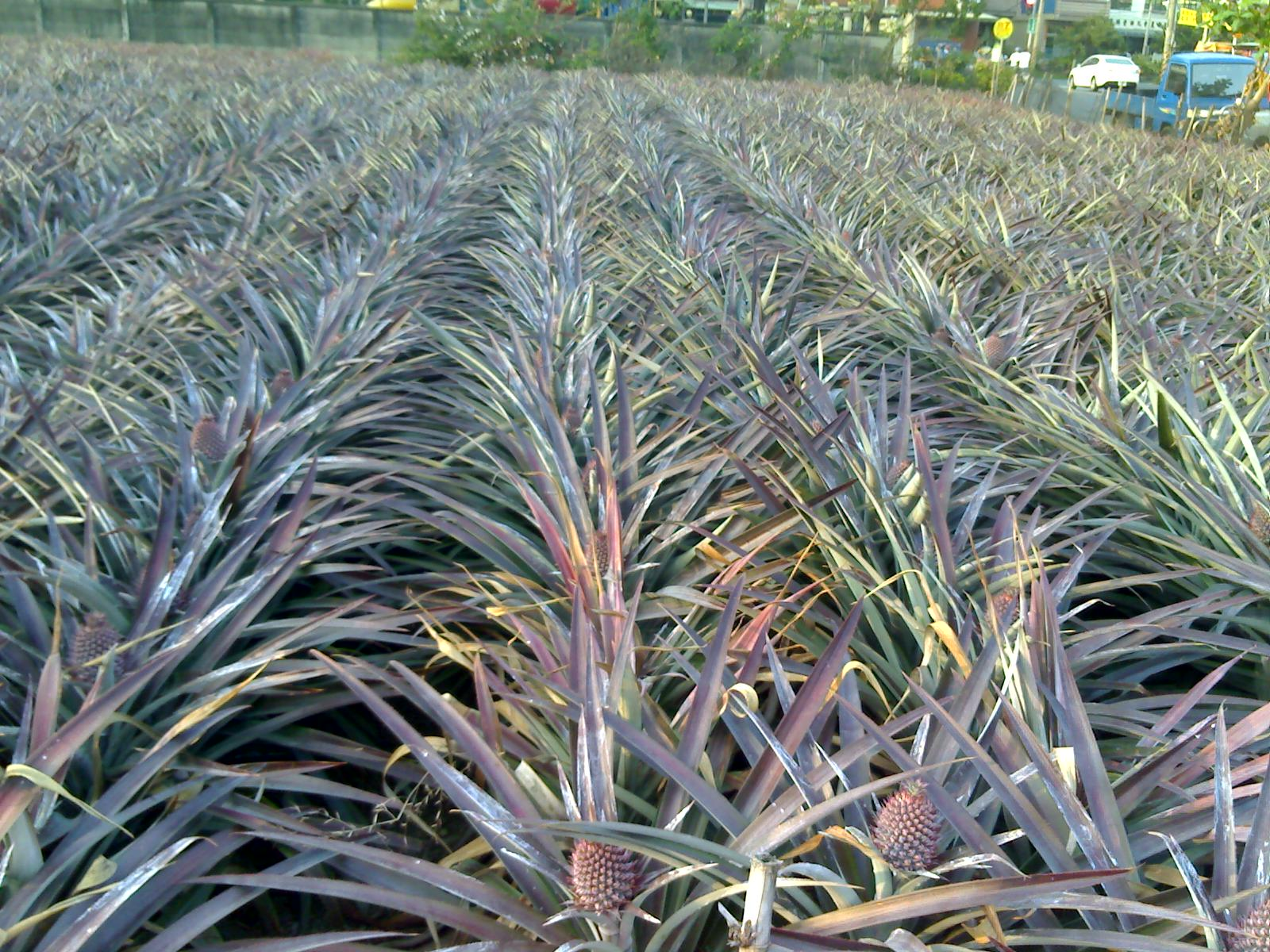
Pineapple plantation at Jiaochitang

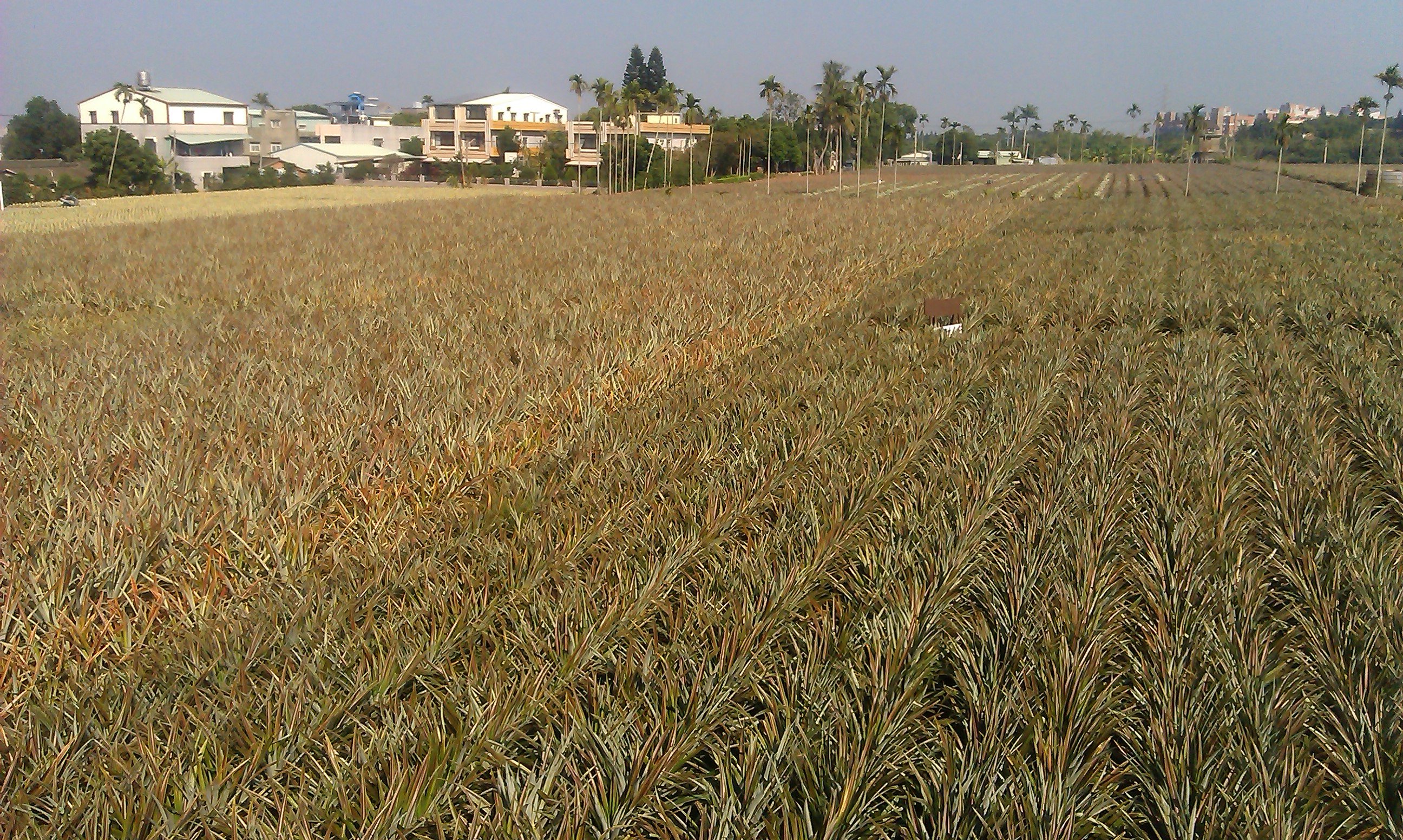
Pineapple plantation

Pineapple is one of the fruit crops produced in Taiwan.

== Geography ==
Pineapple fields in Taiwan are mostly located in the central and southern regions, in which 30% of them are located in Pingtung County, followed by Kaohsiung (14%), Tainan (14%), Chiayi County (13%), Nantou County (12%), and Hualien County and Taitung County.

== Varieties ==
More than 90 varieties of pineapple are grown in Taiwan however 84% of production is of just one variety, the golden diamond pineapple also known as Tainung 17. Other popular varieties are winter honey (Tainung 13), milky (Tainung 20), sugar-apple (Tainung 4), and perfume (Tainung 11). The smooth cayenne was the first variety introduced into Taiwan during the Japanese colonial period and remains in cultivation. The golden diamond pineapple became dominant as its price rose over the years due to its popularity in China. As Taiwanese growers seek to diversify away from the Chinese market they will have to shift production to other varieties.

The variety Tainung No. 23 has no fibers and smells like mangoes in addition to having a long shelf life. Tainung No. 23 gained intellectual property protection in the Japanese market in 2022. In 2023 the Council of Agriculture accused the Chinese government of producing the Tainung No. 23 without permission. In response to the variety being smuggled to China agricultural intellectual property protection laws were strengthened.

== Economy ==
The industry developed under the Japanese colonial regime and by 1939 Taiwan was the third largest exporter of canned pineapple in the world.

Over the past few years, Taiwan produces 420,000 tons on average annually. Around 11% of pineapple production in Taiwan are exported to 16 countries or regions around the world, in which 90% of them to mainland China. In 2020, the total export to mainland China was 41,661 tons, valued approximately around NT$1.5 billion. It is followed by Japan (2,160 tons), Hong Kong (1,186 tons) and Singapore (421 tons). In 2021, a ban on Taiwanese pineapples in mainland China sparked the "freedom pineapples" phenomenon.

== Tourism ==
- Taiwan Pineapple Museum

== See also ==
- Agriculture in Taiwan
- Pineapple cake
