= Freedom pineapples =

Political response to Chinese import ban

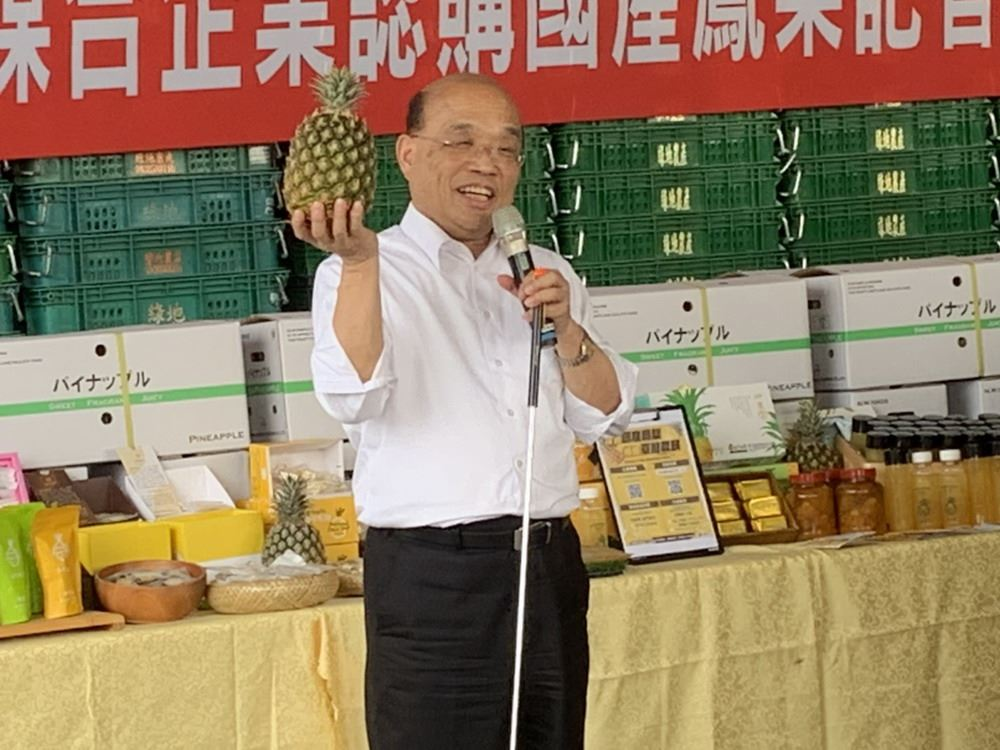
- Traditional Chinese: 自由鳳梨
- Simplified Chinese: 自由凤梨
Transcriptions
Standard Mandarin
- Hanyu Pinyin: Zìyóu fènglí
- Bopomofo: ㄗˋㄧㄡˊ ㄈㄥˋㄌㄧˊ
- Wade–Giles: Tzu^{4}-yu^{2} feng^{4}-li^{2}
- Tongyong Pinyin: Zìh-yóu fòng-lí
- IPA: [tsî.iǒʊ fə̂ŋ.lǐ]
Yue: Cantonese
- Yale Romanization: Jih-yàuh fuhng-lèih
- Jyutping: zi6 jau4 fung6 lei4
- IPA: [tsi˨ jɐw˩ fʊŋ˨ lej˩]

Alternative Chinese name
- Traditional Chinese: 自由菠蘿
- Simplified Chinese: 自由菠萝
Transcriptions
Standard Mandarin
- Hanyu Pinyin: Zìyóu bōluó
- Bopomofo: ㄗˋㄧㄡˊ ㄅㄛㄌㄨㄛˊ
- Wade–Giles: Tzu^{4}-yu^{2} Po^{1}-lo^{2}
- Tongyong Pinyin: Zìh-yóu bo-luó
- IPA: [tsî.iǒʊ pwó.lwǒ]
Yue: Cantonese
- Yale Romanization: Jih-yàuh Bō-lòh
- Jyutping: zi6 jau4 bo1 lo4
- IPA: [tsi˨ jɐw˩ pɔ˥ lɔ˩]

Freedom pineapples (Chinese: 自由鳳梨; pinyin: Zìyóu fènglí) was a political and social response to the 2021 Chinese ban on the importation of pineapples into China from Taiwan. It encouraged domestic and international consumption to replace the loss of the mainland Chinese market, which had formerly imported 97% of all Taiwanese pineapple exports. However, the campaign did not fully shield Taiwan from the economic consequences of the import ban. In 2021, Taiwanese pineapple exports dropped to 55% of their 2019 levels.

== Background ==
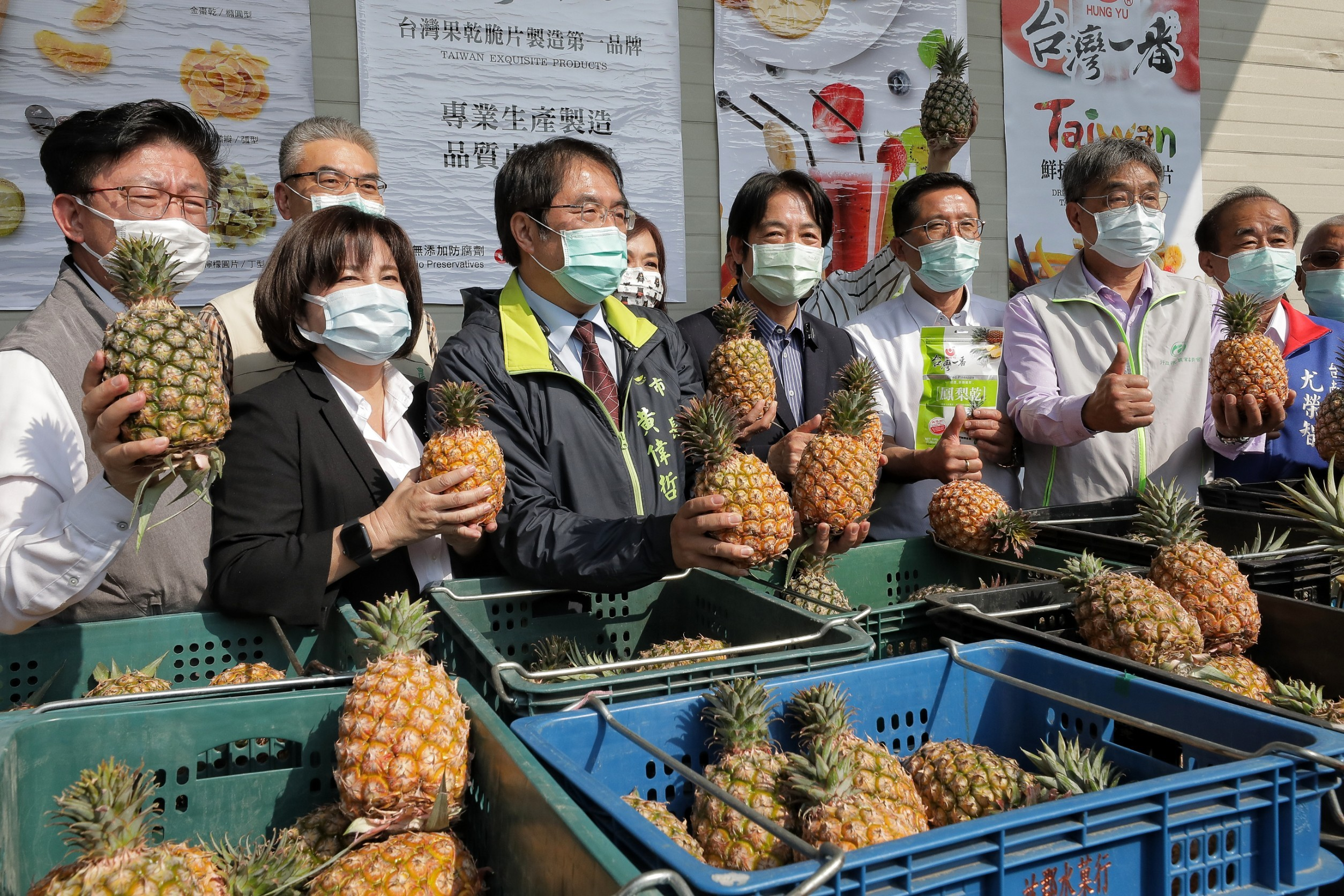
Lai Ching-te and Huang Wei-cher showing support for pineapple farmers in Tainan on 28 February 2021.

In March 2021, following months of threats, the Chinese government banned the import of pineapples from Taiwan, citing biosecurity concerns. PRC customs agents stated that they had found harmful pests in then-recent fruit shipments. At the time, over 90% of Taiwanese pineapple exports went to the mainland Chinese market.

The Chinese government's statement was questioned and denied by the Taiwanese government. In response to the ban, the Taiwanese government asked its citizens and diplomatic allies to increase their consumption of Taiwanese pineapples, and promised financial assistance to any farmers who saw losses as a result of the ban. The Freedom Pineapple campaign was launched by ROC Foreign Minister Joseph Wu on Twitter.

== Response ==
As a result of the ban, Taiwanese pineapples became a political symbol both at home and in the region. The term “Freedom pineapples” was coined as a play on "freedom fries".

=== Taiwan ===
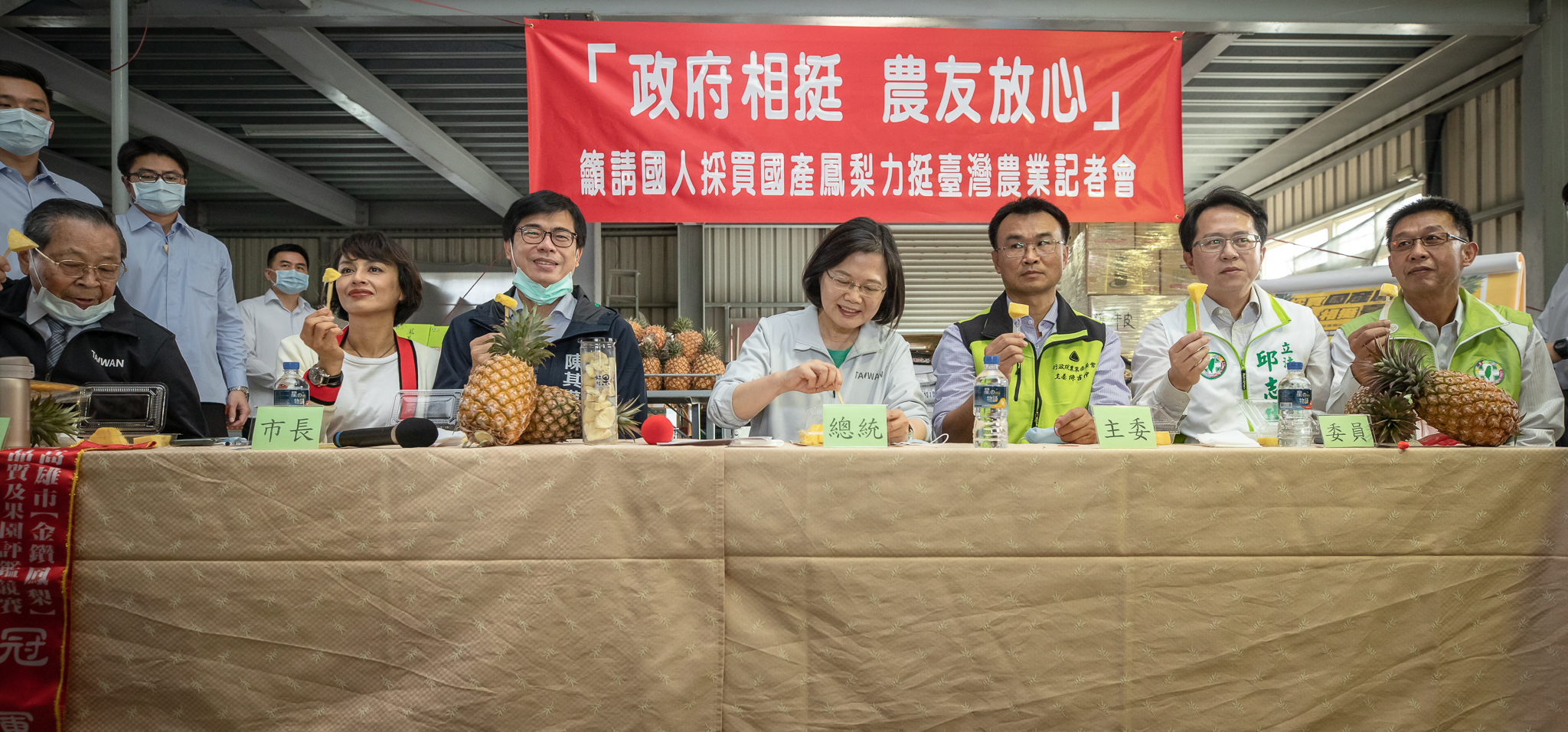
President Tsai Ing-wen showing support for pineapple farmers in Kaohsiung on 28 February 2021.

As an initiative to support Taiwanese pineapple farmers, Taiwanese President Tsai Ing-wen launched a social media campaign called "Eat Taiwan's pineapples until you burst," which encouraged citizens to increase their consumption of local pineapples. Restaurants went to great lengths to incorporate pineapple into dishes such as beef noodle soup.

Since the import ban followed PRC Premier Li Keqiang's assurance that mainland China was seeking to promote peaceful relations with Taiwan, the mixed messaging soon inflamed Taiwanese public opinion against mainland China. The situation has resulted in a consolidation of Taiwanese identity across the political spectrum. The main opposition party Kuomintang (KMT) also encouraged people to eat more local pineapple.

Taiwanese firms placed large additional orders for local pineapples. Taiwanese farmers have begun diverting non-pineapple exports from mainland China to other markets due to worries that their product could be next.

=== Japan, Australia and the US ===
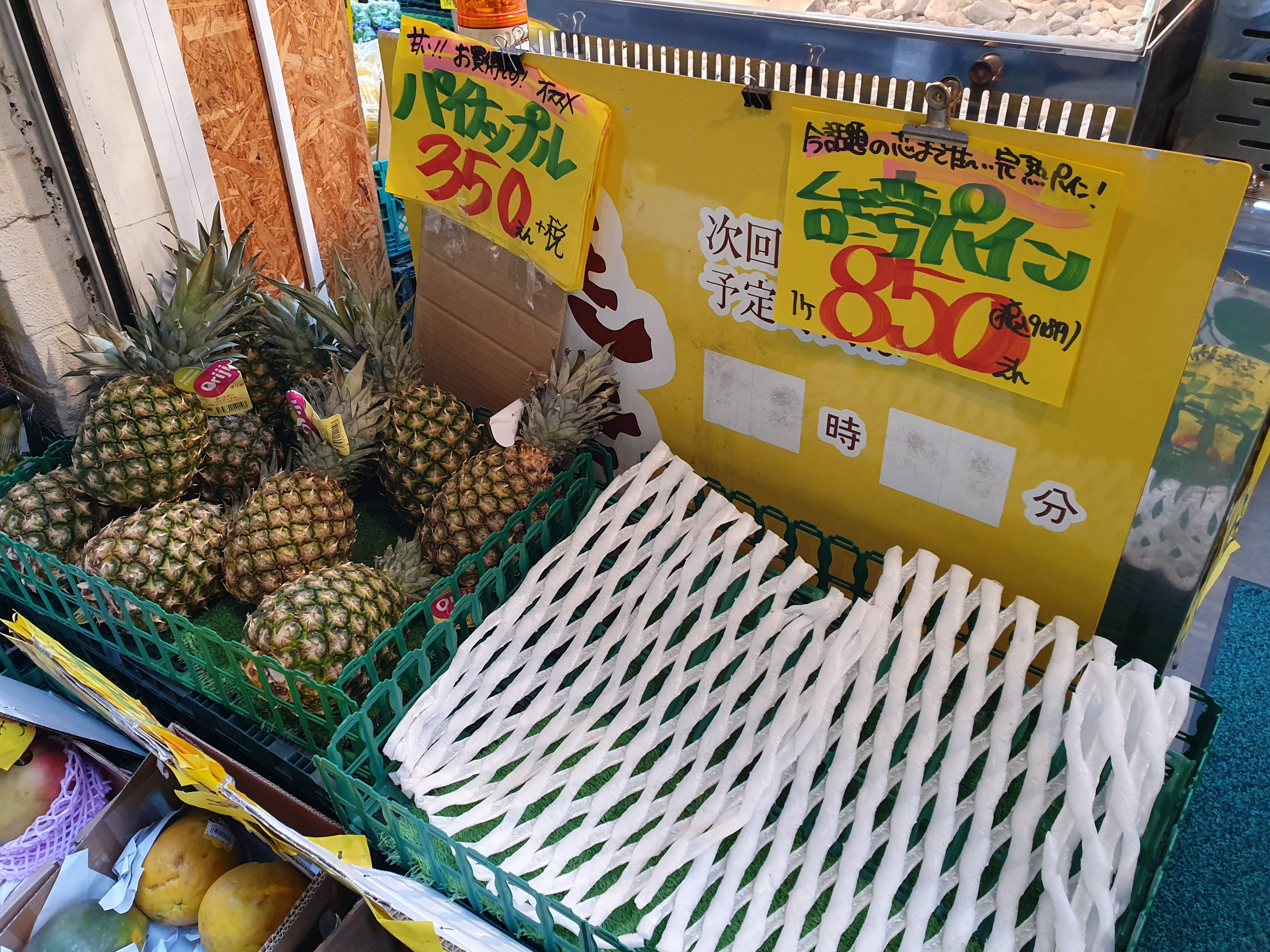
In Japan, Taiwanese pineapples sold out despite being sold at a significant premium to regular pineapples.

The event received heavy coverage in Japan, with supermarkets selling out of pineapples and large orders being placed. A foodie music group in Japan released a music video about the situation. Sales also increased in Hong Kong, which was not subject to the PRC's import ban. The freedom pineapple campaign has also received support in Australia, with parallels being drawn to Chinese tariff increases on Australian wine.

The “Freedom Pineapples” initiative received support from the American Institute in Taiwan and the Canadian Trade Office in Taipei, the de facto embassies of allies such as Canada and the United States with the Canadians referencing the Canadian invention pineapple pizza.

In April 2021, former American Secretary of State Mike Pompeo tweeted a picture of himself eating dried Taiwanese pineapple while playing chess, using the hashtag #FreedomPineapple.

== Aftermath ==
In 2021, Taiwanese pineapple exports decreased to 28 million metric tons, down to 55% of the 2019 peak of 51 million metric tons. Further blocks on Taiwanese fruit imports to mainland China followed. In 2023, mango imports were restricted following Chinese allegations that mealybugs had been found on imported fruit.

== See also ==
- Pineapple production in Taiwan
- Freedom fries
- Yun Hai
- Kherson watermelon
- ONGLAISAT
