= Transit diplomacy =

Taiwanese foreign policy

Transit diplomacy (Chinese: 過境外交), or stopover diplomacy, is a foreign policy approach in the context of Taiwan–United States relations wherein Taiwanese leaders make a stop in the United States during a tour or visit to Taiwan's formal diplomatic allies. Since United States severed diplomatic relations with Taiwan in favor of the People's Republic of China (PRC) in 1979, the Taiwanese government has not been able to formally conduct diplomatic exchanges with the U.S. Presidents or vice presidents have since made "stopovers" in the U.S. as part of broader visits to diplomatic allies in order to meet with U.S. officials.

== Background ==
In 1979, the United States recognized the PRC and severed ties with the Taiwanese government, ending official contacts between Taiwan and the U.S.

In 1994, Taiwanese president Lee Teng-hui was on a trip to Costa Rica and requested a brief stopover in Hawaii. The Clinton administration permitted his flight to be refueled but refused to let him enter Honolulu to spend a night. Additionally, the reception for Lee was going to take place in a small dingy room in Hickam Air Force Base. This angered Lee, and in protest, he refused to disembark the plane. When the U.S. representative boarded the plane to greet him, Lee was in his sweater and slippers. Lee refused to meet the representative at the door, as he stated sarcastically, "I might slip and enter America."

In 1995, after president Lee Teng-hui visited his alma mater Cornell University, the PRC government broke off semiofficial contacts and escalated military tensions, initiating the Third Taiwan Strait Crisis.

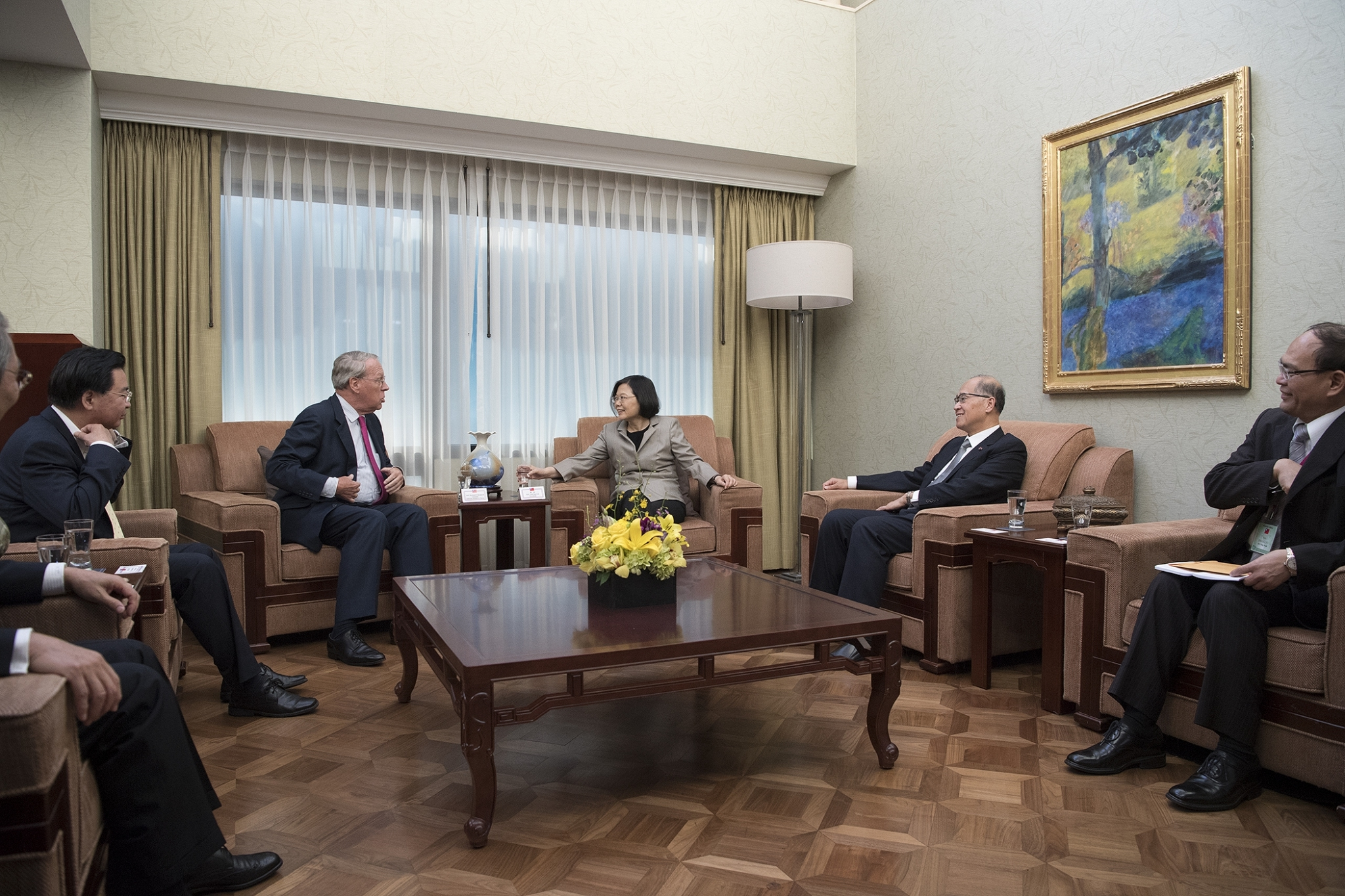
President Tsai Ing-wen's 2016 stopover in Los Angeles included a meeting with American Institute in Taiwan chairman Raymond Burghardt

Although the transits are "unofficial" in nature, they offer opportunities for Taiwanese presidents or vice presidents to have phone calls with high-level U.S. officials, or hold private clandestine meetings with officials.

== List of transits ==
Date	President	Location	Countries visited	Details	Ref.
1997	Lee Teng-hui	Hawaii	Panama, Honduras, El Salvador, Paraguay	Meeting with former Hawaii governor George Ariyoshi and AIT chairman Richard C. Bush	
2000	Chen Shui-bian	Los Angeles		Meeting with House Representative Dana Rohrabacher	
2005	Chen Shui-bian	Miami	Dominican Republic, Guatemala, Nicaragua, Saint Kitts and Nevis, Saint Vincent and the Grenadines		
2007	Chen Shui-bian	Anchorage, Alaska	Honduras		
2014	Ma Ying-jeou	Los Angeles	São Tomé and Príncipe, Burkina Faso, Honduras		
2016	Tsai Ing-wen	Miami, Los Angeles	Panama, Paraguay		
2017	Tsai Ing-wen	Houston, San Francisco	Honduras, Nicaragua, Guatemala, El Salvador	Meeting with Texas senator Ted Cruz and governor Greg Abbott	
2017	Tsai Ing-wen	Honolulu, Guam	Marshall Islands, Tuvalu, Solomon Islands	Visit to USS Arizona Memorial and meeting with Guam governor Eddie Baza Calvo	
2019	Tsai Ing-wen	Hawaii	Palau, Nauru, Marshall Islands		
2019	Tsai Ing-wen	New York City, Denver	Haiti, Saint Kitts and Nevis, Saint Vincent and the Grenadines, Saint Lucia	Meeting with Colorado governor Jared Pollis and visit to National Center for Atmospheric Research (NCAR)	
2023	Tsai Ing-wen	New York City, Simi Valley	Guatemala, Belize	Meetings with House Minority Leader Hakeem Jeffries in New York and Speaker Kevin McCarthy in Simi Valley	
2024	Lai Ching-te	Guam, Hawaii	Marshall Islands, Tuvalu, Palau	Meeting with Hawaii governor Josh Green	
