= Ailiao River =

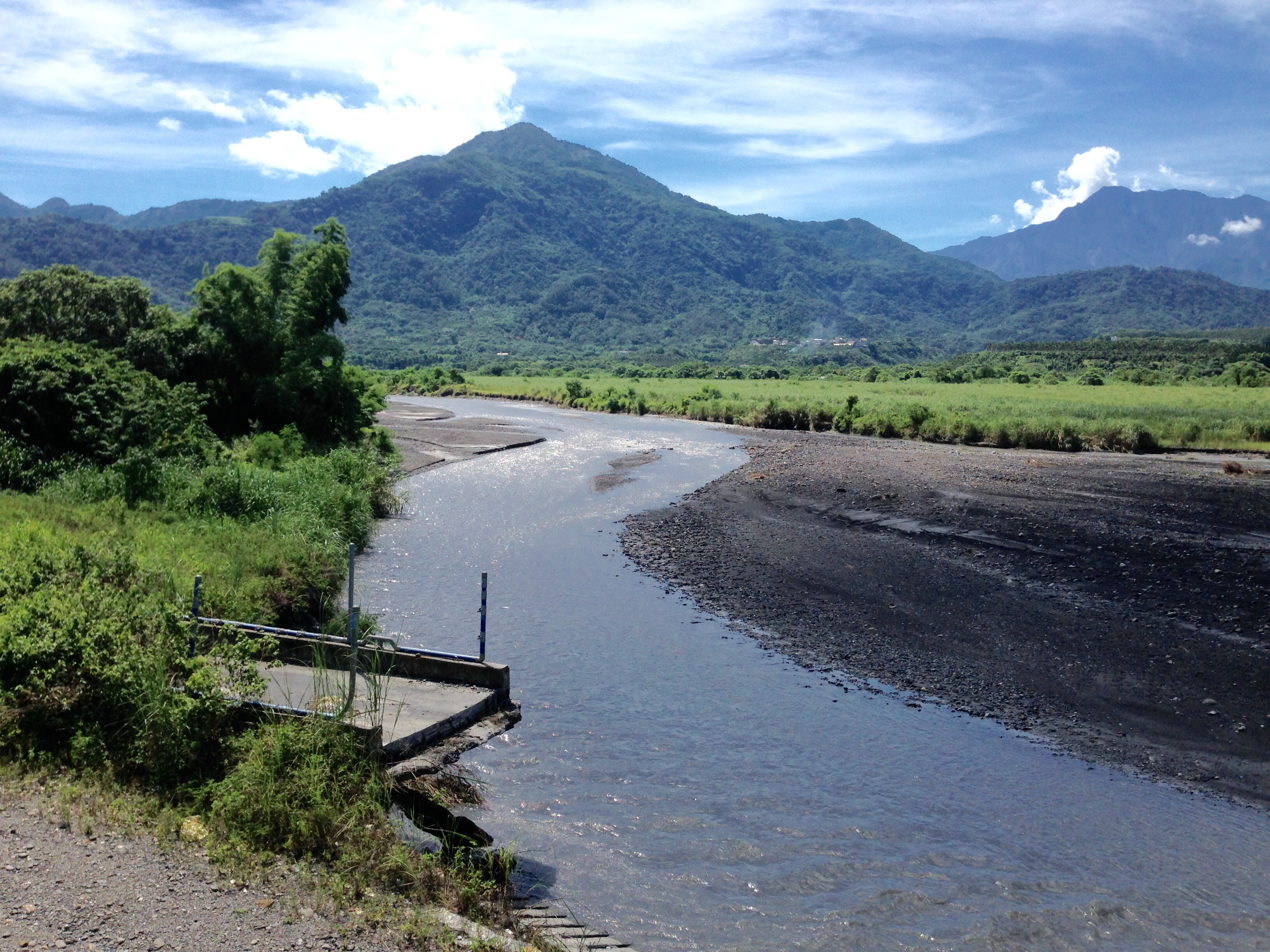

- The confluence of the Ailiao and Gaoping Rivers

Location
- Country: Taiwan

Physical characteristics
- Mouth
  - location: Ligang
  - coordinates: 22.795°N 120.513°E
- Length: 68.5 km (42.6 mi)
- Basin size: 642 km^{2} (248 sq mi)
- Discharge
  - location: Sandimen Bridge
  - average: 36.6 m^{3}/s (1,290 cu ft/s)
  - minimum: 0 m^{3}/s (0 cu ft/s)
  - maximum: 3,560 m^{3}/s (126,000 cu ft/s)

Basin features
- River system: Gaoping River

The Ailiao River (Chinese: 隘寮溪; pinyin: Àiliáo Xī) is a tributary of the Gaoping River in Taiwan. It flows through Kaohsiung City and Pingtung County for 68.5 km.

== See also ==
- List of rivers in Taiwan
