= Wutai, Pingtung =

Mountain indigenous township in Pingtung County, Taiwan

Coordinates: 22.75°N 120.73°E

Wutai Township 霧臺鄉
- Mountain indigenous township
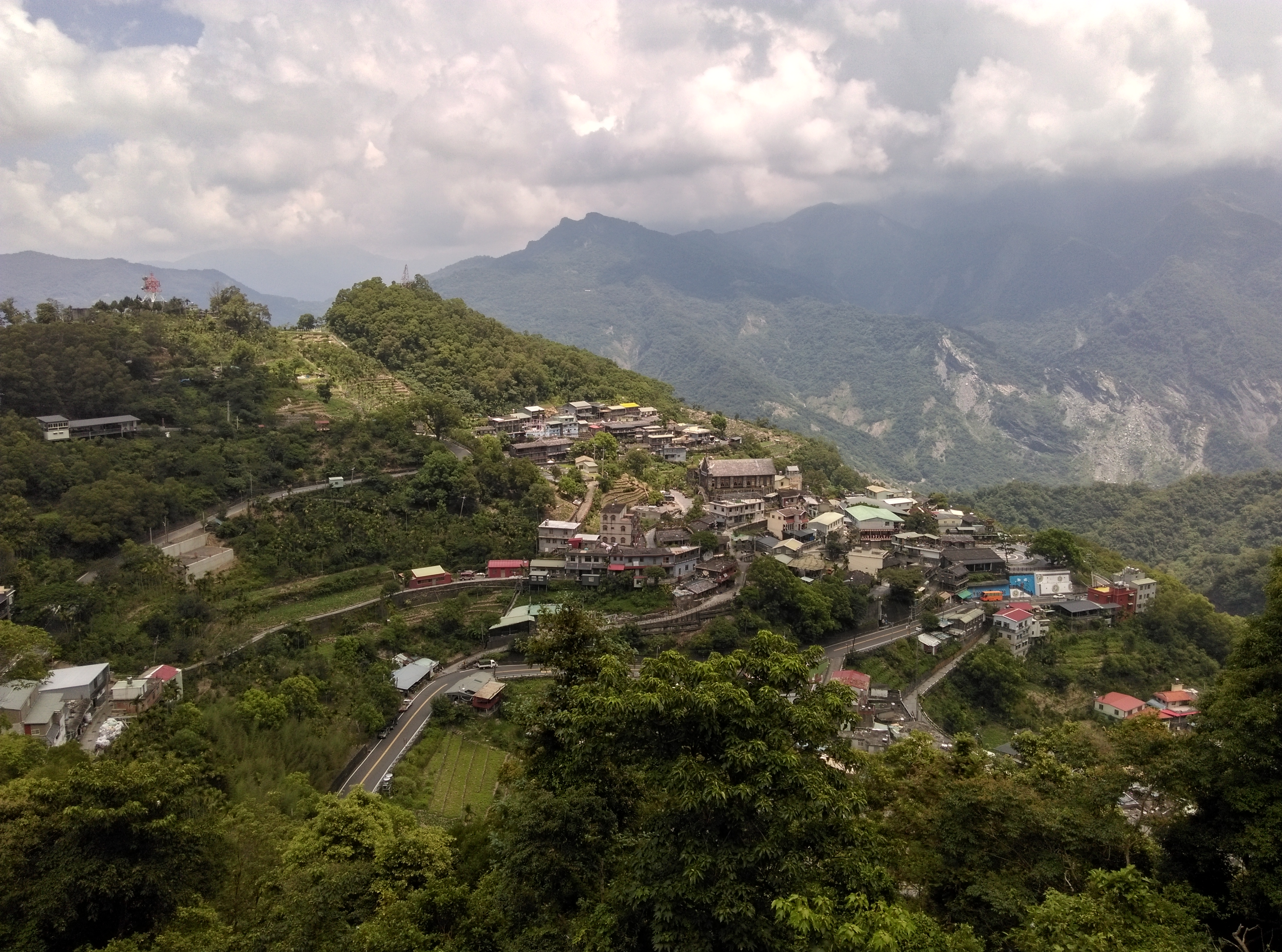
- Wutai Village

- Wutai Township in Pingtung County
- Location: Pingtung County, Taiwan

Area
  - Total: 279 km^{2} (108 sq mi)

Population (February 2024)
  - Total: 3,266
  - Density: 11.7/km^{2} (30.3/sq mi)

Wutai Township (Chinese: 霧臺鄉; pinyin: Wùtái Xiāng; Rukai language: Vedai) is a mountain indigenous township in Pingtung County, Taiwan. It has a population total of 3,266 and an area of 278.80 square kilometres (107.65 sq mi).

== History ==
During the Japanese era, Wutai was grouped with modern-day Sandimen Township and Majia Township as "Aboriginal Areas" (Japanese: 蕃地), which was governed under Heitō District, Takao Prefecture.

== Demographics ==
The township is mainly inhabited by the Rukai people.

== Administrative divisions ==
The township comprises six villages: Ali, Dawu, Haocha, Jiamu, Jilou and Wutai.

== Tourist attractions ==
- Guchuan Bridge
- Kucapungane, an ancient Rukai village with houses built of shale slabs
