= Kucapungane =

Kucapungane Haocha Village (好茶村)
- Location of Kucapungane in Taiwan
- Coordinates: 22°40′44″N 120°46′10″E
- Country: Taiwan
- County: Pingtung
- Township: Wutai
- Elevation: 1,000 m (3,300 ft)

Population (October 2015)
  - Total: 2

Kucapungane (alternatively spelled Kochapongane) is a Rukai aboriginal village in the mountains of southern Taiwan. Virtually abandoned since the 1970s, the village is well-known for its slate houses, and is listed on the 2016 World Monuments Watchlist as an endangered site. Successive typhoons and earthquakes have made access to the village increasingly difficult, and at present the only way to reach it is on foot over unstable mountainous terrain.

== History ==
The settlement of Kucapungane pre-dates Taiwan's recorded history, with Rukai legend placing its foundation at around 600 years ago. The legend tells of a hunting party tracking a clouded leopard until it stopped at a pond and would not move any further. Kucapungane was built on this site. A resident of Kucapungane, Shikieyan, later stated that the Rukai moved to Kucapungane from Guhaocha because a river near Guhaocha dried up in the winter. The village consists of 163 houses constructed entirely from slate. Elders made the decision in 1974 to resettle the population closer to modern amenities such as healthcare and electricity. New Haocha village, where many of the Kucapungane Rukai moved, is a concrete settlement typical of modern Taiwan.

== Geography ==
Administratively Kucapungane is part of Wutai township in Pingtung County, Taiwan. The settlement is also known as "Old Haocha Village" (Chinese: 舊好茶村; pinyin: Jiù Hǎochá Cūn).

== Current status ==
As Kucapungane is quite remote and routes linking it to the outside world have been damaged in typhoons, it is currently quite difficult to access. Rukai elders have requested that the Haocha bridge – destroyed during typhoon Morakot in 2009 – be restored to allow them easier access to the village. Vegetation has taken over the village and many of the buildings are in a dilapidated state. Pingtung County officials have mooted promoting the village as a tourist attraction. Rukai people have highlighted the loss of traditional Rukai life and customs since the move away from the village, and it is this intangible cultural heritage that forms part of the reason Kucapungane was identified as an endangered site on the World Monuments Watchlist by the World Monuments Fund.
