= Sandimen =

Mountain indigenous township in Pingtung County, Taiwan

Coordinates: 22°43′N 120°39′E

Sandimen Township 三地門鄉
- Mountain indigenous township
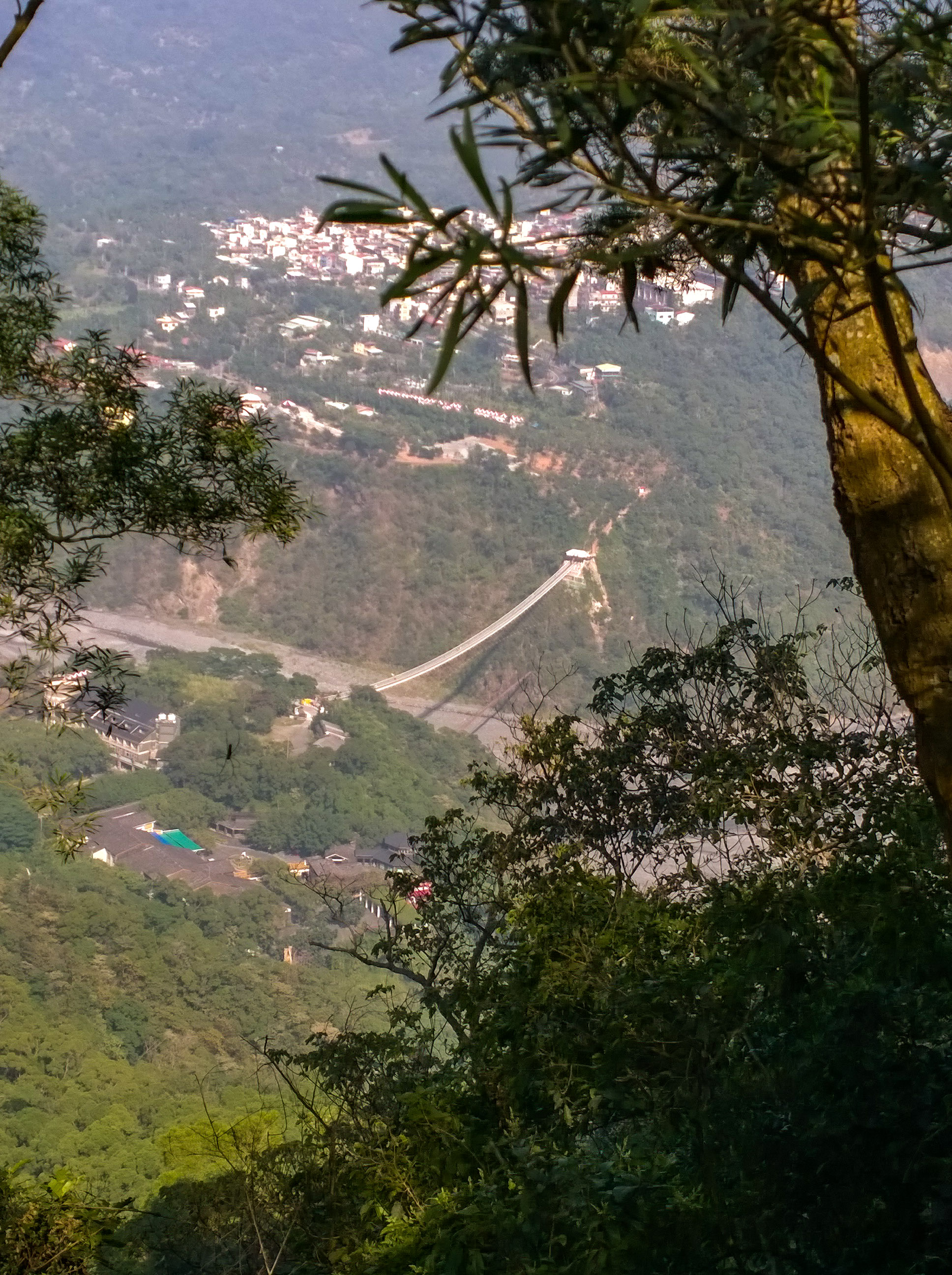

- Sandimen Township in Pingtung County
- Location: Pingtung County, Taiwan Province, Republic of China

Area
  - Total: 196 km^{2} (76 sq mi)

Population (February 2024)
  - Total: 7,717
  - Density: 39.4/km^{2} (102/sq mi)

Sandimen Township
- Traditional Chinese: 三地門鄉
Transcriptions
Standard Mandarin
- Hanyu Pinyin: Sāndìmén Xiāng
- Wade–Giles: San^{1}-ti^{4}-men^{2} Hsiang^{1}
Hakka
- Pha̍k-fa-sṳ: Sâm-thi-mùn-hiông
Southern Min
- Hokkien POJ: Sam-tē-mn̂g-hiong

Alternative Chinese name
- Traditional Chinese: 山地門
Transcriptions
Standard Mandarin
- Hanyu Pinyin: Shāndìmén
Southern Min
- Hokkien POJ: Soaⁿ-tē-mn̂g

Sandimen Township is a mountain indigenous township in Pingtung County, Taiwan Province, Republic of China. The population of the township consists mainly of the Paiwan people with a substantial Rukai minority.

== Names ==
Ethnic Chinese settlers homophonically translated the original Paiwan name (Paiwan: setjimur, lit. 'people of Tjimur communinty') into Hokkien (Chinese: 山豬毛; Pe̍h-ōe-jī: Soaⁿ-ti-mn̂g; lit. 'wild-boar bristle'; or 山地門; Soaⁿ-tē-mn̂g; 'mountains-gate'). Under Japanese rule the name was Sanchimon (Japanese: 山地門). Following the handover of Taiwan from Japan to the Republic of China in 1945, the area became Sandimeng Township (三地盟鄉; Sāndìméng Xiāng) but the name was changed again in 1947 to Sandi Township (Chinese: 三地鄉; pinyin: Sāndì Xiāng; Pe̍h-ōe-jī: Sam-tē-hiong) but the Taiwanese pronunciation of Soaⁿ-tē-mn̂g continued to be commonly used. In August 1992, the township assumed its current name.

== History ==
During the Japanese era, Sandimen was grouped with modern-day Majia Township and Wutai Township as "Aboriginal Areas" (蕃地), which was governed under Heitō District (屏東郡) of Takao Prefecture. Following the Kuomintang takeover of Taiwan in 1945, Sandimen was assigned to Kaohsiung County and, on 16 August 1950, it became a part of the newly established Pingtung County.

== Geography ==
- Population: 7,717 people (February 2024)
- Area: 196.4 square kilometres (75.8 sq mi)

== Administrative divisions ==
The township comprises 10 villages: Anpo, Dalai, Dashe, Dewen, Jingshan, Jingye, Koushe, Mani, Saijia and Sande.

== Tourist attractions ==
- Guchuan Bridge
- Maolin National Scenic Area
