= Ligang Bridge =

Bridge in Taiwan

Ligang Bridge 里港大橋
- Coordinates: 22°45′52″N 120°27′13″E
- Crosses: Gaoping River
- Locale: Taiwan
- Begins: Dashu, Kaohsiung
- Ends: Jiuru, Pingtung County

Characteristics
- Total length: 2,617 meters
- Longest span: 330 meters

The Ligang Bridge (Chinese: 里港大橋; pinyin: Lǐgǎng Dàqiáo; Pe̍h-ōe-jī: Lí-káng Tōa-kiô) is a cable-stayed bridge in Taiwan. It carries Freeway 3 (Second Southern Freeway) across the Gaoping River from Dashu District, Kaohsiung in the northwest and entering Jiuru Township, Pingtung County (although it is named for nearby Ligang).

It measures 2,617 meters (8,586 feet) long. The tower is 183.5 m (602 ft) tall (roughly the height of a 65-story building). The side span is 180 m (590 ft) long, while the main span is 330 m (1,080 ft) long.

== See also ==
- List of bridges in Taiwan
- Transportation in Taiwan
