= Gaoping River =

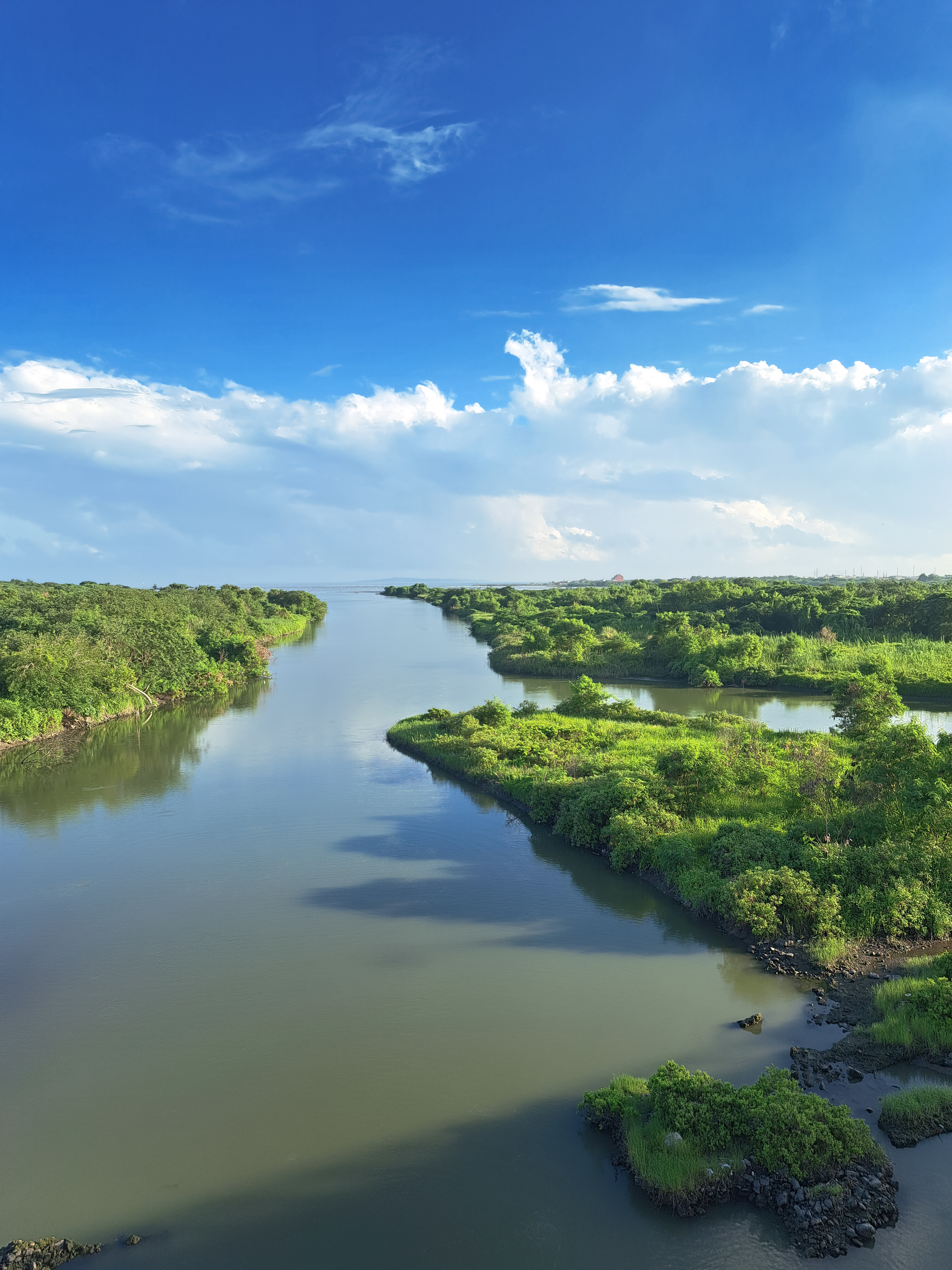
- The mouth of Gaoping River

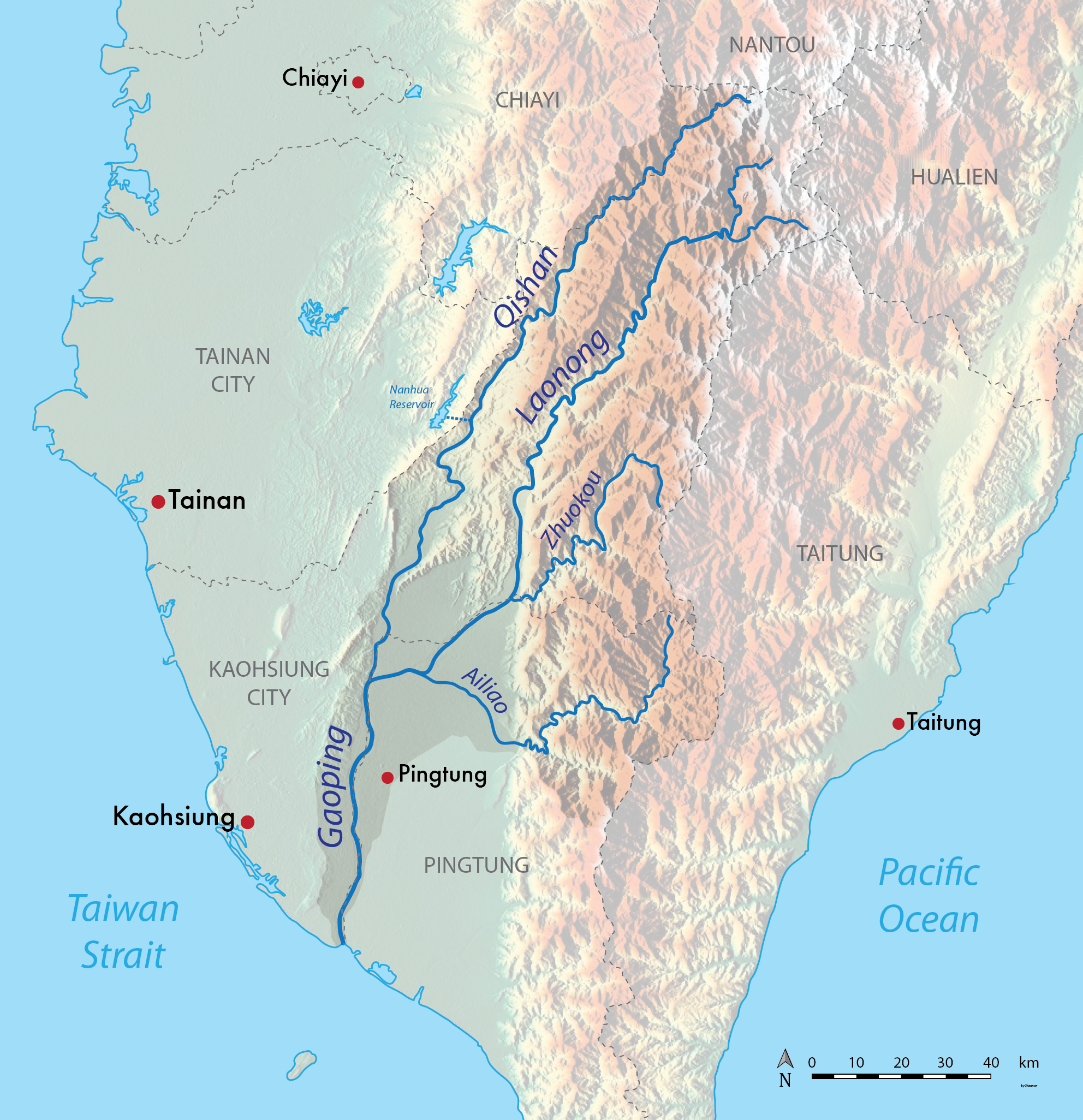
- Location of the Gaoping River basin in southern Taiwan
- Native name: 高屏溪 (Chinese)

Location
- Country: Taiwan

Physical characteristics
- Source: Yushan
  - coordinates: 23°28′29″N 120°02′15″E
  - elevation: 3,400 m (11,200 ft)
- Mouth: Taiwan Strait
  - location: Linyuan District, Kaohsiung City
  - coordinates: 22°28′59″N 120°34′47″E
  - elevation: 0 m (0 ft)
- Length: 184 km (114 mi)
- Basin size: 3,257 km^{2} (1,258 sq mi)
- Discharge
  - location: Liling Bridge (daily means)
  - average: 268 m^{3}/s (9,500 cu ft/s)
  - minimum: 9 m^{3}/s (320 cu ft/s)
  - maximum: 15,251 m^{3}/s (538,600 cu ft/s)

The Gaoping River, also spelled Kaoping River (Chinese: 高屏溪; pinyin: Gāopíng Xī; Wade–Giles: Kao^{1}-p'ing^{2} Hsi^{1}), is the second longest river in Taiwan after Zhuoshui River with a total length of 184 km (114 mi). It is located on the southern part of the island, flowing through Pingtung County and Kaohsiung City. It is the largest river in Taiwan by drainage area. Draining a rugged area on the western side of the Central Mountain Range.

== Characteristics ==
The Gaoping River headwaters originate near Yushan in northern Kaohsiung’s Tauyuan District and a small part of southern Nantou County. The upper section of the river, known as the Laonong, flows through a series of rugged canyons, through Liouguei and Gaoshu, and is joined by the Zhuokou River. The Laonong emerges from the mountains at Meinong as a wide braided stream and after being joined by the Ailiao from the east, the Gaoping proper is formed, which flows about 50 kilometres (31 mi) south along the coastal plain, through Pingtung County, emptying into the Taiwan Strait in Linyuan District. The Qishan River and the Wuluo River flow into the lower section of the Gaoping from north and east, respectively.

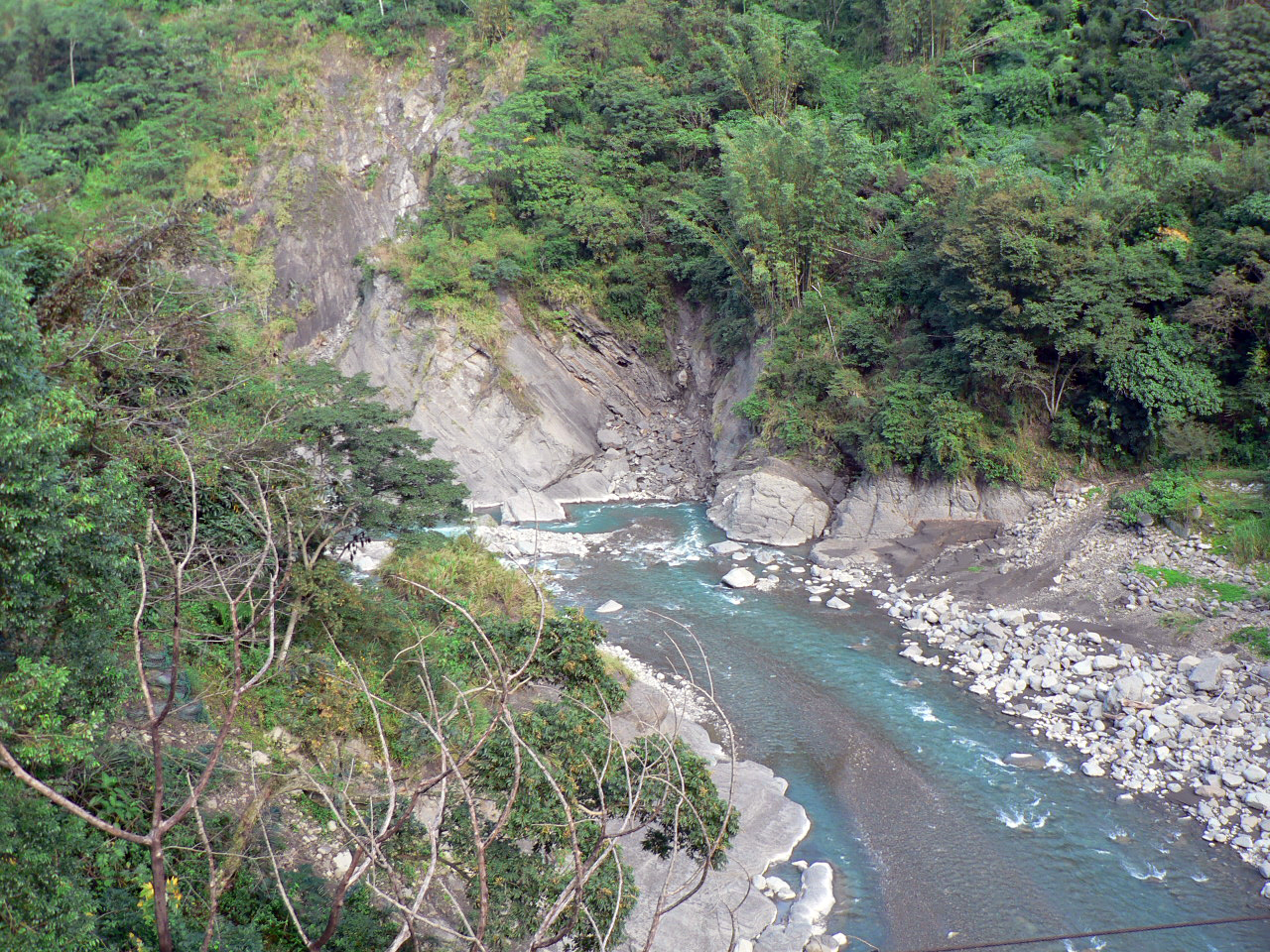
Headwaters of the Gaoping River

With an average annual discharge of 8.45 cubic kilometres (6,850,000 acre⋅ft), the Gaoping River is the second largest of Taiwan’s rivers by volume, following the Tamsui River. About 90 percent of the precipitation, and consequently about 70–90 percent of the total flow, occurs during the rainy season from May to October. Like many Taiwanese rivers, the Gaoping carries large amounts of silt, ranging from 36 to 49 million tons per year; it is the second largest river in Taiwan (after the Zhuoshui River) in terms of suspended-sediment load.

Almost half the total basin has an elevation greater than 1,000 metres (3,300 ft). Only about 20 percent of the basin is lower than 100 metres (330 ft) in elevation. The Kaoping River valley is generally considered the boundary between the Alishan Range on the west and the higher Yushan Range to the east.

The Gaoping River basin is home to at least 66 fish species, 14 of which are endemic. Cyprinid fish Opsariichthys kaopingensis is named after the river.

== History ==
During Japanese rule the Gaoping River was known as the Shimo Tansui-kei (下淡水溪). The Japanese colonial government built the Shimo-Tansui Railway Bridge (now known as the Old Gaoping River Iron Bridge), at the time the longest iron bridge in Asia. The bridge was designed by engineer Toyoji Īda (飯田豊二). Due to the unpredictable nature of the river the bridge took eight years to complete, at the cost of 42 lives.

On August 27, 2000, flooding damaged a bridge across the Gaoping River causing 16 vehicles to fall into the water, injuring 22 people.

In 2009 Typhoon Morakot caused severe flooding along the Gaoping River. About 3 metres (120 in) of rain (one year’s typical precipitation) fell over the Gaoping River basin in a period of three days. The river flow peaked at 27,447 cubic metres per second (969,300 cu ft/s) on August 8, and exceeded 20,000 cubic metres per second (710,000 cu ft/s) for a total of nine hours. Several towns along the upper river were destroyed by flooding and landslides, killing up to 500 people. The flow of the river was so strong that it created currents of up to 60 kilometres (37 mi) per hour in the Taiwan Strait, damaging or destroying eight submarine cables.

== Human use ==
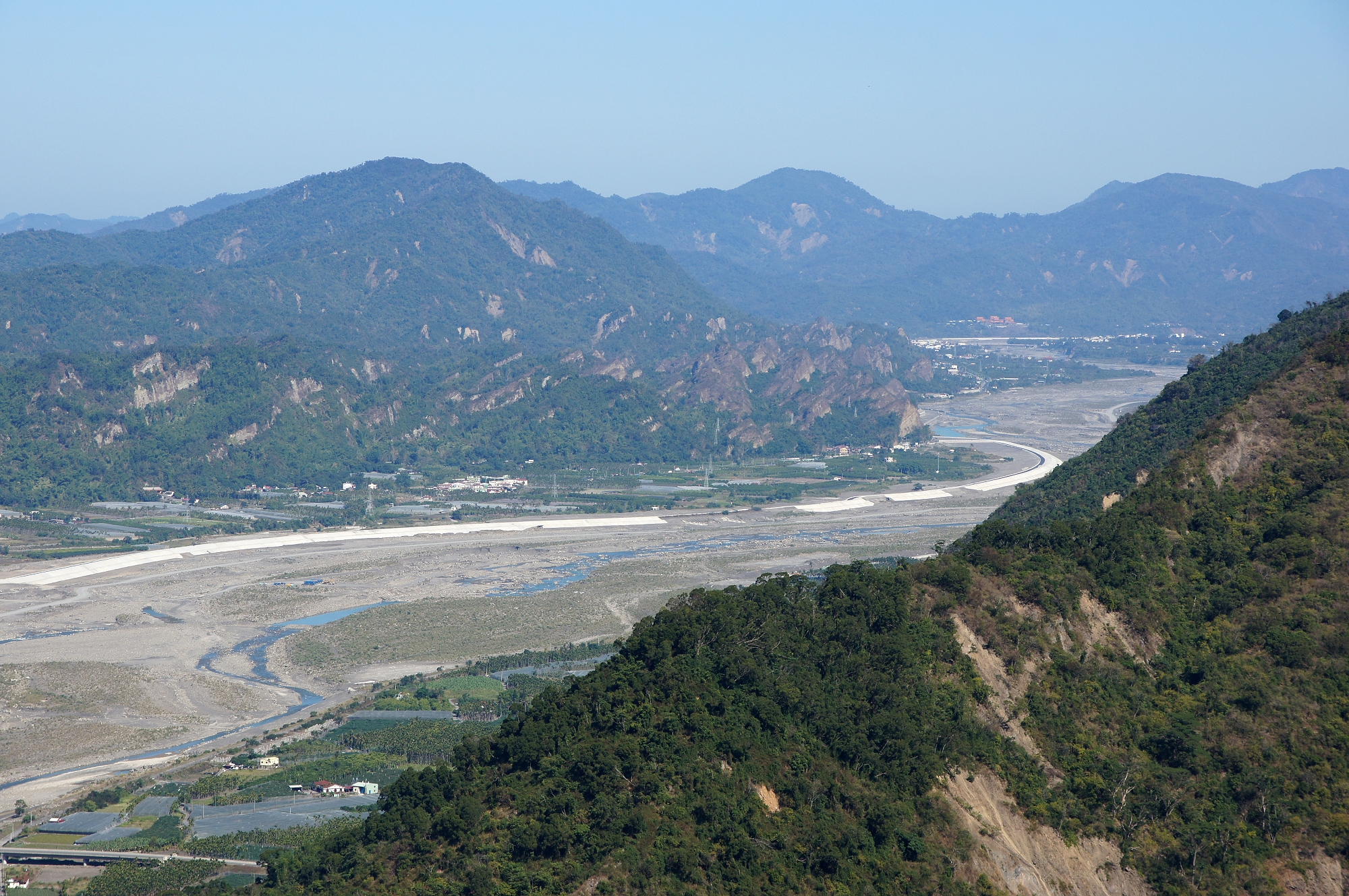
The Laonong River tributary in Liouguei, where it would have been diverted to the proposed Meinong Reservoir

The Gaoping is one of the few rivers in western Taiwan without a major dam in its basin. However, the river is used extensively for irrigation on the Pingtung plain and its tributaries supply water for domestic and industrial use. The Qishan River tributary is diverted to fill Nanhua Reservoir, which provides nearly 90% of the water supply for Kaohsiung City.

In the 1950s the Meinong Dam was proposed as a water supply project for Kaohsiung City. It would have consisted of a large off-stream reservoir in the northern part of Meinong District, with a storage capacity of 328 million m^{3} (266,000 acre feet) and an annual water yield of 46.2 million m^{3} (37,400 acre feet). The water would be diverted from the Laonong segment of the Gaoping River within Liouguei District and transported to the reservoir via a tunnel. The project was officially overturned in 2000 by then-President Chen Shui-bian, who stated, “As long as there are alternative ways to supply water to the greater Kaohsiung area, it is not necessary to build the Meinung [sic] Dam.” The dam would have flooded an area culturally significant to the Hakka people.

The lower part of the river is heavily polluted by runoff from factories and livestock operations, especially from pigs and chickens. A significant amount of contamination originates from the Wuluo River tributary. Up to 65% of the pollution is caused by runoff from swine farms, with another 21% from industry, 13% from domestic waste and 2% from landfills.

== Transportation ==
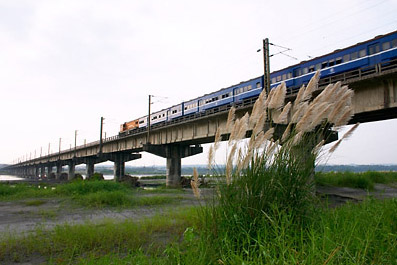
TRA bridge crossing the Gaoping River

Provincial Highway No. 20, which provides access between Pingtung County and Taitung County, follows the Gaoping River for about 40 kilometres (25 mi) between Liouguei and Haiduan Township.

The Ligang Cable-Stayed Bridge crosses the Gaoping on Freeway 3 (Second Southern Freeway) from Kaohsiung to Pingtung County.

== Bridges ==
- Kao-Ping Hsi Bridge
- Ligang Bridge

== Tributaries ==
The main tributaries, from upstream to downstream, are:

- Laonong River – Kaohsiung City – 136 km
  - Zhuokou River – Kaohsiung City – 50 km
- Ailiao River – Kaohsiung City, Pingtung County – 67 km
- Qishan River – Kaohsiung City, Pingtung County – 117 km
- Wuluo River – Pingtung County

== See also ==
- List of rivers in Taiwan
