= List of presidents of the Judicial Yuan =

President of the Judicial Yuan
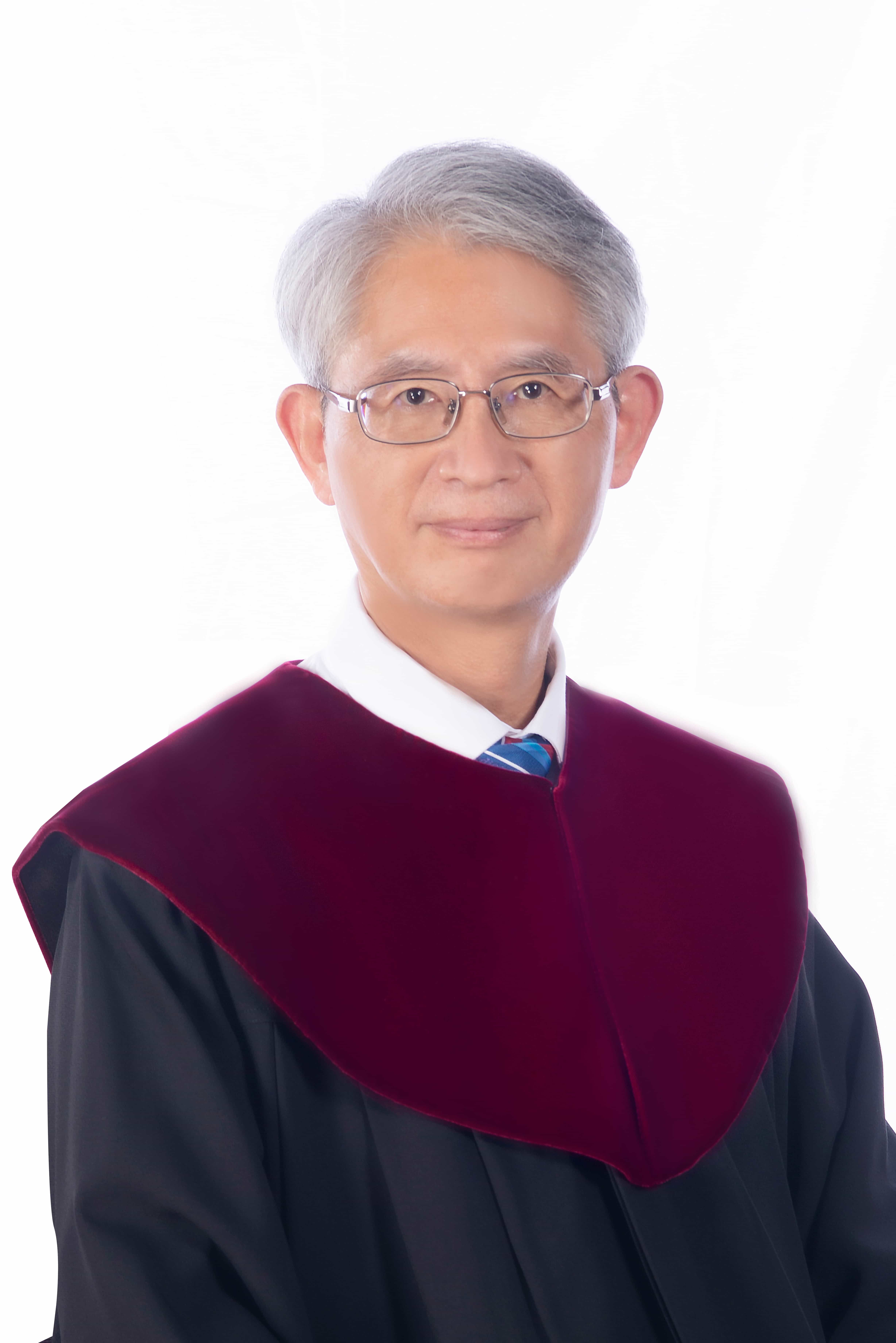
- Incumbent; Shieh Ming-yan acting since 1 November 2024
- Nominator: President
- Appointer: Legislative Yuan
- Term length: 8 years
- Inaugural holder: Wang Chong-hui
- Formation: 1928; 98 years ago
- Website: www.judicial.gov.tw

This is a list of presidents of the Judicial Yuan of the Republic of China. This position is also called the chief justice since the 4th constitutional amendment in 1997, which mandated that the position holder shall also be a justice in the Constitutional Court.

== List ==
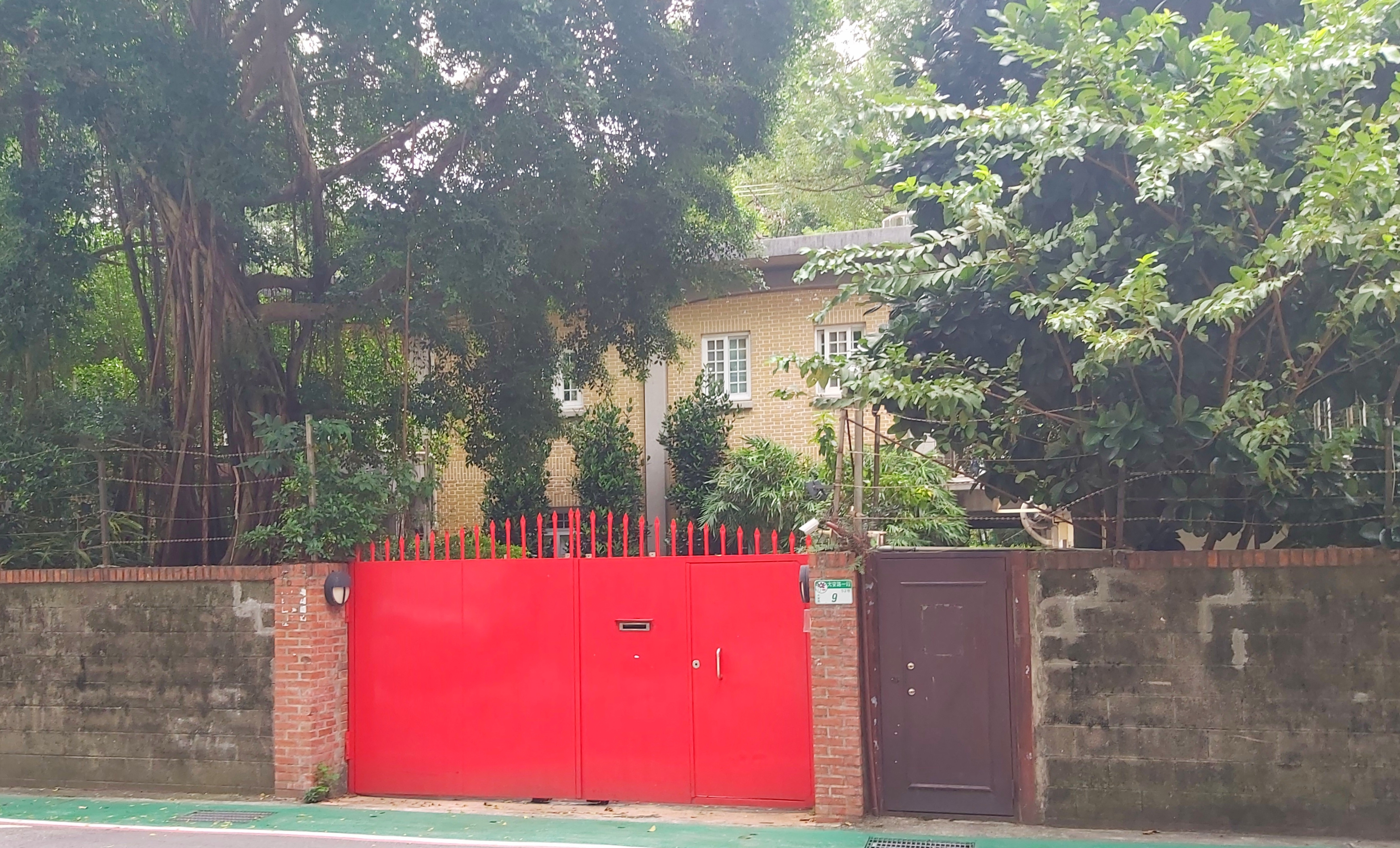
Official residence of President of the Judicial Yuan, since 1998.

Non-partisan Kuomintang (Nationalist)

=== Before 1947 Constitution ===
- Period: 1928 – 1948

№	Portrait	Name (Birth–Death)	Term of office		Political party	Chairman
1		Wang Ch'ung-hui 王寵惠; Wáng Chǒnghuì (1881–1958)	Nov 1928	Jan 1932	Kuomintang	Tan Yankai, Chiang Kai-shek, Lin Sen
2		Wu Chaoshu 伍朝樞; Wǔ Cháoshū (1887–1934)	Jan 1932	Mar 1932	Kuomintang	Lin Sen
2		Wu Chaoshu 伍朝樞; Wǔ Cháoshū (1887–1934)	Did not take office.			
3		Ju Zheng 居正; Jū Zhèng (1876–1951)	Mar 1932	1 Jul 1948	Kuomintang	Lin Sen, Chiang Kai-shek

=== Post-1947 Constitution ===
- Period: 1948 – 1999

№	Portrait	Name (Birth–Death)	Term of office		Political party	President of the Republic
1		Wang Ch'ung-hui 王寵惠; Wáng Chǒnghuì (1881–1958)	2 Jul 1948	15 Mar 1958	Kuomintang	Chiang Kai-shek
1		Wang Ch'ung-hui 王寵惠; Wáng Chǒnghuì (1881–1958)	Died in office.			
–		Hsieh Kuan-sheng 謝冠生; Xiè Guànshēng (1897–1971)	18 Mar 1958	14 Jun 1958	Kuomintang	Chiang Kai-shek
–		Hsieh Kuan-sheng 謝冠生; Xiè Guànshēng (1897–1971)	Acting.			
2		Hsieh Kuan-sheng 謝冠生; Xiè Guànshēng (1897–1971)	14 Jun 1958	1 Dec 1971	Kuomintang	Chiang Kai-shek
3		Tien Chung-chin 田炯錦; Tián Jiǒngjǐn (1899–1977)	1 Dec 1971	30 Mar 1977	Kuomintang	Chiang Kai-shek, Yen Chia-kan
3		Tien Chung-chin 田炯錦; Tián Jiǒngjǐn (1899–1977)	Died in office.			
4		Tai Yen-hui 戴炎輝; Dài Yánhuī (1909–1992)	20 Apr 1977	1 Jul 1979	Kuomintang	Yen Chia-kan, Chiang Ching-kuo
4		Tai Yen-hui 戴炎輝; Dài Yánhuī (1909–1992)	First JY President of Taiwanese ancestry.			
5		Huang Shao-ku 黃少谷; Huáng Shàogǔ (1901–1996)	1 Jul 1979	1 May 1987	Kuomintang	Chiang Ching-kuo
6		Lin Yang-kang 林洋港; Lín Yánggǎng (1927–2013)	1 May 1987	1 Sep 1994	Kuomintang	Chiang Ching-kuo, Lee Teng-hui
7		Shih Chi-yang 施啟揚; Shī Qǐyáng (1935–2019)	1 Sep 1994	25 Jan 1999	Kuomintang	Lee Teng-hui
–		Lu Yu-wen 呂有文; Lǚ Yǒuwén (1926–1999)	25 Jan 1999	1 Feb 1999	Independent	Lee Teng-hui
–		Lu Yu-wen 呂有文; Lǚ Yǒuwén (1926–1999)	Acting			

=== Post-1947 Constitution (1997 Constitution amendment) ===
- Period: 1999 –

Under the 4th constitutional amendment in 1997, the President of Judicial Yuan shall also be a justice. All presidents are unaffiliated to any party since then.

No.	Portrait	Name (Birth–Death)	Term of office		Note	President of the Republic
1		Weng Yueh-sheng 翁岳生; Wēng Yuèshēng (Mandarin); Ang Ga̍k-seng (Taiwanese); Vûng Ngo̍k-sâng (Hakka) (1932– )	1 Feb 1999	30 Sep 2007		Lee Teng-hui, Chen Shui-bian
2		Lai In-jaw 賴英照; Lài Yīngzhào (Mandarin); Lōa Eng-chiàu (Taiwanese); Lai Yîn-cheu (Hakka) (1946– )	1 Oct 2007	18 Jul 2010	Resigned due to scandal in the Taiwan High Court.	Chen Shui-bian, Ma Ying-jeou
–		Hsieh Tsai-chuan 謝在全; Xiè Zàiquán (Mandarin); Chiā Chāi-choân (Taiwanese); Chhia Chhai-chhiòn (Hakka) ( – )	19 July 2010	12 Oct 2010	as acting	Ma Ying-jeou
3		Rai Hau-min 賴浩敏; Lài Yīngzhào (Mandarin); Lōa Hō-bín (Taiwanese); Lai Ho-men (Hakka) (1939– )	13 Oct 2010	31 Oct 2016		Ma Ying-jeou, Tsai Ing-wen
4		Hsu Tzong-li 許宗力; Xǔ Zōnglì (Mandarin); Khó͘ Chong-le̍k (Taiwanese); Hí Chûng-li̍t (Hakka) (1956– )	1 Nov 2016	1 Nov 2024		Tsai Ing-wen, Lai Ching-te
–		Shieh Ming-yan 謝銘洋; Xiè Míngyáng (Mandarin) (1957– )	1 Nov 2024	Incumbent	as acting	Lai Ching-te
