= Government of the Republic of China =

- Emblem
- Formation: 20 May 1948; 78 years ago
- Founding document: Constitution of the Republic of China
- Jurisdiction: Republic of China (Taiwan)
- Website: taiwan.gov.tw

Legislative branch
- Legislature: Legislative Yuan; Suspended: Control Yuan; National Assembly
- Meeting place: Legislative Yuan Building, Taipei

Executive branch
- Leader: Premier
- Appointer: nominated by the President
- Headquarters: Executive Yuan Building, Taipei
- Main organ: Executive Yuan
- Departments: 35

Judicial branch
- Court: Judicial Yuan
- Seat: Judicial Yuan Building, Taipei

Government of the Republic of China
- Traditional Chinese: 中華民國政府
- Simplified Chinese: 中华民国政府
Transcriptions
Standard Mandarin
- Hanyu Pinyin: Zhōnghuá Mínguó Zhèngfǔ
Hakka
- Pha̍k-fa-sṳ: Chûng-fà Mìn-koet Chṳn-fú
Southern Min
- Hokkien POJ: Tiong-hôa Bîn-kok Chèng-hú
- Tâi-lô: Tiong-huâ Bîn-kok Tsìng-hú
Eastern Min
- Fuzhou BUC: Dṳ̆ng-huà Mìng-guók Céng-hū

The Government of the Republic of China (Note: commonly known as the Government of Taiwan, or historically the Government of China when referring to the period before its retreat to Taiwan.) is the national authority whose actual-controlled territory consists of main island of Taiwan (Formosa), Penghu, Kinmen, Matsu, and other island groups, collectively known as the Taiwan Area or Free Area. A unitary state, the ROC government, under the current constitutional amendments, is run by a de facto semi-presidential system, consists of the presidency and five branches (Yuan; 院, literally "Government Agency"): the Executive Yuan, Legislative Yuan, Judicial Yuan, Examination Yuan, and Control Yuan. The president is the head of state, with the premier as the head of government, currently ruled by the Democratic Progressive Party (DPP) since 2016. Since the 2005 amendments of the Additional Articles of the Constitution, the Legislative Yuan has been the de facto unicameral parliamentary body of the country.

Originally established in 1912 in Nanjing, the Government of the Republic of China relocated several times before finally moving to Taipei, Taiwan, in 1949 because of its military losses in the Chinese Civil War. Up until the 1990s, the government has historically been dominated by the Kuomintang (KMT) under the one-party state Dang Guo authoritarian regime, before evolving into a multi-party democracy after martial law and the climate of White Terror gradually ended. This government was the internationally recognized official government of China until 1971 by the United Nations and until 1979 by the United States.

== Organizational structure ==
The government formally consists of the presidency and five branches of government, modeled on Sun Yat-sen's political philosophy of Three Principles of the People.

Office of the President		President	National Security Council
Executive Yuan	Legislative Yuan	Judicial Yuan	Examination Yuan	Control Yuan

In practice, the system resembles a semi-presidential system with a uniquely strong presidency, as the president may appoint the premier, the head of government, without the consent of the legislature. The president, however, shares limitations found in other semi-presidential systems, including the lack of a strong veto and no direct control of most administrative policy.

Category	Name		Role	Leader
Category	English	Chinese	Role	Leader
Presidency	President	總統	Head of state, Executive	Lai Ching‑te
Presidency	Vice President	副總統		Hsiao Bi-khim
Presidency	Office of the President	總統府	Advisory and administrative agencies to the President	Pan Men-an
Presidency	National Security Council	國家安全會議	Advisory and administrative agencies to the President	Joseph Wu
Five Yuans	Executive Yuan	行政院	Executive, Cabinet	Cho Jung-tai
Five Yuans	Legislative Yuan	立法院	Legislature, Parliament	Han Kuo-yu
Five Yuans	Judicial Yuan	司法院	Judiciary, Constitutional court	Shieh Ming-yan (acting)
Five Yuans	Examination Yuan	考試院	Civil service commission	Chou Hung-hsien
Five Yuans	Control Yuan	監察院	Auditory	Chen Chu

=== Presidency ===
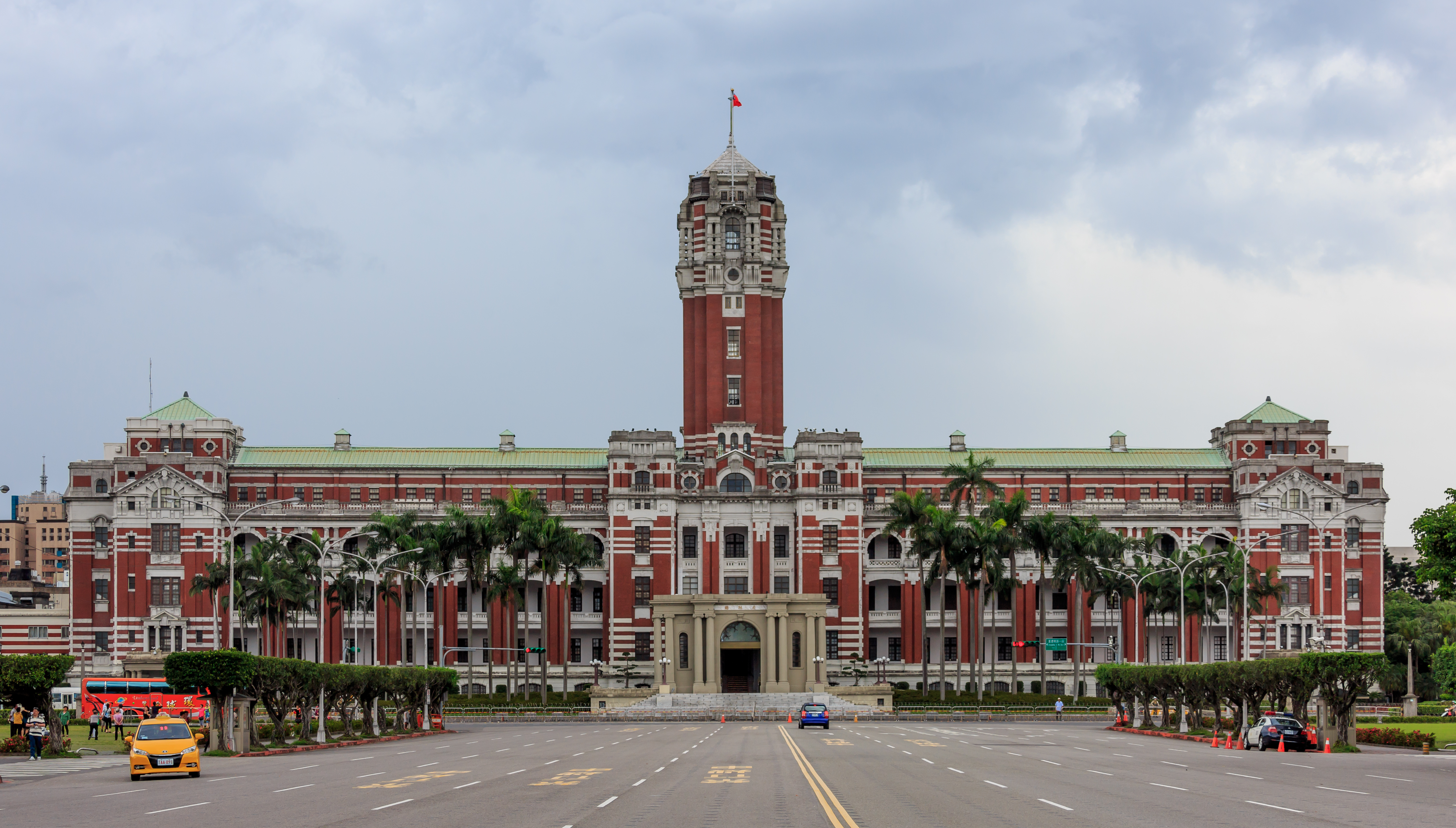
Presidential Office Building

The leadership of the country consists of the two top officials that is directly and jointly elected by citizens of the Republic of China residing in the Taiwan Area.

- President of the Republic of China
- Vice President of the Republic of China

Under the president, two advisory and administrative agencies are established to support the work of the president.

- Office of the President (Presidential Office)
  - Secretary-General of the Office of the President
- National Security Council
  - Secretary-General of the National Security Council

=== Executive Yuan ===
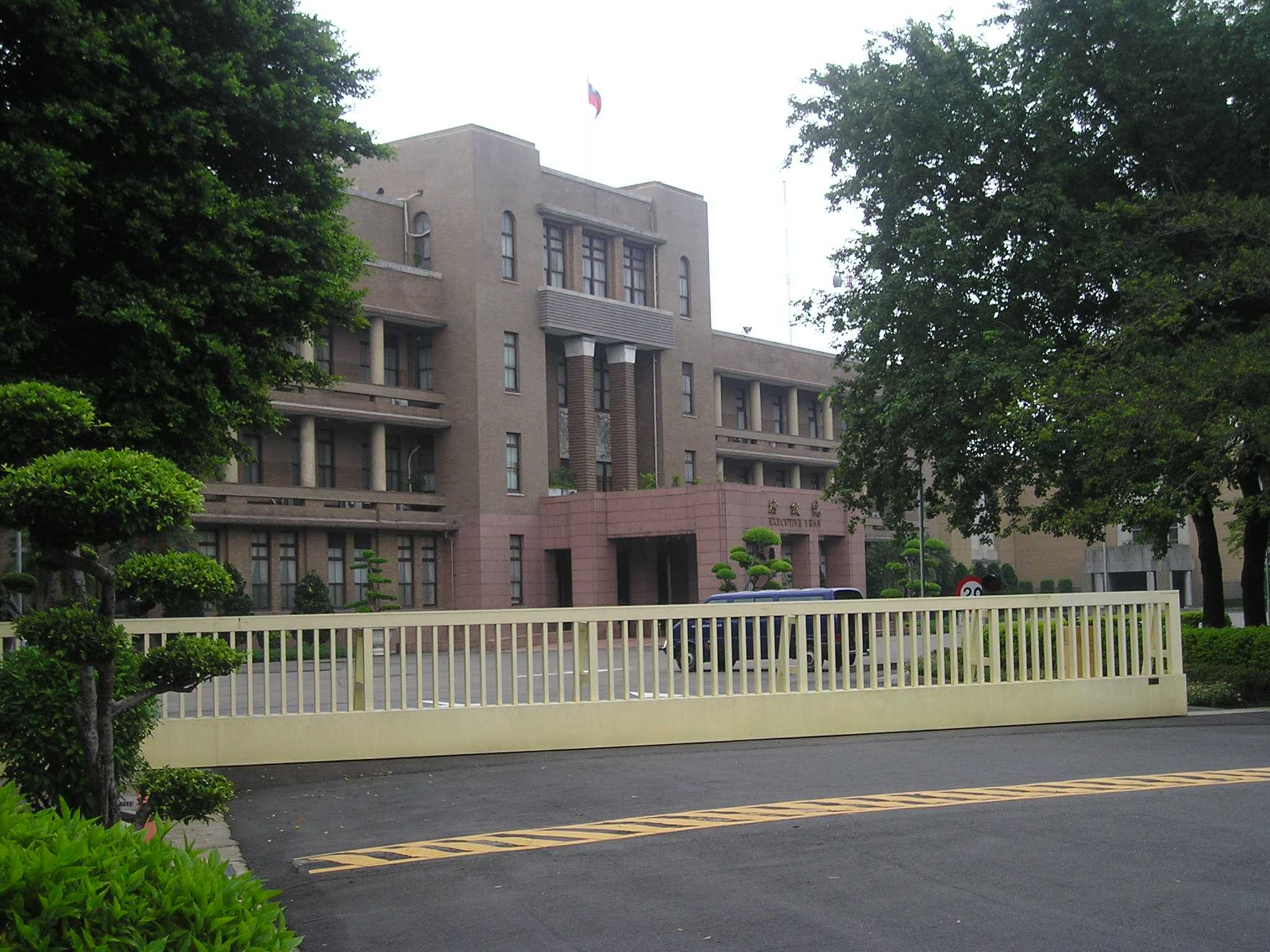
Executive Yuan

The Executive Yuan is led by the premier. However, the ROC's political system does not fit traditional models. The premier is selected by the president without the need for approval from the Legislature, but the Legislature can pass laws without regard for the president, as neither the president nor the premier wields veto power. Thus, there is little incentive for the president and the legislature to negotiate on legislation if they are of opposing parties. During the tenure of the pan-Green's Chen Shui-bian the continued control of the Legislative Yuan by the pan-Blue majority caused legislation to repeatedly stall, as the two sides were deadlocked. There is another curiosity of the ROC system; because the ROC was previously dominated by strongman one-party politics, real power in the system shifted from one position to another, depending on what position was currently occupied by the leader of the state (Chiang Kai-shek and later his son, Chiang Ching-kuo). This legacy has resulted in executive powers currently being concentrated in the office of the president rather than the premier.

=== Legislative Yuan ===
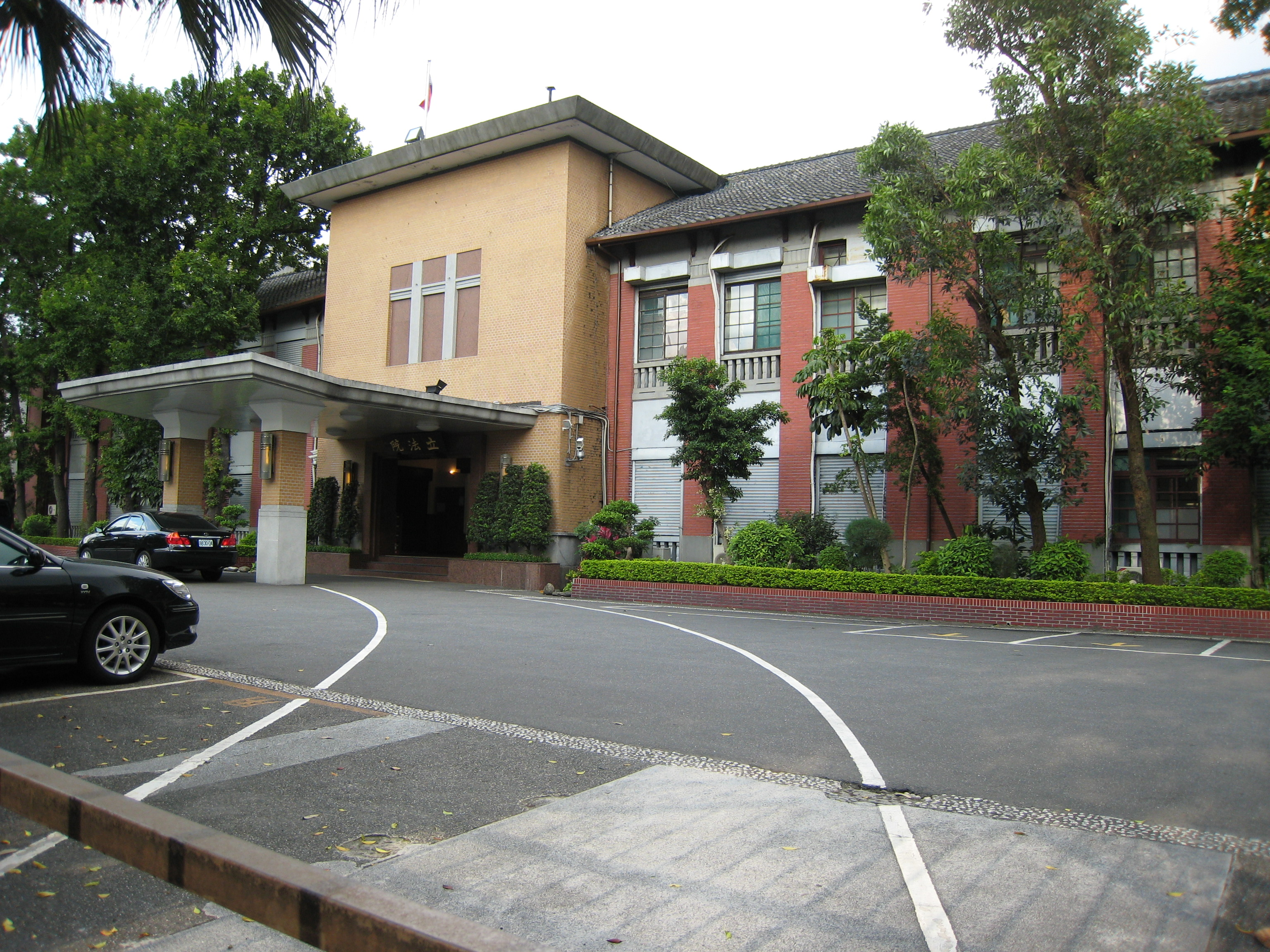
Legislative Yuan

The main legislative body is the unicameral Legislative Yuan with one hundred and thirteen seats. Seventy-three are elected in single member districts; thirty-four are elected based on the proportion of nationwide votes received by participating political parties, and six seats are reserved to represent aboriginal groups. Members serve four-year terms. Although sometimes referred to as a "parliament", the Legislative Yuan, under Sun's political theory, is a branch of government, while only the National Assembly of the Republic of China, which is now abolished, with the power to amend the constitution and formerly to elect the president and vice president, could be considered a parliament. However, after constitutional amendments effectively transferring almost all of the National Assembly's powers to the Legislative Yuan in the late 1990s, it has become more common for newspapers in Taiwan to refer to the Legislative Yuan as the nation's "parliament" (國會, guóhuì).

=== Judicial Yuan ===
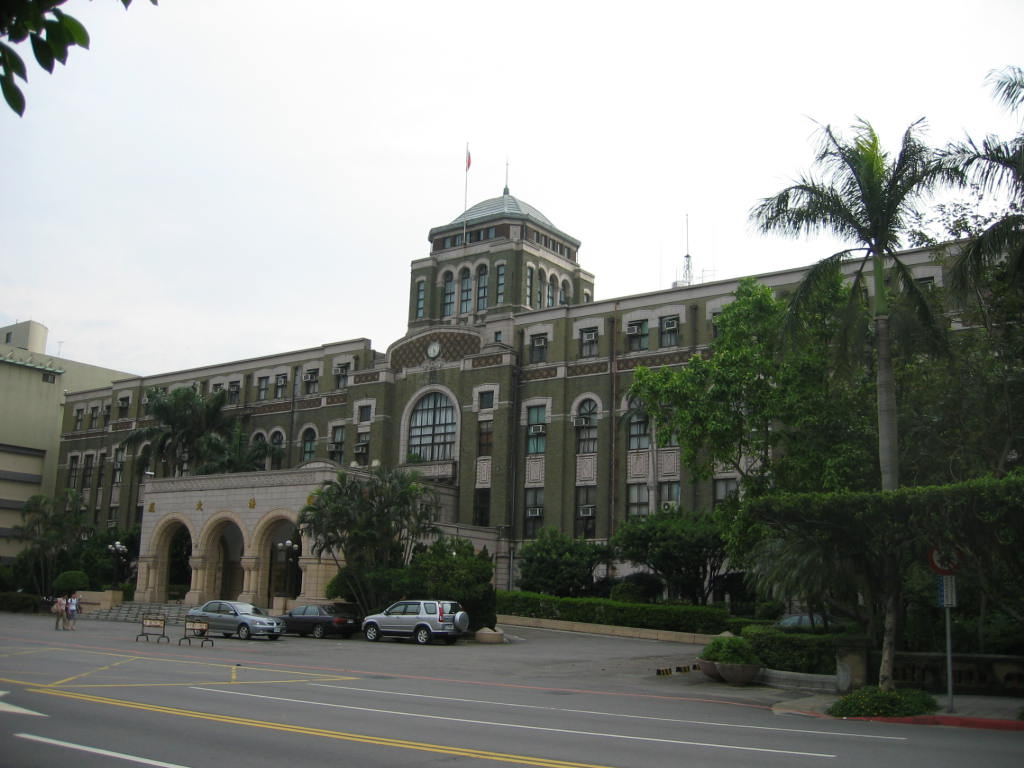
Judicial Yuan

The Judicial Yuan is the ROC's highest judiciary. The President and Vice-President of the Judicial Yuan and fifteen Justices form the Council of Grand Justices. They are nominated and appointed by the President of the Republic, with the consent of the Legislative Yuan. The highest court, the Supreme Court, consists of a number of civil and criminal divisions, each of which is formed by a presiding Judge and four Associate Judges, all appointed for life. In 1993, a separate constitutional court was established to resolve constitutional disputes, regulate the activities of political parties and accelerate the democratization process. There is no trial by jury but the right to a fair and public trial is protected by law and respected in practice; many cases are presided over by multiple judges.

Capital punishment is legal. Efforts have been made by the government to reduce the number of executions, although they have not been able to completely abolish the punishment. As of 2006, about 80% of Taiwanese want to keep the death penalty.

=== Examination Yuan ===
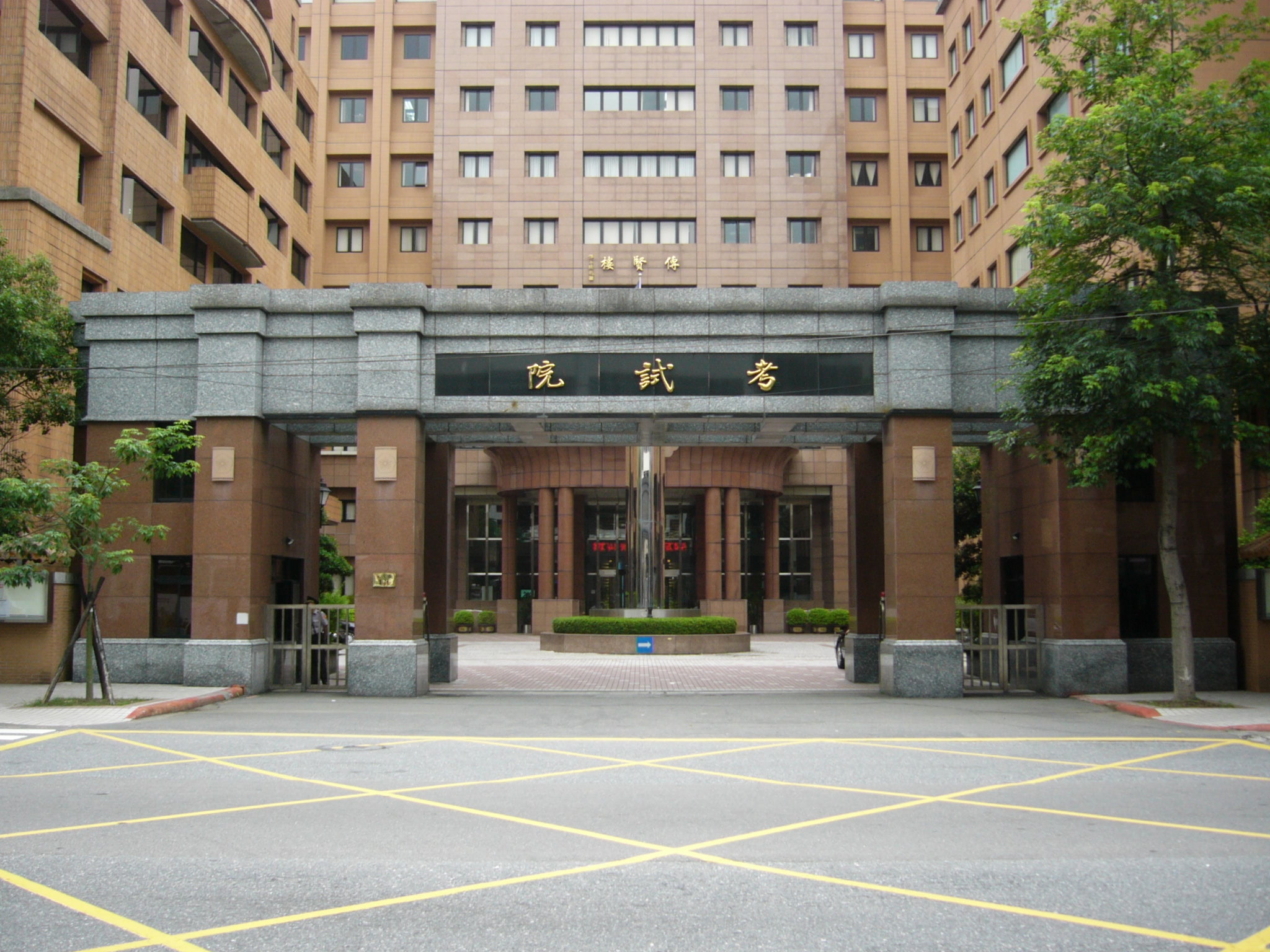
Examination Yuan

The Examination Yuan is in charge of validating the qualification of civil servants in the Republic of China. As a special branch of government under the Three Principles of the People. The concept of the Examination Yuan is based on the old Imperial examination system used in Imperial China.

=== Control Yuan ===
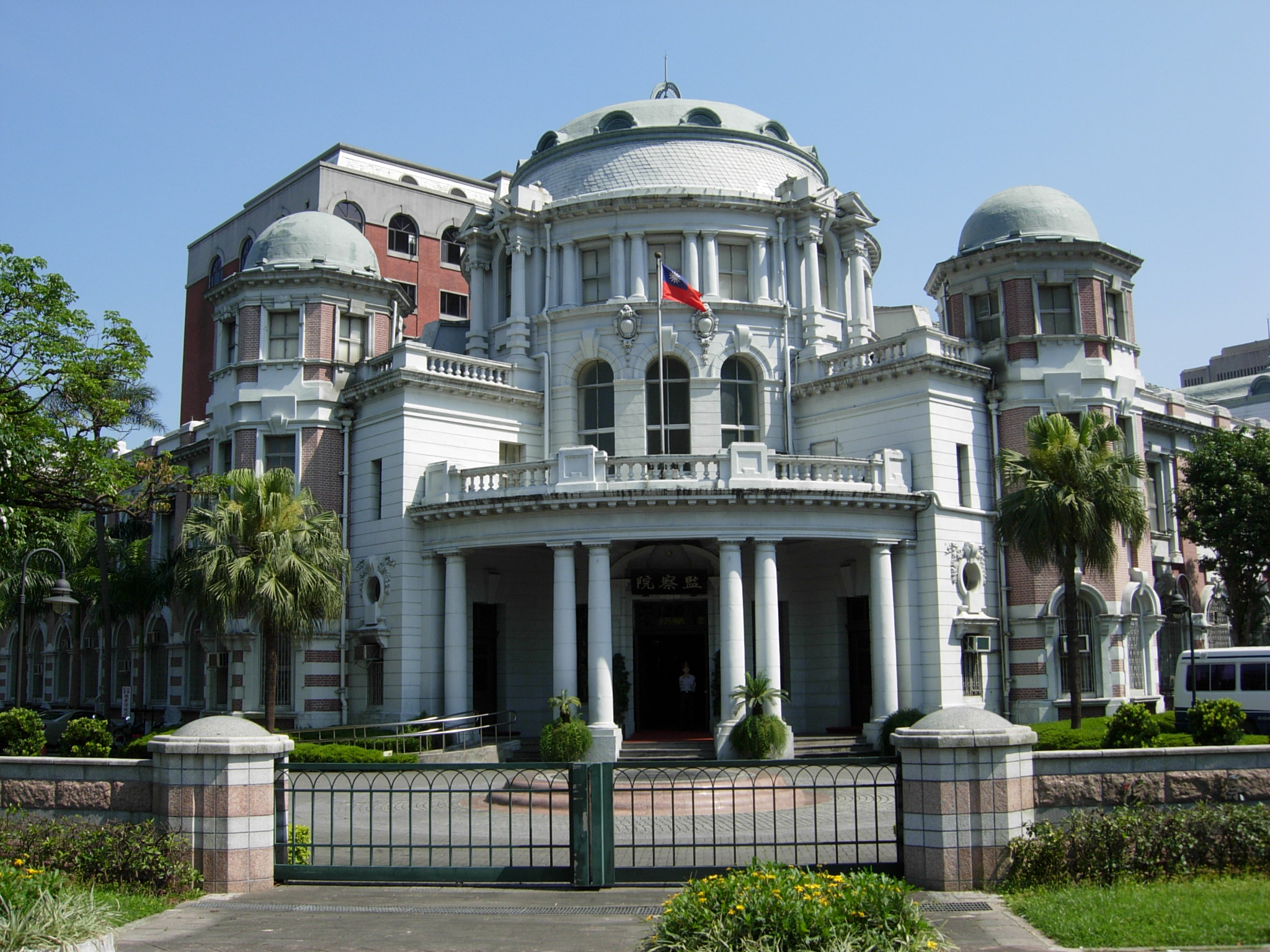
Control Yuan

Based on the traditional Chinese censorate, the Control Yuan is an investigatory agency that monitors the other branches of government. It may be compared to the Court of Auditors of the European Union, the Government Accountability Office of the United States, a political ombudsman, or a standing commission for administrative inquiry. Before the 1990s, it was the upper chamber of the tricameral parliament.

== History ==
The Government of the Republic of China was formally established in 1912 in Nanjing, with Sun Yat-sen as President of the Provisional Government of the Republic of China under the Provisional Constitution of the Republic of China. This government moved to Beijing in the same year with Yuan Shikai as president, and continued under his successors as the internationally recognized government of China until 1928. In the Republican period, there were a series of governments, sometimes in rivalry with each other. The Nationalist government, led by the Kuomintang (KMT), was originally formed as a rival military government under Sun Yat-sen in Guangzhou in 1917. After Sun's death in 1925, Chiang Kai-shek led the Northern Expedition (1926–1928) to unify the country and established the capital in Nanjing. This government gained diplomatic recognition but did not control all the territory of the Qing dynasty. The essentially one-party rule functioned under Sun's Three Principles of the People, which provided for a transitional period of "tutelage", but drew more political parties, including the Chinese Communist Party into a United Front during the Second Sino-Japanese War (1937–1945). The Tutelage Constitution of 1931 was replaced by the Constitution of the Republic of China in 1947.

=== 1912–1928: Beiyang government ===
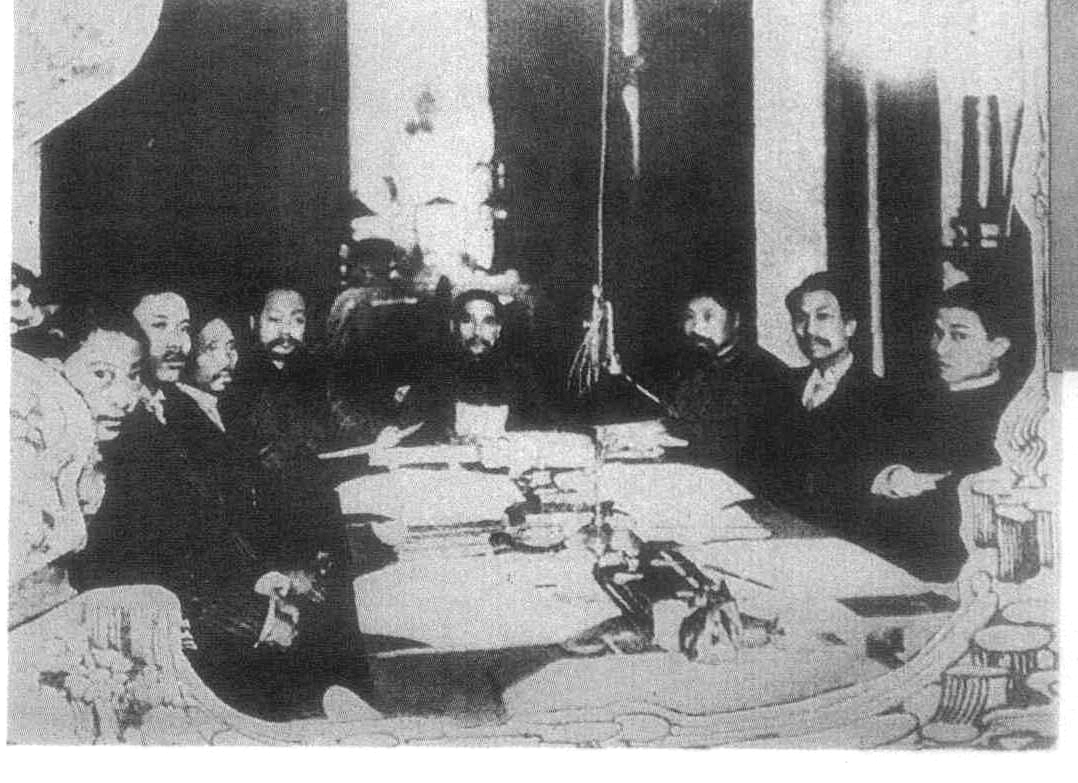
Cabinet meeting of the Nanjing Provisional Government led by Sun Yat-sen

The first Chinese national government was established on 1 January 1912, in Nanjing, with Sun Yat-sen as the provisional president. Provincial delegates were sent to confirm the authority of the national government, and they later also formed the first parliament. The power of this national government was limited and short-lived, with generals controlling both central and northern provinces of China. The limited acts passed by this government included the formal abdication of the Qing dynasty and some economic initiatives. The parliament's authority became nominal; violations of the Constitution by Yuan Shikai, who became president in March 1912, were met with half-hearted motions of censure, and Kuomintang members of the parliament who gave up their membership in the KMT were offered 1,000 British pounds. Yuan maintained power locally by sending military generals to be provincial governors or by obtaining the allegiance of those already in power.

When Yuan died, the parliament of 1913 was reconvened to give legitimacy to a new government. However, the real power of the time passed to military leaders, forming the warlord period. The impotent government still had its uses; when World War I began, several Western powers and Japan wanted China to declare war on Germany, in order to liquidate German holdings. Nevertheless, it was widely seen as weak and unstable.

There were also several warlord governments and puppet states sharing the same name. See also: Wang Jingwei Government, Warlord era, Chinese Soviet Republic.

=== 1928–1947: Nationalist government ===
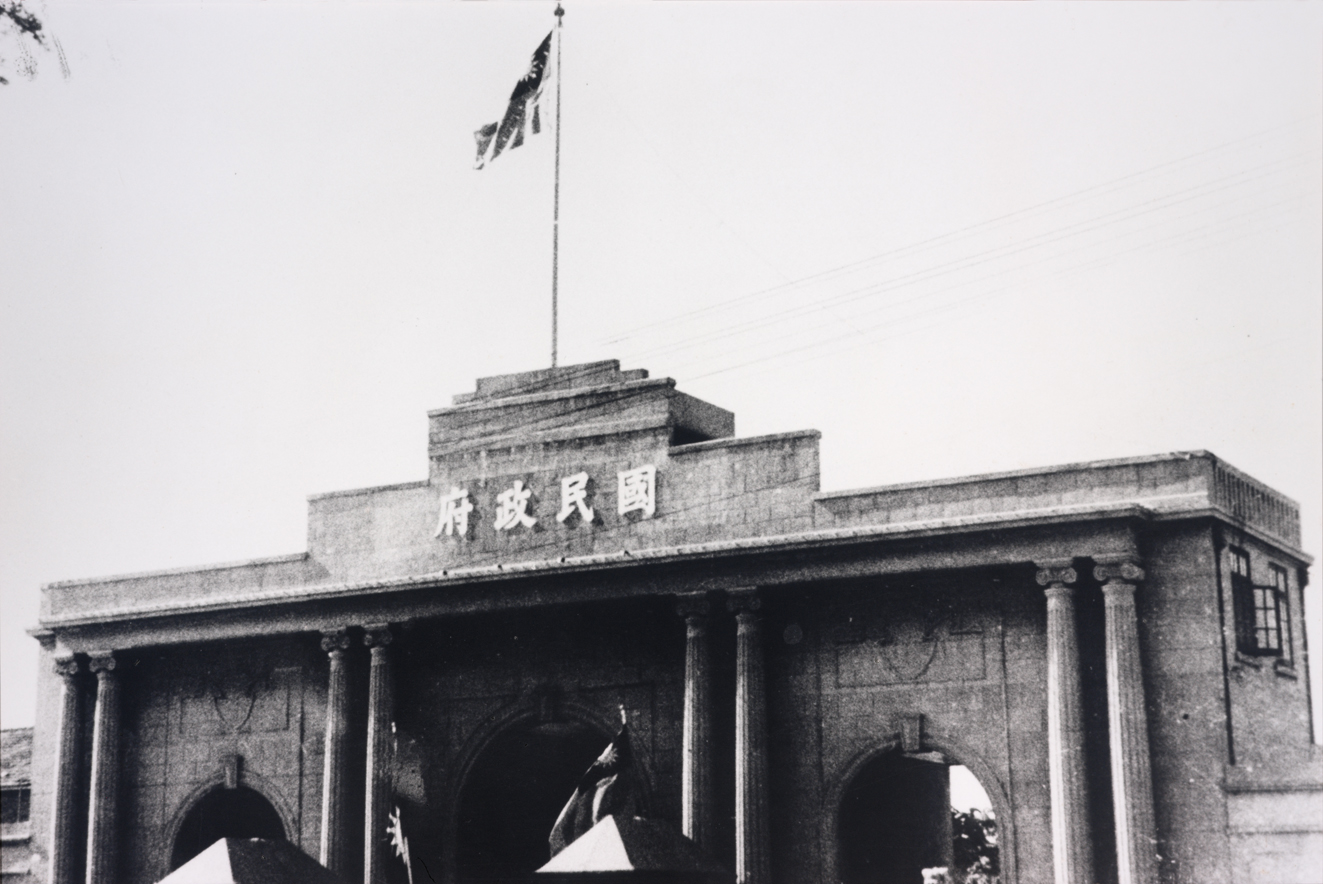
In 1927, National Government of the Republic of China at Nanjing

After the successful Northern Expedition led by the Kuomintang (KMT) and its leader Chiang Kai-shek, the KMT managed to unify China nominally and established the National Government of the Republic of China (also known as the Nationalist Government; traditional Chinese: 國民政府; simplified Chinese: 国民政府; pinyin: Guómín Zhèngfǔ) with its capital in Nanjing, whose authority was maintained till the full-scale outbreak of the Second Sino-Japanese War in 1937.

Known as the Nanjing Decade, the government ruled as a one-party state, as laid out by Sun Yat-sen's "Three Stages of Revolution" and his policy of Dang Guo (literally: party-state). The first stage was military unification, which was carried out with the Northern Expedition. The second was "political tutelage" which was a provisional government led by the KMT to educate people about their political and civil rights, and the third stage was constitutional government. The KMT considered themselves to be at the second stage in 1928. Although the Nanjing decade was far more stable and progressive as compared to the Warlord period which preceded it, it was still marred with widespread violence, official corruption and the ongoing civil war with the communists.

With the outbreak of the Second Sino-Japanese War, the invading Imperial Japanese Army managed to capture Nanjing on 13 December 1937. The Japanese then proceeded to sack the city, and massacred hundreds of thousands of Chinese civilians. With the fall of Nanjing, the government was forced to move first to Wuhan, until the city fell on 27 October 1938. It retreated further inland to Chongqing, which was the wartime capital until 1945. Although Chongqing was located in the inland western province of Sichuan, it was nevertheless heavily bombed by Japanese warplanes many times during the course of the war.

With the end of the war, the National Government moved back to Nanjing. The Kuomintang then proceeded with the drafting of a new constitution for China, which were boycotted by the communists. The Constitution of the Republic of China was adopted by the National Assembly on 25 December 1946 and went into force a year later. The constitution was seen as the third and final step in Sun Yat-sen's "Three Stages of Revolution" - constitutional government. From then on, the government was known simply as the Government of the Republic of China (traditional Chinese: 中華民國政府; simplified Chinese: 中华民国政府; pinyin: Zhōnghuá Mínguó Zhèngfǔ). Chiang Kai-shek was also elected as the 1st President of the Republic of China under the constitution by the National Assembly in 1948, with Li Zongren being elected as vice-president. Chiang and Li inaugurated at the Presidential Palace in Nanjing on 20 May 1948, formally marking the transition from political tutelage to constitutional government.

However, in 1946, the civil war with the communists led by Mao Zedong resumed despite mediation by the United States. Stretched and exhausted due to the long war with the Japanese, the Kuomintang-led government faced a disciplined and ever growing communist Red Army, which numbers grew in strength and was renamed as the People's Liberation Army (PLA) in 1946. Although government forces were numerically superior and were equipped with modern weapons, they eventually lost due to low morale, defections, poor discipline as well as popular discontent with the ROC government due to skyrocketing inflation, corruption and administrative incompetence. The constitution was also superseded by the Temporary Provisions Effective During the Period of Communist Rebellion, which were a series of temporary constitutional provisions mainly to increase the powers of the president and suspended the two-term limit. The temporary provisions were passed by the National Assembly on 10 May 1948. Under intense pressure to take responsibility for the government's bleak outlook during the course of the civil war, Chiang resigned as president on 21 January 1949. The presidency was passed on to Vice-President Li Zongren, who was however unable to govern effectively due to Chiang pulling the strings behind government as Director-General of the Kuomintang.

With the fall of Nanjing to the PLA in April 1949, the ROC government moved south to Guangzhou, and then to its wartime capital of Chongqing, and finally to Chengdu. Sensing that he would eventually lose the mainland to the communists, Chiang secretly started preparations to move the government to the island of Taiwan, which was placed under the ROC's control on 25 October 1945. Taiwan was seen as a safe haven for Chiang due to it being separated from the mainland by the 180 km or 110 mi-wide Taiwan Strait. During that period, more than two million civilians, military personnel and government officials left the mainland for Taiwan. Chiang then declared Taipei as the provisional capital of the Republic of China on 7 December 1949, and left Chengdu for Taipei by air three days later when the city fell to the communists.

=== 1947–present ===
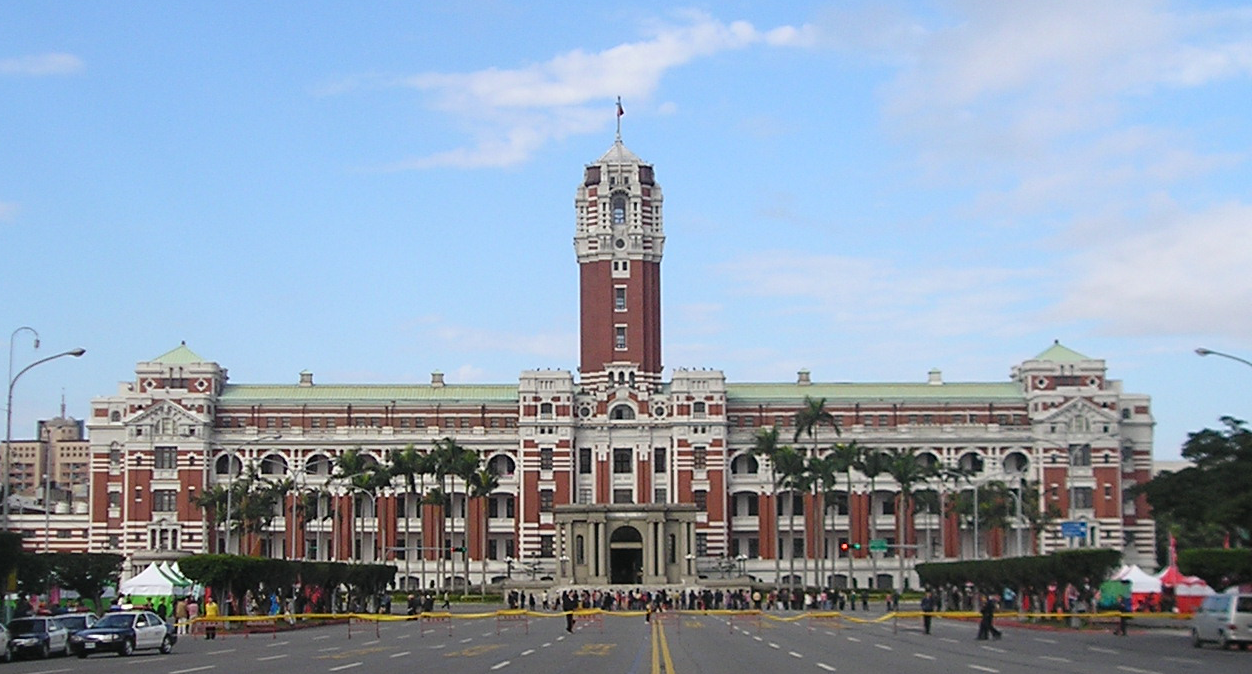
Since 1950, the Presidential Office Building in Taipei has been home to the Office of the President of the Republic of China

Based on the Constitution of the Republic of China, the head of state is the president, who is elected by popular vote for a four-year term on the same ticket as the vice-president. The president has authority over the five administrative branches (Yuan): the Control, Examination, Executive, Judicial, and Legislative Yuans. The president appoints the members of the Executive Yuan as the cabinet, including a premier, who is officially the president of the Executive Yuan; members are responsible for policy and administration.

Originally, the National Assembly of the Republic of China was elected in mainland China in 1947 to officially carry out the duties of choosing the president, to amend the constitution, and to exercise the sovereignty of the citizens, but in fact, the Assembly's role in Taipei seemed to reconfirm the executive powers of President Chiang Kai-shek. The National Assembly was re-established on Taiwan when the government moved. Because it was impossible to hold subsequent elections to represent constituencies in mainland China, representatives elected in 1947-48 held these seats "indefinitely." In June 1990, however, the Council of Grand Justices mandated the retirement, effective December 1991, of all remaining "indefinitely" elected members of the National Assembly, Legislative Yuan, and other bodies. In 2005, the National Assembly permanently abolished itself by ratifying a constitution amendment passed by the Legislative Yuan.

Amending the ROC constitution now requires the approval of three-fourths of the quorum of members of the Legislative Yuan. This quorum requires at least three-fourths of all members of the Legislature. After passing by the legislature, the amendment needs ratification in a referendum from at least fifty percent of all eligible voters of the ROC regardless of voter turnout.

== Notes ==
Previous: Nationalist government of the Republic of China	Government ruling Taiwan, Penghu, Kinmen, Matsu; 1947–present	Incumbent
Previous: Nationalist government of the Republic of China	Government ruling mainland China; 1947–1949	Next: Central People's Government of the People's Republic of China; 1949–1954
Previous: Nationalist government of the Republic of China	Representative for China in the United Nations; 1947–1971	Next: Government of the People's Republic of China; 1971–present
