= Tien Chung-chin =

- 田炯錦
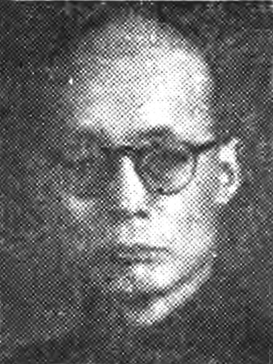
- Tien as a member of the Constituent National Assembly (1946)

President of the Judicial Yuan
- In office 1 December 1971 – 30 March 1977
- Vice President: Xie Yingzhou; Tai Yen-hui
- Preceded by: Xie Guansheng
- Succeeded by: Tai Yen-hui

Minister of the Interior
- In office 27 March 1958 – 31 May 1960
- Preceded by: Wang Depu
- Succeeded by: Lien Chen-tung

Minister of the Mongolian and Tibetan Affairs Commission
- In office 30 May 1960 – 14 December 1963
- Preceded by: Lee Yung-hsin
- Succeeded by: Kuo Chi-chiao
- In office 22 February 1951 – 25 May 1954
- Preceded by: Yu Ching-tang
- Succeeded by: Liu Lianke

Minister of Examination
- In office 13 July 1948 – May 1950
- Preceded by: Office established
- Succeeded by: Ma Kuo-lin (acting); Shih Shang-kuan

Personal details
- Born: 1899 Qingcheng County, China
- Died: 30 March 1977 (aged 77–78) Taipei, Taiwan
- Party: Kuomintang
- Education: Peking University (BS); University of Illinois (MS, PhD)

Tien Chung-chin (Chinese: 田炯錦; 1899–1977) was a Chinese-born politician. His political career began in China, with an appointment to the Control Yuan in 1931. He was subsequently elected to the National Constituent Assembly in 1946, and became the Minister of Examination in 1948. Tien retained the role as the government of the Republic of China retreated to Taiwan, serving until 1950. He took office as minister of the Mongolian and Tibetan Affairs Commission for the first time in 1951 and remained until 1954. He subsequently served as Minister of the Interior from 1958 to 1960, then returned to the Mongolian and Tibetan Affairs Commission until 1963. He died in office as President of the Judicial Yuan in 1977, having held the position since 1971.

== Career ==
Tien Chung-chin was born in 1899 and known by the courtesy name Yunching (Chinese: 雲青). A native of Qingcheng County, he attended Peking University, where he participated in the May Fourth Movement. Soon after graduation in 1923, Tien began advanced study in the United States. Starting in 1925, Tien enrolled in the University of Washington, then transferred to the University of Missouri before earning a master's and doctoral degree from the University of Illinois. Tien returned to China in 1930, joining the faculty of Northeastern University. In February 1931, Tien was appointed to the Control Yuan. In January 1936, he was named the leader of the Gansu Provincial Department of Education. After the Xi'an Incident, Tien was named chairman of the Shaanxi Provincial Government. He began a second term on the Control Yuan in 1938. Concurrently, Tien also served as president of Lanzhou University. In November 1946, he was elected to the National Constituent Assembly. Tien also retained his Control Yuan position, which included oversight of Gansu and Shaanxi. On 13 July 1948, Tien took office as the inaugural Minister of Examination.

Tien left for Taiwan in 1949. From 1951 to 1954, he led the Mongolian and Tibetan Affairs Commission. In 1958, Tien succeeded Wang Depu as interior minister. Upon stepping down from the ministry of the interior in 1960, Tien served on the Mongolian and Tibetan Affairs Commission for a second time, until 1963. In 1971, he was nominated to succeed Xie Guansheng as President of the Judicial Yuan. Tien held the office until his death in Taipei on 30 March 1977.
