= Hsu Tzong-li =

Chief Justice of Taiwan from 2016 to 2024

The Honourable Chief Justice Hsu Tzong-li
- 許宗力
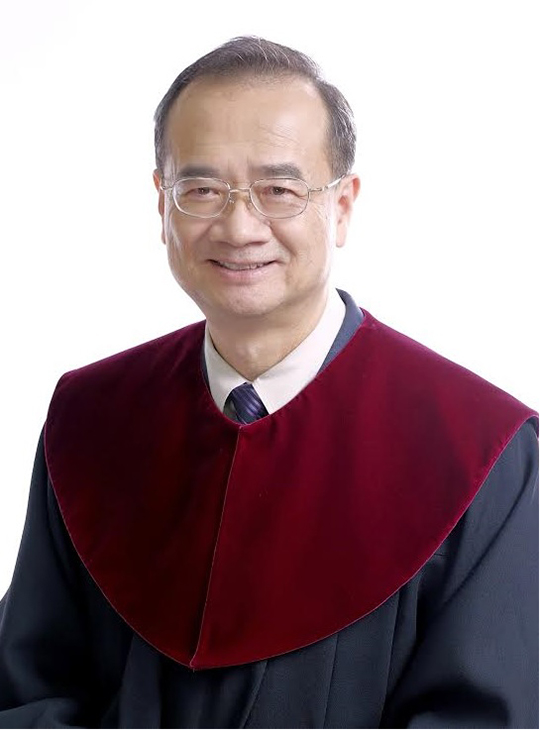
- Official portrait, 2018

11th President of the Judicial Yuan
- In office 1 November 2016 – 1 November 2024
- Appointed by: Tsai Ing-wen
- Vice President: Tsai Jeong-duen
- Preceded by: Rai Hau-min
- Succeeded by: Shieh Ming-yan (acting)

Associate Justice of the Judicial Yuan
- In office 1 November 2016 – 1 November 2024
- Appointed by: Tsai Ing-wen
- In office 1 October 2003 – 30 September 2011
- Appointed by: Chen Shui-bian

Personal details
- Born: 10 February 1956 (age 70) Chiayi, Taiwan
- Party: Independent
- Education: National Taiwan University (LLB); University of Göttingen (PhD)

Chinese name
- Traditional Chinese: 許宗力
- Hanyu Pinyin: Xǔ Zōnglì
- Hokkien POJ: Khó͘ Chong-le̍k
- Tâi-lô: Khóo Tsong-li̍k

Hsu Tzong-li (Chinese: 許宗力; pinyin: Xǔ Zōnglì; Pe̍h-ōe-jī: Khó͘ Chong-le̍k; born 10 February 1956) is a Taiwanese jurist who served as the Chief Justice (President of the Judicial Yuan) of Taiwan from 2016 to 2024.

== Academic career ==
Hsu graduated from National Taiwan University with an LL.B. and completed doctoral studies in Germany, where he earned his Ph.D. (Dr.iur.) in law from the University of Göttingen in 1986. Later that year, he began teaching law at Fu Jen Catholic University and moved to NTU in 1987. He was elected dean of NTU's law school in 2002.

== Legal career ==
He was a member of the Fair Trade Commission from 1995 to 1998 and led the Taiwan Law Society from 2001 to 2003.

=== Judicial Yuan ===
Hsu was named a member of the Judicial Yuan in 2003 and left the bench in 2011.

==== As president ====
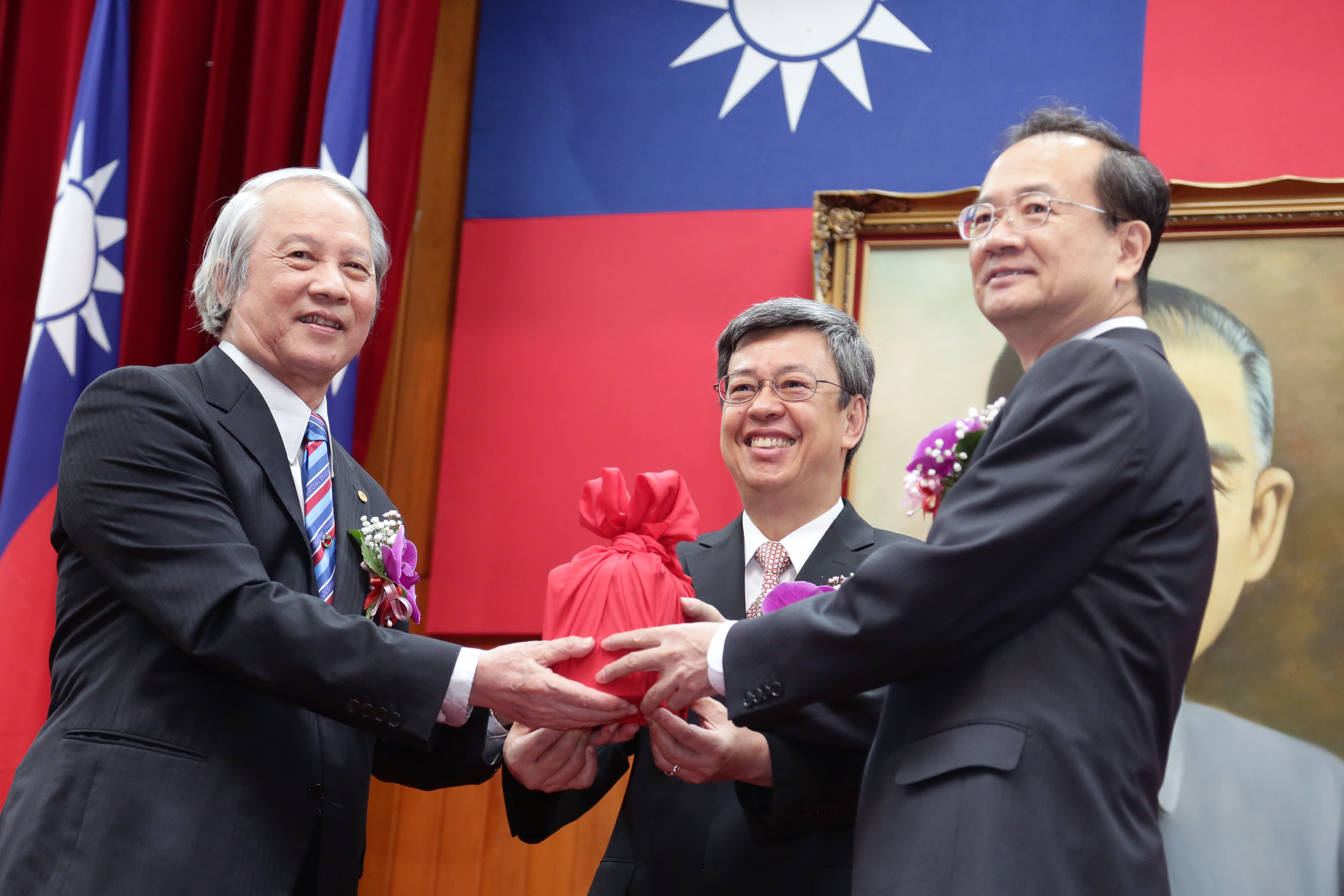
The appointment of Hsu to be the President of Judicial Yuan from outgoing President Rai Hau-min.

Hsu was appointed the President of the Judicial Yuan on 25 October 2016 after his nomination was approved by legislators after a week of questioning. His selection was challenged with allegations of unconstitutionality, as Hsu had previously served on the Judicial Yuan. Article V of the Additional Articles of the Constitution governs judicial appointments, and reads, in part "Each grand justice of the Judicial Yuan shall serve a term of eight years, independent of the order of appointment to office, and shall not serve consecutive terms." The Tsai Ing-wen administration argued that Hsu was reappointed, and never served consecutive terms. The Alliance for Civic Oversight of Supreme Court Justice Nominees approved of Hsu's selection, as did the New Power Party. Subsequently, the Legislative Yuan voted 72-2 for him to assume the post and for Tsai Jeong-duen to be the Vice President. Hsu was inaugurated as the President of the Judicial Yuan on 1 November 2016 in a ceremony attended by Vice President Chen Chien-jen. Hsu appointed Lu Tai-lang (Chinese: 呂太郎) the secretary-general of the Judicial Yuan and Chou Chan-chun (Chinese: 周占春) as the head of the Judges Academy.

== Political stances ==
Hsu stated shortly before his confirmation as President of the Judicial Yuan in October 2016 that Cross-Strait relations should be handled on a special state-to-state basis, comparing them to relations between East and West Germany.

Legal offices
Preceded by Rai Hau-min	President of the Judicial Yuan; 2016-	Succeeded by Incumbent
