= Tsai Tsai-chen =

Taiwanese judge (born 1957)

- 蔡彩貞
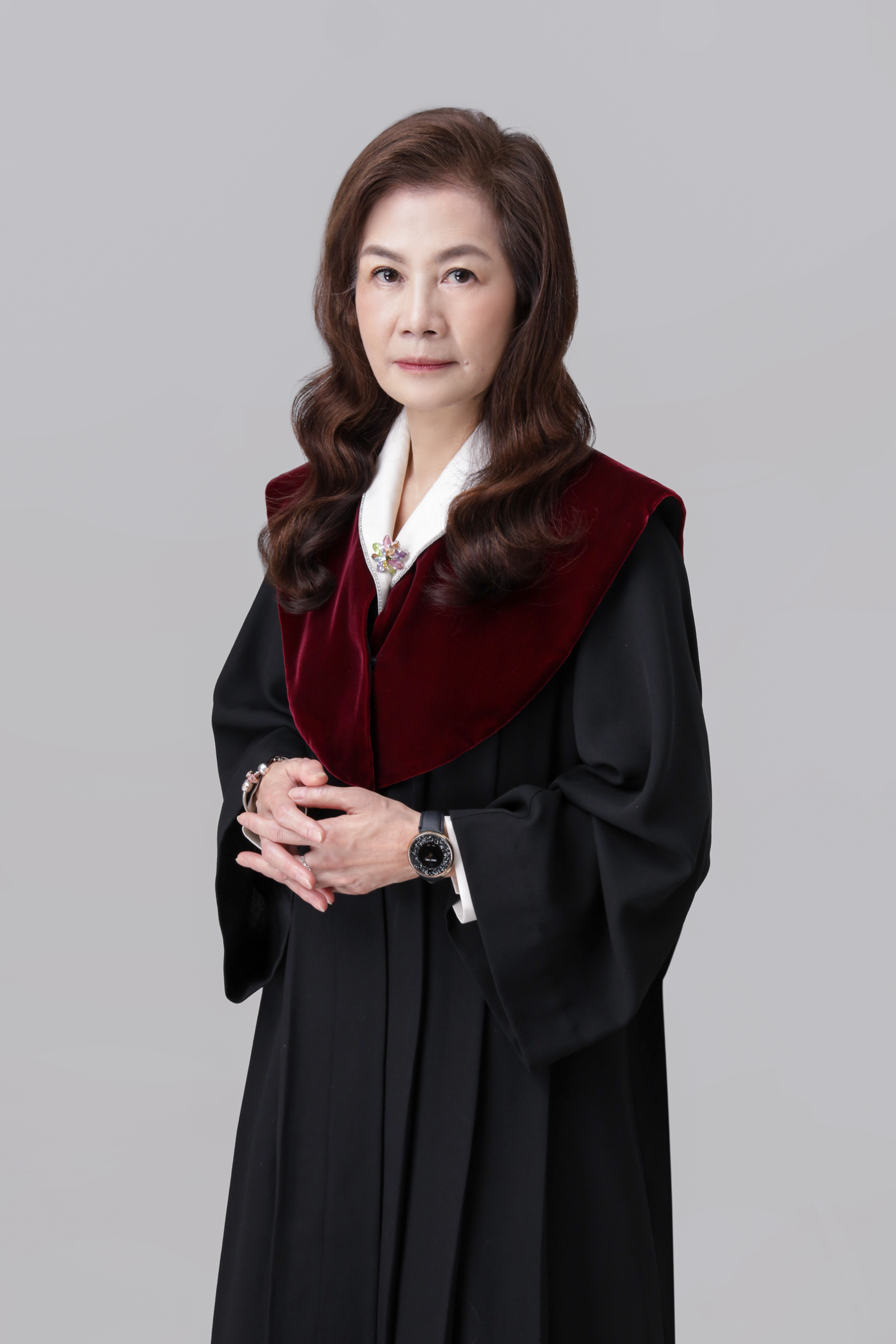
- Official portrait, 2023

Justice of the Judicial Yuan
- Incumbent
- Assumed office 1 October 2023
- President: Tsai Ing-wen; Lai Ching-te

Personal details
- Born: 1957 (age 68–69)
- Education: National Taiwan University (LLB, MBA)

Tsai Tsai-chen (Chinese: 蔡彩貞; pinyin: Cài Cǎizhēn; born 1957) is a Taiwanese judge who has served as Grand Justice of the Judicial Yuan since 2023. She previously served at the Supreme Court of Taiwan between 2005 and 2014 and again between 2020 and 2023.

== Career ==
Tsai was born in 1957. She attended law school at National Taiwan University, graduating with an LL.B., and passed the advanced financial examination and the judges examination in 1981. She also earned a Master of Business Administration (M.B.A.) from National Taiwan University.

Between the 1980s and the 1990s, she served as district judge in Tainan, Taipei and Hsinchu. Tsai served twice at the High Court, first between 1999 and 2002, and later between 2008 and 2009. In 2002, she was appointed deputy director general of the Criminal Department of the Judicial Yuan, an office she held until 2005 when was appointed to the Supreme Court of Taiwan. When the Supreme Court abolished the "secret case assignment" system in 2012, she expressed her opposition, believing that making the presiding judge public would make it easier for powerful people to exert pressure, which would not be conducive to fair trials.

She left the Supreme Court in 2014 when she was appointed director general of the Criminal Department of the Judicial Yuan, an office she held for two years.

Tsai became judge president of the Taiwan Shilin District Court between 2016 and 2020. She returned to the Supreme Court in 2020.

On 30 May 2023, Tsai was announced as a proposal by the Judicial Yuan as a new Grand Justice. The Legislative Yuan approved her nomination on 21 June. She was sworn in on 1 October.
