= Shieh Ming-yan =

Taiwanese legal academic and judge

- 謝銘洋
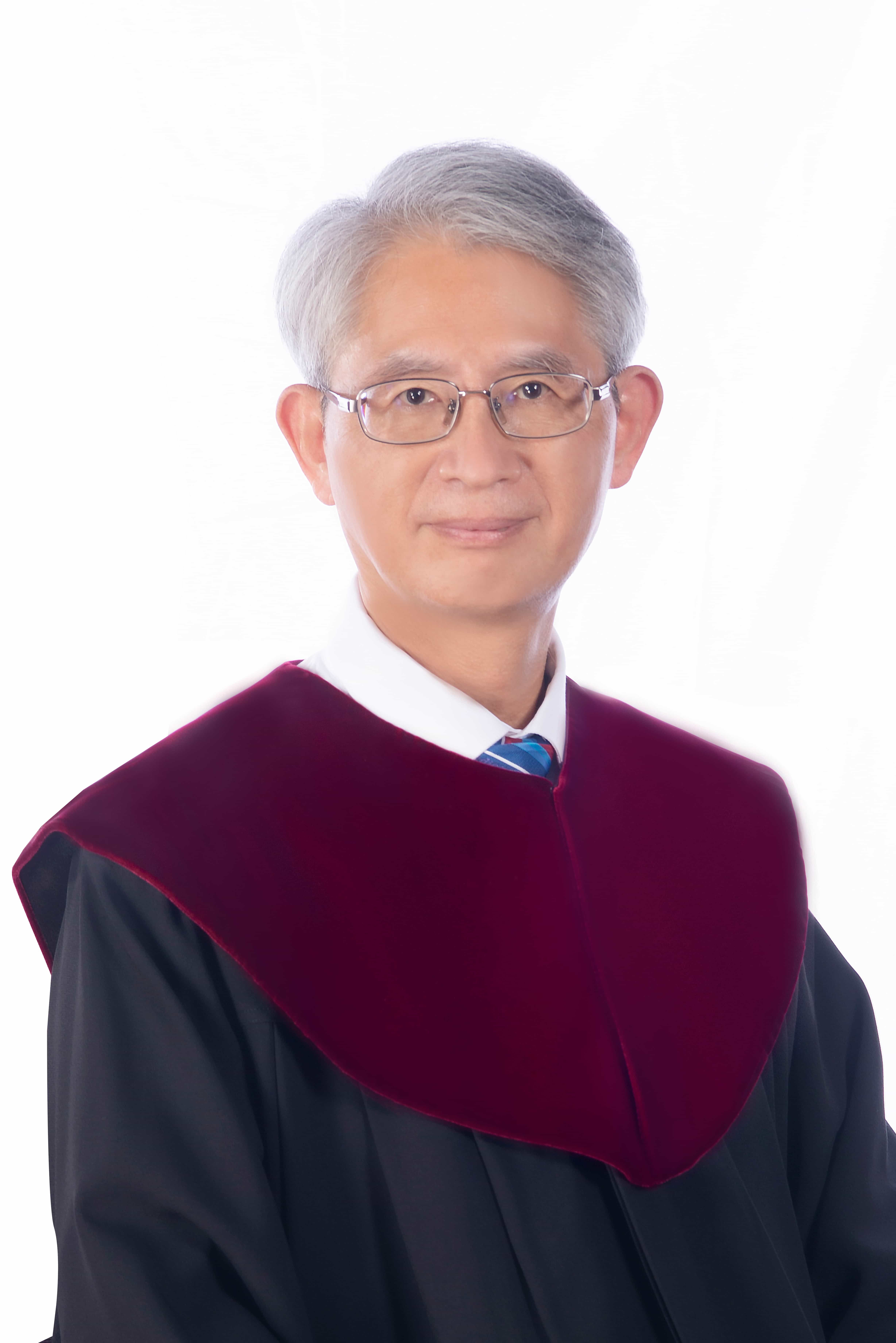
- Official portrait, 2023

President of the Judicial Yuan
- Acting
- Assumed office 1 November 2024
- President: Lai Ching-te
- Preceded by: Hsu Tzong-li

Grand Justice of the Judicial Yuan
- Incumbent
- Assumed office 1 October 2019
- Appointed by: Tsai Ing-wen

Personal details
- Born: 1957 (age 68–69)
- Education: National Taiwan University (LLB, LLM); LMU Munich (PhD)

Shieh Ming-yan (Chinese: 謝銘洋; pinyin: Xiè Míngyáng; born 1957) is a Taiwanese jurist who has served a justice of the Judicial Yuan since 2019, and as acting president of the Judicial Yuan since 2024. He is a professor of law at National Taiwan University and was previously the dean of its College of Law.

== Education ==
Shieh graduated from National Taiwan University with an LL.B. in 1980 and an LL.M. in 1985. He then completed doctoral studies in Germany and earned his Ph.D. (Dr. jur.) degree in law from LMU Munich in 1990. His doctoral dissertation, written in German, was titled, "Kündigung aus wichtigem Grund und Wegfall der Geschäftsgrundlage bei Patentlizenz- und Urheberrechtsverträgen".

== Career ==
From 1980 to 1983, Shieh worked as a lawyer. He was a visiting scholar to LMU Munich from 1996 to 1997, Columbia University in 2007, and Fordham University in 2009. He has been a law professor at National Taiwan University since 1990, and was dean of the College of Law from 2012 to 2015. He was chair of the Taiwan Law Society from 2017 to 2018.

Shortly after the Cross-Strait Service Trade Agreement (CSSTA) was signed in June 2013, Shieh signed a petition urging its renegotiation. In April 2014, Shieh lent support to another petition asking the Taipei District Prosecutors’ Office to look into the removal from the Legislative Yuan of students participating in the Sunflower Student Movement protests over the CSSTA. He was critical of the government's response to protesters, stating that the NTU College of Law "truly failed our students, because we have not taught [President] Ma Ying-jeou well."

In May 2019, Ma's successor Tsai Ing-wen nominated Shieh to serve on the Constitutional Court (then known as the Council of Grand Justices). The Legislative Yuan voted to approve Shieh's nomination in June 2019. Lai Ching-te named Shieh acting president of the Judicial Yuan on 1 November 2024, as confirmation hearings for Judicial Yuan positions, including replacements for president Hsu Tzong-li and vice president Tsai Jeong-duen were delayed. The ruling and opposition parties have been unable to confirm judicial nominees due to disagreements on the budget and other appointments.
