= Su Yeong-chin =

Politician from Taiwan

- 蘇永欽
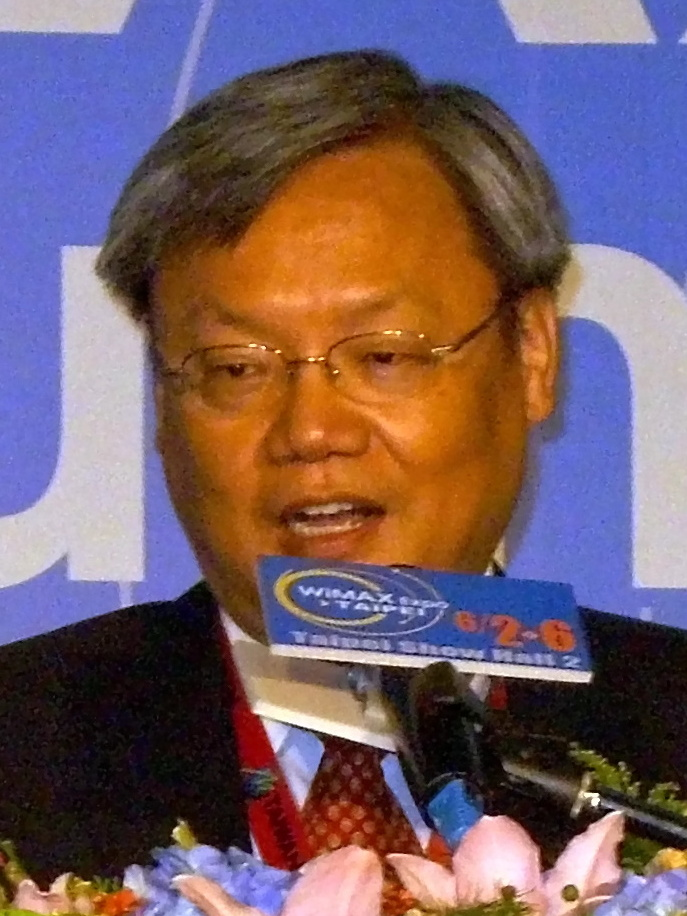

Vice President of the Judicial Yuan
- In office 13 October 2010 – 30 September 2016
- President: Rai Hau-min
- Preceded by: Hsieh Tsai-chuan
- Succeeded by: Tsai Jeong-duen

Chairperson of National Communications Commission of the Executive Yuan
- In office 22 February 2006 – 31 July 2008
- Deputy: Howard S.H. Shyr, Liou Tzong-der
- Preceded by: Position established
- Succeeded by: Bonnie Peng

Vice Chairperson of Fair Trade Commission of the Republic of China
- In office 1996–1998
- Chairperson: Chao Yang-ching

Personal details
- Born: 28 March 1951 (age 75) Yilan County, Taiwan
- Party: Kuomintang
- Relations: Su Chi (brother)
- Education: National Taiwan University (LLB); LMU Munich (LLD)

Su Yeong-chin (traditional Chinese: 蘇永欽; simplified Chinese: 苏永钦; pinyin: Sū Yǒngqīn) is a Taiwanese jurist and judge. He served as the Vice President of the Judicial Yuan from 13 October 2010 to 30 September 2016.

== Education ==
Su graduated from National Taiwan University with a Bachelor of Laws (LL.B.) in 1972, then completed doctoral studies in Germany, where he earned his Doctor of Laws (LL.D.) from LMU Munich in 1981 with a specialization in commercial law. His doctoral dissertation was titled, "Möglichkeiten und Grenzen gesetzgeberischer Maßnahmen zu Problemen der Marktwirtschaft in Nationalchina: mit Idealtypenbildung anhand von rechtsvergleichenden Untersuchungen".

== Early career ==
Su was an associate professor in 1981-1988 and professor in 1988–2010 at National Chengchi University (NCCU). He had also been the dean of the college of law of NCCU in 1996–1997.

== Personal life ==
Su Yeong-chin is the younger brother of Su Chi.
