= Su Chi =

Taiwanese political scientist and politician

- 蘇起
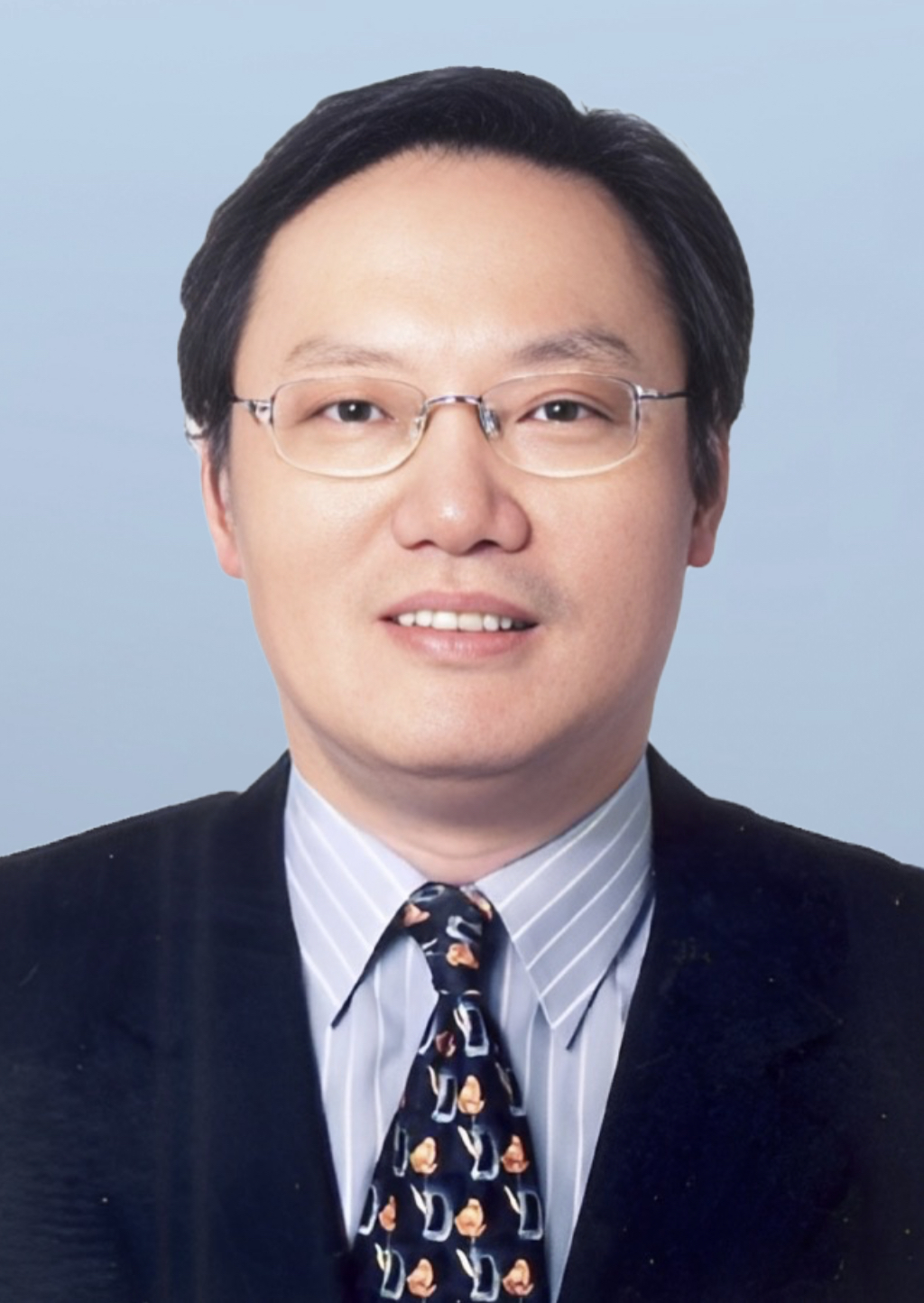
- Official portrait, 2005

Secretary-General of the National Security Council
- In office 20 May 2008 – 23 February 2010
- Preceded by: Mark Chen; Chen Chung-hsin (acting)
- Succeeded by: Hu Wei-jen

Member of the Legislative Yuan
- In office 1 February 2005 – 31 January 2008

Minister of the Mainland Affairs Council
- In office 1 February 1999 – 19 May 2000
- Preceded by: Chang King-yuh
- Succeeded by: Tsai Ing-wen

Minister of the Government Information Office
- In office 10 June 1996 – 15 May 1997
- Vice: David Lee
- Preceded by: Jason Hu
- Succeeded by: David Lee

Personal details
- Born: 1 October 1949 (age 77) Taichung, Taiwan
- Party: Kuomintang
- Education: National Chengchi University (BA); Johns Hopkins University (MA); Columbia University (MA, PhD)

Su Chi (Chinese: 蘇起; pinyin: Sū Qǐ; born 1 October 1949) is a Taiwanese political scientist and politician. He was the secretary-general of the National Security Council from 2008 to 2010. Previously, he was a member of the Legislative Yuan from 2005 to 2008, the minister of the Mainland Affairs Council from 1999 to 2000, and the minister of the Government Information Office from 1996 to 1997.

Su coined the phrase 1992 Consensus in early 2000 to describe the position on One China issues that developed following the October–November 1992 discussions between the Strait Exchange Foundation (SEF) and the Association for Relations Across the Taiwan Straits (ARATS).

== Early life and education ==
Su Chi was born Su Yongxin (蘇永鑫) on 1 October 1949 in Taichung, Taiwan. His parents were Su Zhanwu (蘇展武) and Ni Guoying (倪幗英). His mother had migrated to Taiwan while pregnant during the Great Retreat in 1949. His younger brother, Su Yeong-chin, became a legal scholar and served as chairman of Taiwan's National Communications Commission.

Su attended Weidao Middle School before graduating from Taipei Municipal Jianguo High School. He then enrolled at National Chengchi University, where he studied diplomacy. His undergraduate classmates there included future Taichung mayor Jason Hu. He graduated with his Bachelor of Arts in diplomacy in 1971. He then earned a master's degree from Johns Hopkins University in 1975.

Su completed his doctoral studies at Columbia University, where he earned a Master of Arts in Russian studies in 1980 and his Ph.D. in political science in 1984. His doctoral dissertation was titled, Soviet Image of and Policy Toward China, 1969–1979. During his time in the United States, Su also worked as a translator and editor for the New York-based Chinese-language newspaper World Journal. After receiving his doctorate, he completed postdoctoral research at Harvard University. He spent approximately one year conducting research at Harvard's Center for Science and International Affairs before returning to Taiwan.

== Mainland China visit ==
=== 2005 ===
In 2005, Su accompanied Kuomintang Chairperson Lien Chan to visit Nanjing in Jiangsu to meet with the high officials of Chinese Communist Party (CCP).

=== 2013 ===
In June 2013, Su and delegates led by Kuomintang (KMT) Honorary Chairman Wu Po-hsiung visited China and met with CCP general secretary Xi Jinping. The delegation included KMT Vice Chairpersons Hung Hsiu-chu and Huang Min-hui. This was his first visit to China after he left the National Security Council (NSC), citing that the ROC law prohibits him to visit China at least three years after he had left his NSC post.

== Personal life ==
Su Chi's younger brother is Su Yeong-chin.
