= Chu Cheng (politician) =

Chinese politician (1876–1951)

Chu Cheng Chu Chueh-sheng
- 居正
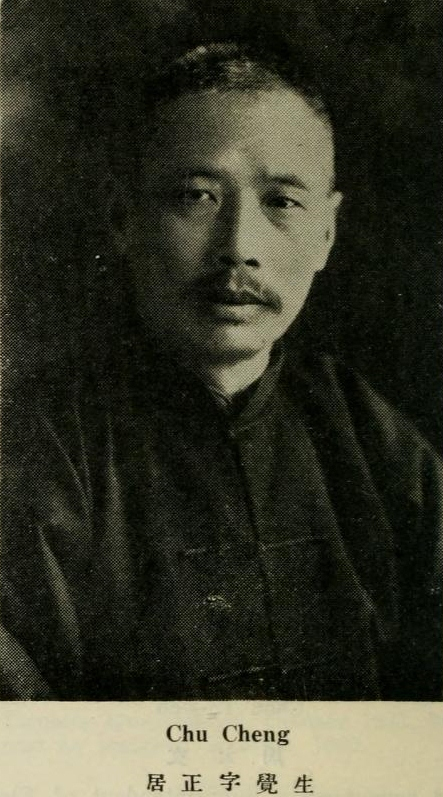

President of the Judicial Yuan
- In office March 1932 – 1 July 1948
- President: Lin Sen; Chiang Kai-shek
- Preceded by: Wu Chaoshu
- Succeeded by: Wang Ch'ung-hui

Personal details
- Born: November 8, 1876 Huangzhou, Hubei, Qing dynasty
- Died: November 23, 1951 (aged 75) Taipei, Taiwan
- Party: Kuomintang

Chinese name
- Chinese: 居正
Transcriptions
Standard Mandarin
- Hanyu Pinyin: Jū Zhèng
- Wade–Giles: Chü^{1} Cheng^{4}

Chu Cheng (Wade–Giles: Chü^{1} Cheng^{4}, also romanized as Ju Zheng in Hanyu Pinyin; November 8, 1876 – November 23, 1951), birth name Chu Chih-chun (居之駿 / 居之骏, also romanized as Ju Zhijun in Hanyu Pinyin), was a Chinese politician who was a leader in the Chinese Nationalist Party, or KMT, in the 1930s and 1940s. As president of the Judicial Yuan, he administered China's court system from 1932 to 1948. He ran in the presidential election of 1948 as the token opponent of Chiang Kai-shek. He was also known by his courtesy name Chueh-sheng (覺生 / 觉生, also romanized as Juesheng in Hanyu Pinyin).

== Life and career ==
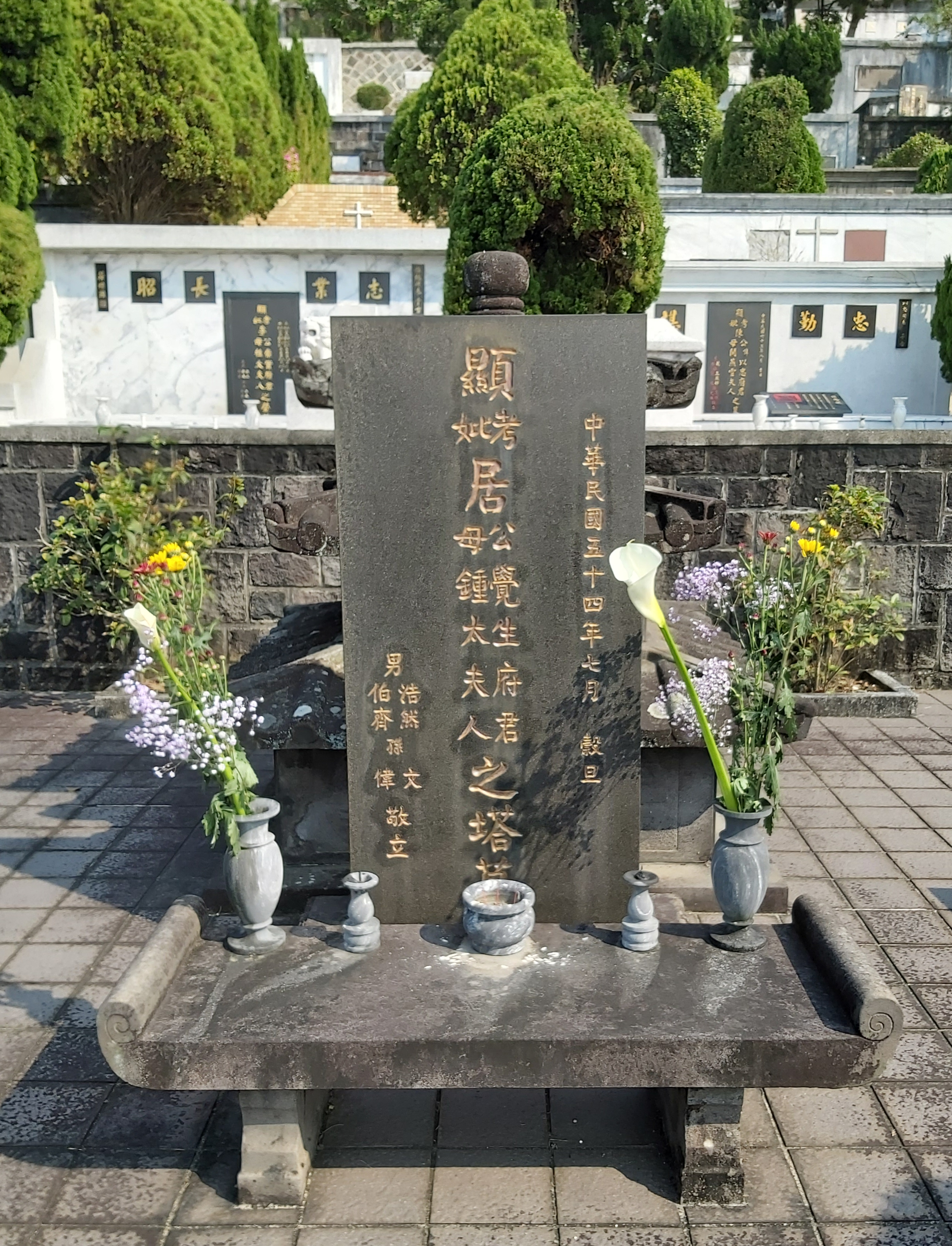
Tomb of Chu Cheng in Taipei

Chu was born in Guangji, Huangzhou in Hubei Province (modern Wuxue city) on November 8, 1876. He joined the Tongmenghui, a revolutionary party founded by Sun Yat-sen, while studying law at Nihon University in Japan in 1907. Later, he worked for Chinese-language newspapers in Rangoon and Singapore. He returned to China to work for an anti-Qing revolutionary faction in Hubei. In 1912, he was briefly vice minister of the interior in the Provisional Government in Nanjing with Sun as president. He was commander of the Woosung Forts north of Shanghai during the Second Revolution in July 1913. In 1916, he led an uprising against Yuan Shikai in Shandong and briefly captured the city of Weixian. In 1921, Sun appointed him interior minister for the Nationalist administration in Guangzhou.

Chu was a founding member of the Western Hills Group, formed after Sun died in 1925. This group opposed communist influence in the KMT. Chu was appointed president of the Judicial Yuan by Chiang in 1932. This was one of the five branches of government in the KMT system. In the presidential election of April 20, 1948, Chu was persuaded to oppose Chiang's candidacy and received 10 percent of the vote in the National Assembly, with Chiang elected overwhelmingly. After he resigned as president of the Judicial Yuan on July 1, 1948, Chu was appointed to the Control Yuan, an auditing board. When the KMT was defeated by the Chinese Communists in 1949, Chu fled to Taiwan.

== Tamkang College of English ==
Chu co-founded Tamkang College of English, now Tamkang University, in Taipei in 1950 as the first Director of the Board when Chang Ming, his son-in-law and ex-president of Tamkang Middle School consulted him to establish a higher education facility in Taiwan. He died on November 23, 1951. Chu Hao-ran, his son, succeeded him as president of Tamkang. November 8, Chu's birthday, is marked annually as the school's founding day. The school's Chueh-sheng Memorial Library is named in his honor.
