= Tsai Jeong-duen =

Vice President of the Judicial Yuan

- 蔡烱燉
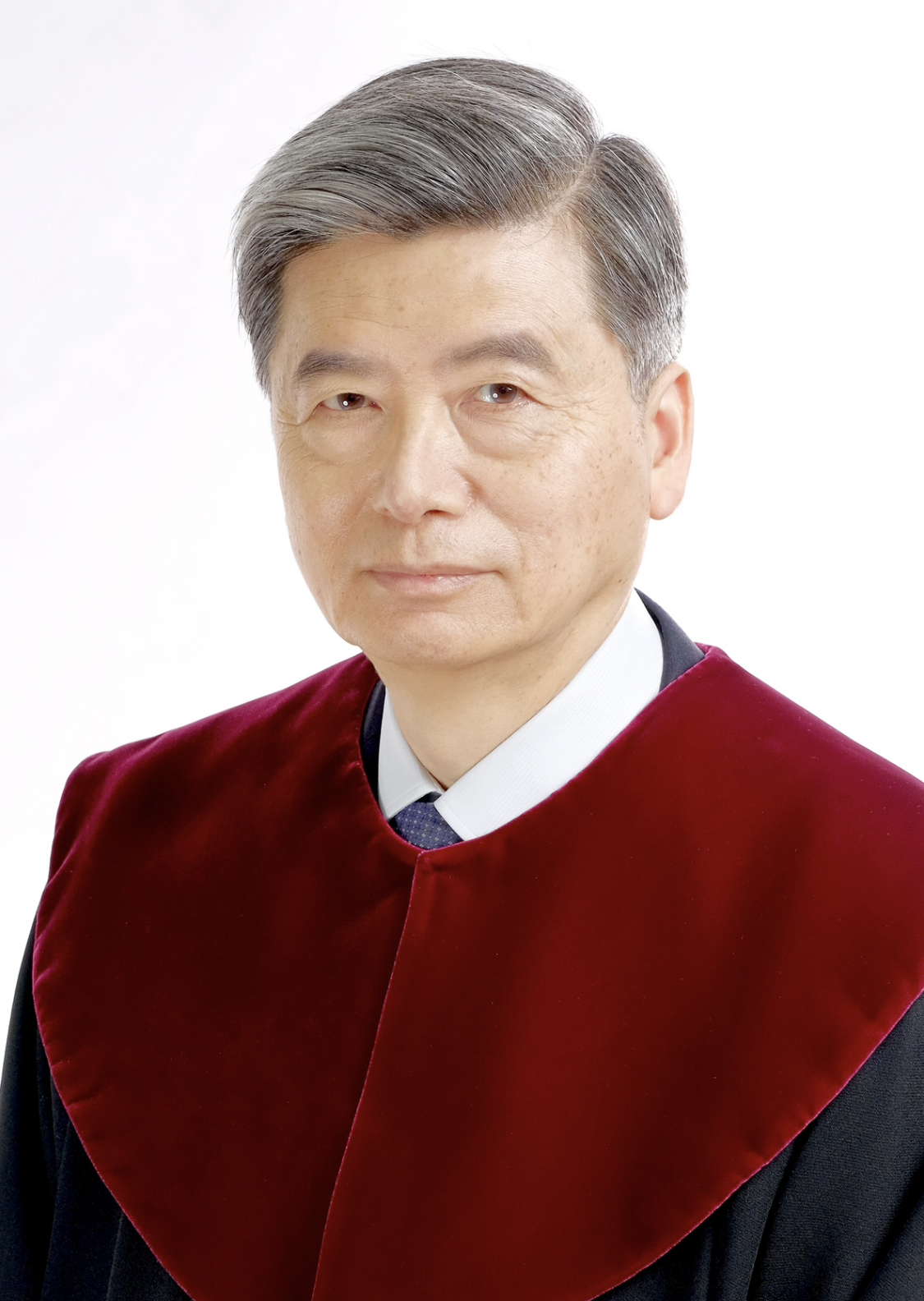
- Official portrait, 2016

13th Vice President of the Judicial Yuan
- In office 1 November 2016 – 1 November 2024
- President: Hsu Tzong-li
- Preceded by: Su Yeong-chin
- Succeeded by: Vacant

Personal details
- Born: 1953 (age 72–73)
- Party: Independent (2012－present)
- Other political affiliations: Kuomintang (－2012)
- Education: National Chengchi University (LLB, PhD); National Chung Hsing University (LLM)

Tsai Jeong-duen (Chinese: 蔡烱燉; pinyin: Cài Jiǒngdùn) is a Taiwanese jurist who has served as the vice president of Judicial Yuan since 1 November 2016.

== Education ==
Tsai was born in 1953. After high school, he studied law at National Chengchi University and graduated with an LL.B. degree. He then earned an LL.M. from National Chung Hsing University and, in 1991, his Ph.D. in law from National Chengchi University. His doctoral dissertation was titled, "A study of the right to collective labor disputes: A comparative study of the legal systems of China, the United States, and Japan".

== See also ==
- Law of the Republic of China
