= Judicial Yuan =

Judicial branch of Taiwan

Judicial Yuan (Constitutional Court)
- 司法院; Sīfǎ Yuàn (Mandarin); Su-hoat Īⁿ (Taiwanese); Sṳ̂-fap Yen (Hakka)

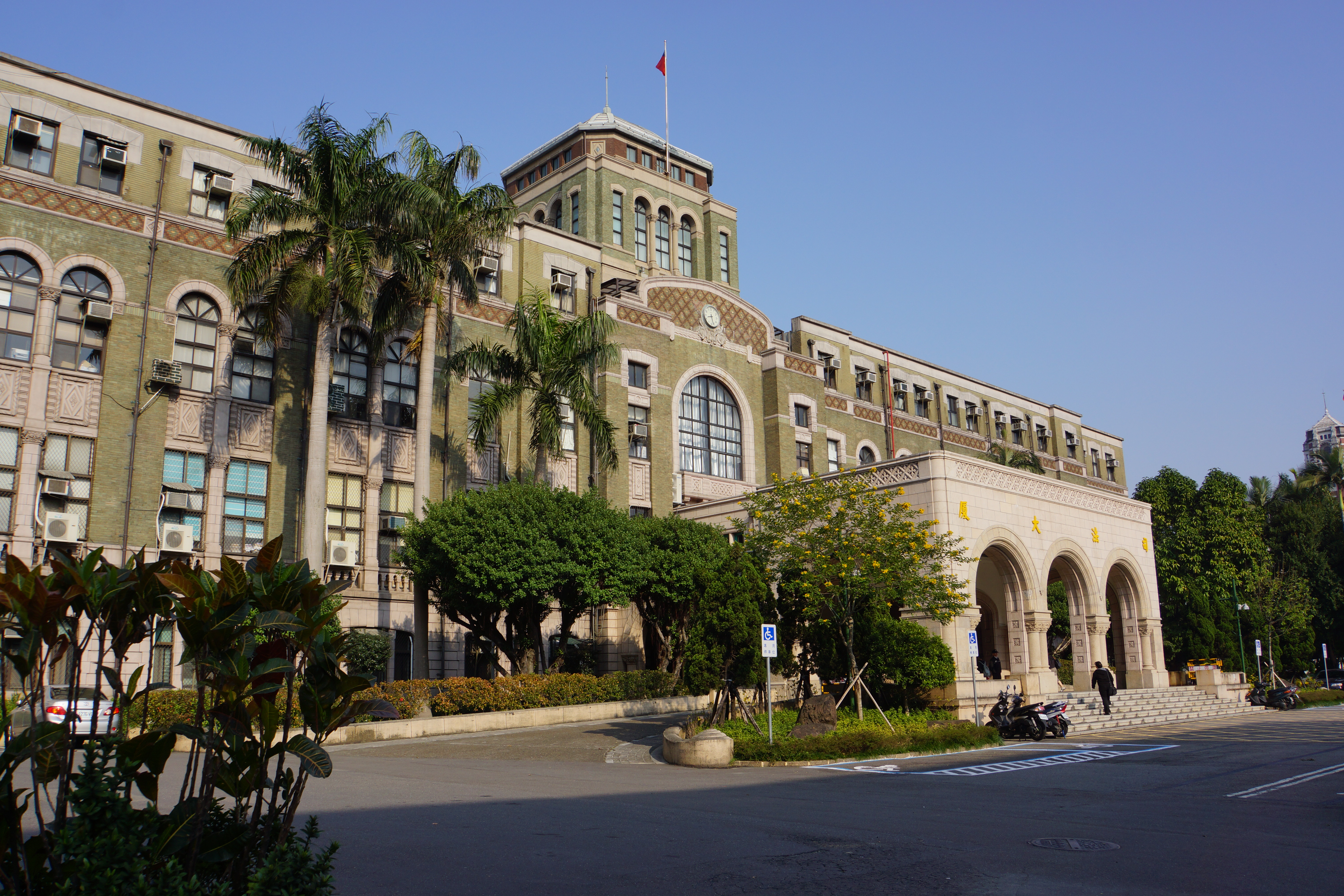
- The Judicial Building houses the Constitutional Court
- Interactive map of Judicial Yuan (Constitutional Court)
- 25.0379°N 121.5121°E
- Established: 1947
- Dissolved: 1 October 1949 (Mainland China)
- Jurisdiction: Mainland China (1947–1949); Taiwan Area (from 1949)
- Location: Zhongzheng, Taipei
- Coordinates: 25.0379°N 121.5121°E
- Composition method: Presidential appointment with Legislative Yuan consent
- Authorised by: Additional Articles and original Constitution of the Republic of China
- Judge term length: 8 years
- Number of positions: 15
- Website: judicial.gov.tw

President and Chief Justice
- Currently: Shieh Ming-yan acting
- Since: November 1, 2024

Vice President and Justice
- Currently: Post vacant
- Since: November 1, 2024

Judicial Yuan
- Chinese: 司法院
Transcriptions
Standard Mandarin
- Hanyu Pinyin: Sīfǎ Yuàn
- Bopomofo: ㄙ ㄈㄚˇ ㄩㄢˋ
- Wade–Giles: Szu^{1}-fa^{3} Yüan^{4}
- Tongyong Pinyin: Sīhfǎ Yuàn
- MPS2: Sz̄fǎ Yuàn
- IPA: [sɹ̩́.fà ɥɛ̂n]
Hakka
- Romanization: Sṳ̂-fap Yen
Southern Min
- Hokkien POJ: Su-hoat Īⁿ
- Tâi-lô: Su-huat Īnn

The Judicial Yuan (Chinese: 司法院; pinyin: Sīfǎ Yuàn; Pe̍h-ōe-jī: Su-hoat Īⁿ) is the judicial branch of the Republic of China, which previously ruled the mainland and now controls Taiwan. It functions as the Constitutional Court and oversees the courts of Taiwan, including the ordinary courts such as the Supreme Court, high courts, and district courts as well as special courts like administrative, and disciplinary courts. The Judicial Yuan holds the following powers:

- Interpretation – Acting as the Constitutional Court to interpret the Constitution and other statutes and regulations made by the central or local government.
- Adjudication – Most civil, criminal, and administrative cases are adjudicated by the respective courts supervised by the Judicial Yuan. The Constitutional Court adjudicate presidential impeachment and political party dissolution cases.
- Discipline – Disciplinary measures with respect to public functionaries are adjudicated by the Disciplinary court.
- Judicial Administration – The Judicial Yuan supervises administrative affairs of all courts established by Taiwanese law.

According to the current Constitution, the Constitutional Court consists of fifteen justices. One justice acts as the president of the court, and another acts as the vice president. All justices, including the president and vice president, are appointed by the president of the Republic with the consent of the Legislative Yuan. Upon appointment justices have a term limit of eight years, but this term limit does not apply to the president and vice president.

== Constitutional Court ==
=== History ===
Before the 1980s, the impact of the Constitutional Court was limited by authoritarian governance. The Court could be seen as an instrument of the Kuomintang regime. It never accepted a case on the constitutionality of the Temporary Provisions, which were the basis of authoritarian rule; The Court declined to hear challenges to these Provisions, and issued a number of decisions that facilitated Kuomintang rule within the confines of at least nominal constitutionalism. For the most part, the court served as a legal advisor to the government, rendering decisions that unified interpretations of statutes or ordinances or providing legitimacy for these politically expedient solutions as a result of extension of legislative representatives' terms. In Interpretation No 31 of 1954, the court extended the legislative representatives' terms, ruling that 'the nation was under crisis and the country could not hold the election for the second term legally'. In the 1960s and 1970s, the Constitutional Court further affirmed the constitutionality of adding extra seats to both the Legislative Yuan and the National Assembly by means of legislative enactments in Interpretation Nos 117 and 150.

Prior to the 1980s, the Constitutional Court rarely asserted itself as the guardian of the Constitution; on rare occasions, however, the court nevertheless risked undermining its own institutional authority by standing in opposition to other branches of government. In Interpretation No 86 of 1960, the court held that the law that allowed the Ministry of Justice to supervise the lower courts was inconsistent with the constitution and required all courts to be placed under the Judicial Yuan. However, this decision was ignored by the government, and the impugned law was not revised until 1980.

After the succession of Lee Teng-hui as president in 1987, however, the Court gradually became more active. It began to strike administrative actions that were vague or delegated too much power to the executive branch. Amongst its decisions, the Court ended the ban on rallies advocating secessionism or communism as a violation of free speech, allowed universities to refuse to allow military "counselors", whose presence in dorms had formerly been mandatory, and allowed teachers to form a union outside the "official" union structure. Constitutional amendments in 1992 provided for the Court to hear challenges against "unconstitutional" political parties, defined as those whose "goals or activities jeopardize the existence of the ROC or a free democratic constitutional order."

Amidst the divided government between 2000 and 2008, the Constitutional Court became a primary political mediator of highly charged political disputes; it adopted a 'dialectic approach' in facilitation of political dialogues. For example, in a constitutional dispute concerning the suspension of the construction of a nuclear power plant, the Court held that the Democratic Progressive Party-led Executive Yuan should negotiate with the Kuomintang-dominated Legislative Yuan to resolve the issue. The unity of the executive and legislative branches since 2008 has seen a decline in the number of politically high-profile cases entering into the Constitutional Court's docket. At the same time, the number of individuals' petitions challenging legislative or executive acts on grounds of violation of constitutional rights continued to rise steadily, and the Constitutional Court has responded to these rights challenges with a high number of declarations of unconstitutionality.

=== Functions ===
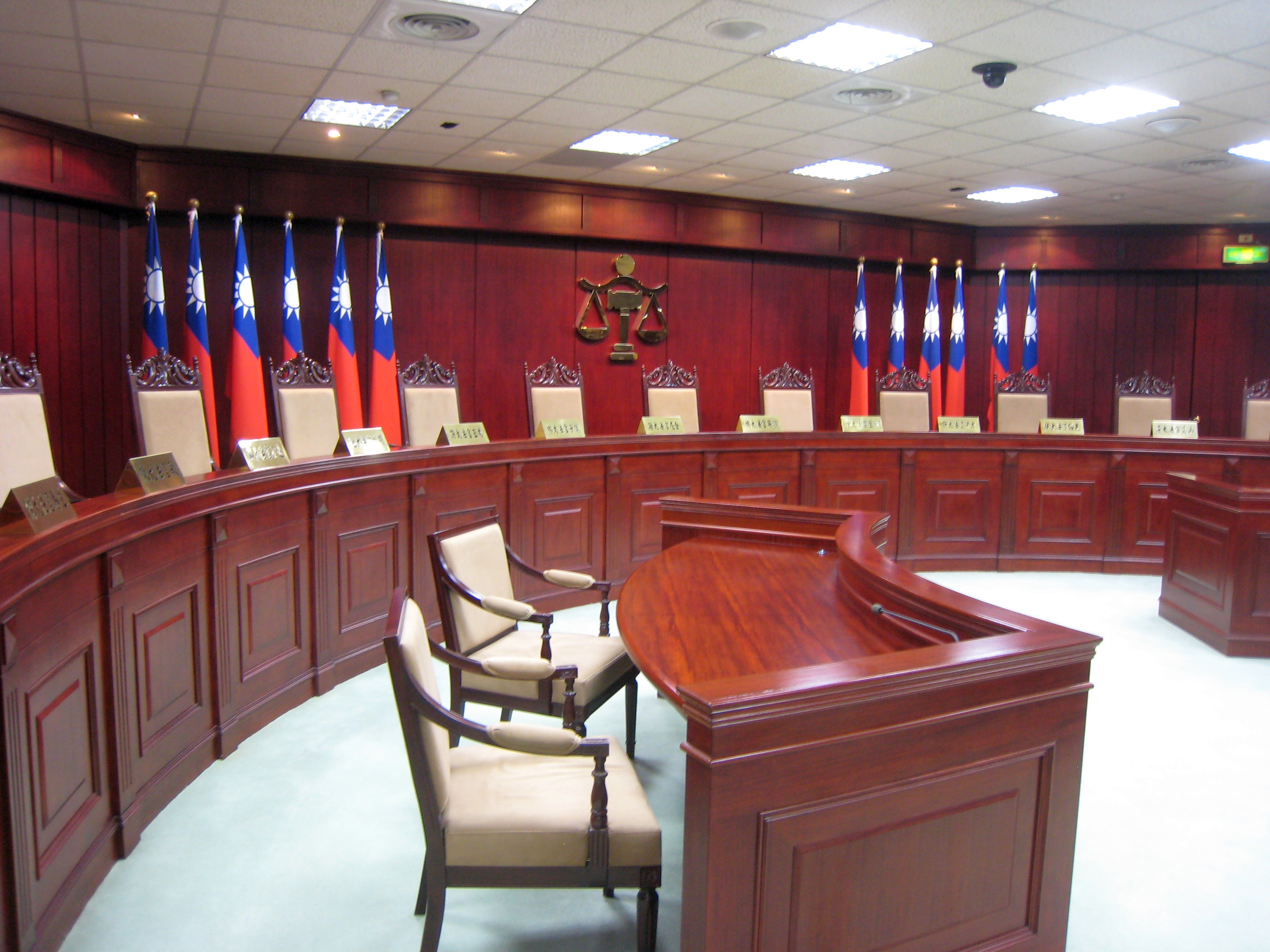
The Constitutional Court consists of 15 justices.

The Constitutional Court (Chinese: 憲法法庭; pinyin: Xiànfǎ Fǎtíng; Pe̍h-ōe-jī: Hiàn-hoat Hoat-têng), also previously known as the Council of Grand Justices (大法官會議), provides rulings on the following six categories of cases:

1. Constitutionality of laws and constitutional complaints (Chapter III cases);
2. Disputes between constitutional organs (Chapter IV cases);
3. Impeachment of the President and the Vice President (Chapter V cases);
4. Dissolution of unconstitutional political parties (Chapter VI cases);
5. Local self-government (Chapter VII cases); and
6. Uniform interpretation of statutes and regulations (Chapter VIII cases).

A petition to declare regulations or laws unconstitutional (Chapter III cases) shall be filed in the following circumstances:

- A highest state organ which, in the exercise of its powers or on account of its subordinate agency's exercise of powers, considers that the applicable law is in contravention of the Constitution may lodge a petition with the Constitutional Court for a judgment declaring the impugned law unconstitutional. A subordinate agency which, in the exercise of its powers, considers that the applicable law is in contravention of the Constitution may request its superior agency to lodge the petition;
- A quarter or more of the incumbent Legislators who, in the exercise of their powers, believe that the relevant statutory law is in contravention of the Constitution may lodge a petition with the Constitutional Court for a judgment declaring the impugned statutory law unconstitutional;
- A court which strongly believes, on reasonable grounds, that an applicable statutory law on whose validity depends the court's decision of a pending case is in contravention of the Constitution may lodge a petition with the Constitutional Court for a judgment declaring the impugned applicable law unconstitutional; or
- After exhaustion of all ordinary judicial remedies, any person who believes that a final court decision that finds against her or him or a legal provision applied in such a court decision contravenes the Constitution may lodge a petition with the Constitutional Court for a judgment declaring the decision or the impugned legal provision unconstitutional.

=== Justices ===
There are in total of 15 justices (Chinese: 大法官; pinyin: Dàfǎguān; Pe̍h-ōe-jī: Tōa-hoat-koaⁿ) serving in the Constitutional Court, current members include:

President and Chief Justice	Vice President and Justice
Shieh Ming-yan	Vacant
Justices
Term from 2019 to 2027	Term from 2019 to 2027
Lu Tai-lang; Shieh Ming-yan; Tsai Tzung-jen; Yang Hui-chin	Judy Ju; Tsai Tsai-chen; Chen Chung-wu; Greg Yo; Ju Fu-Meei

=== Important decisions ===
Important decisions of the Constitutional Court are listed as the following.

==== Interpretations made before the Constitutional Court Procedure Act ====
No.	Date	Summary	Ref
1	Jan 6, 1949	Legislative Yuan members shall not hold positions in executive government concurrently.	
31	Jan 29, 1954	Extended term of the first Legislative Yuan and Control Yuan indefinitely until the next elections in China.	
76	May 3, 1957	The issue of the tricameral parliament of China: National Assembly, Control Yuan and Legislative Yuan	
86	Aug 15, 1960	All high courts and district courts shall be organizationally placed under the Judicial Yuan	
99	Dec 19, 1962	The New Taiwan Dollar shall be the national fiat money, not local currency, and the Central Bank entrusted the issuance.	
261	Jun 21, 1990	Term of the first National Assembly, Legislative Yuan, and Control Yuan shall be terminated by December 31, 1991. This interpretation resulted in the total re-election of the National Assembly in 1991 and the Legislative Yuan in 1992. This interpretation also opened the subsequent legislative elections in Taiwan.	
328	Nov 11, 1993	Coverage of the national territory shall not be interpreted by the Constitutional Court.	
365	Sep 23, 1994	Judged the jus sanguinis principle in the Taiwanese nationality law shall apply to both mother and father.	
499	Mar 24, 2000	Voided the 5th amendment of the Additional Articles of the Constitution	
644	Jun 20, 2008	Judged the ban of "advocate Communism or secession" in the Civil Associations Act as unconstitutional.	
748	May 24, 2017	Judged the statutory ban on same-sex marriage in the Taiwanese Civil Code as unconstitutional. The government shall take motion to legalize same-sex marriage in Taiwan.	
791	May 29, 2020	Judged the criminalization of adultery as unconstitutional.	

===== Interpretation No. 31 =====
In 1954, the Council of Grand Justices extended the terms of members of the Legislative Yuan and the Control Yuan elected in 1948, ruling that:

"[T]he nation was under crisis and the country could not hold the election for the second term legally."

As a result of the council's ruling, first-term members of the Legislative and Control Yuans continued to serve for the next four decades until 1992, resulting in distortions of representation. Following the death of some of those representatives, the Temporary Provisions against the Communist Rebellion were amended to allow vacancies to be filled by holding supplementary elections or by adding more seats for representatives elected locally in Taiwan.

===== Interpretation No. 261 =====
The Council of Grand Justices issued interpretation No. 261 on June 21, 1990. The Council of Grand Justices ruled on the constitutionality of the continued sitting in the National Assembly of members elected on the mainland in 1948 and ordered that:

"[T]hose first-term national representatives who have not been re-elected on a periodical basis to cease the exercise of their powers no later than December 31, 1991."

The court further required the government to hold a nationwide second-term election of the national representatives including a certain number of representatives-at-large for the proper functioning of the constitutional system.

===== Interpretation No. 499 =====
The Constitutional Court, in voiding the 5th amendment of the Additional Articles of the Constitution, developed criteria by which the constitutionality of a constitutional amendment should be judged:

- a constitutional amendment must be enacted in accordance with constitutional due process; and
- since a constitutional amendment is enacted on the basis of powers bestowed by the constitution, it cannot alter ‘the existing constitutional provisions of essential significance, such as the principle of the democratic republic, the principle of sovereignty of and by the people, the core contents of fundamental rights of people, and the principle of checks and balances of governmental powers.’

==== Judgements made after the Constitutional Court Procedure Act ====
No.	Date	Summary	Ref
Judgement 2, 111	Feb 25, 2022	"Reasonable Compensation" stated in Paragraph 1, Article 195 of the Civil code does not include compulsory apology ordered by a judicial court.	

== Ordinary courts ==
=== Supreme court ===
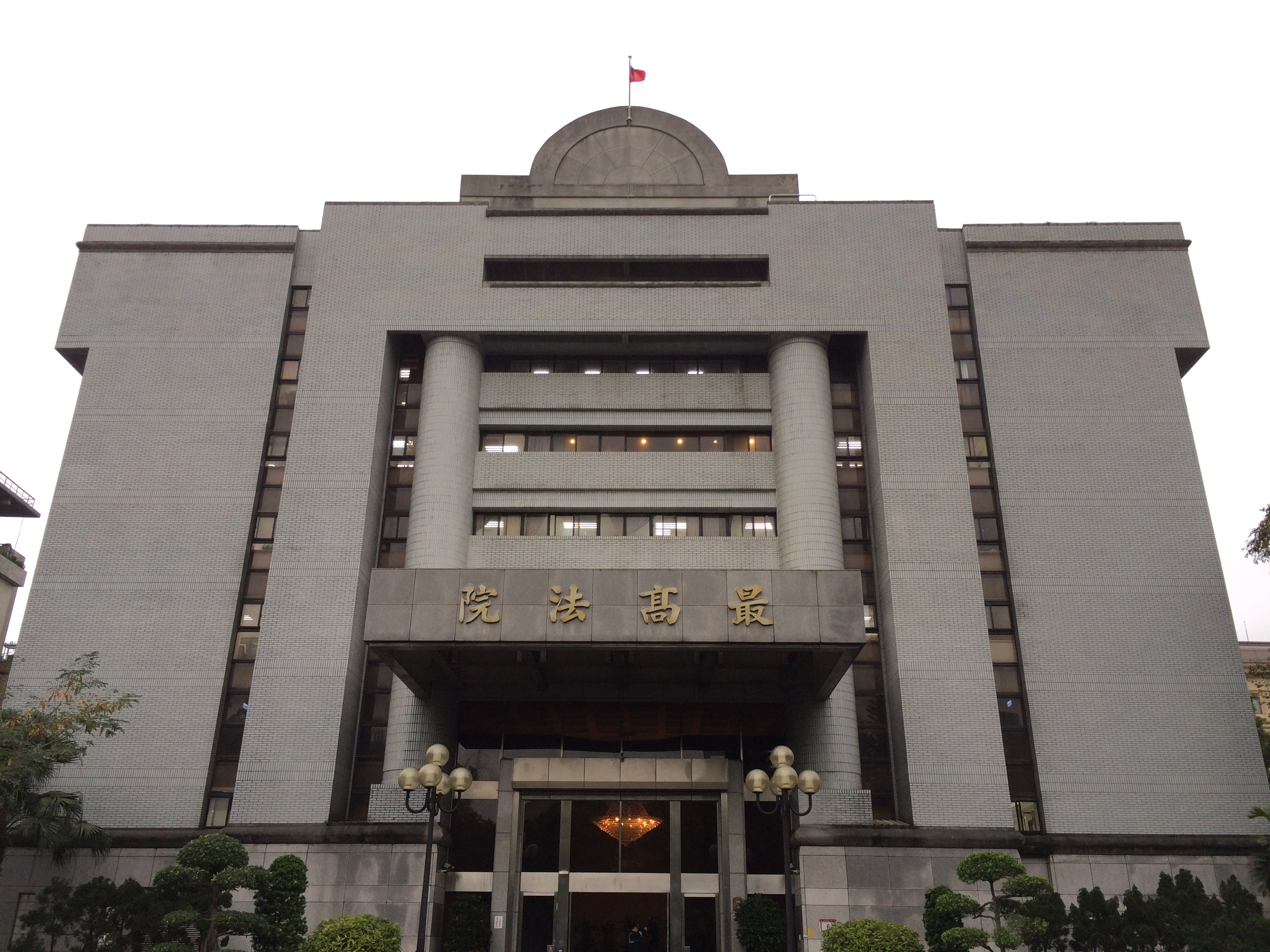
Supreme Court

The Supreme Court (Chinese: 最高法院; pinyin: Zuìgāo Fǎyuàn; Pe̍h-ōe-jī: Chòe-ko Hoat-īⁿ) is the court of last resort for civil and criminal cases. A civil case can be appealed to the Supreme Court only when more than NT $1,500,000 is at stake. Except for petty offences enumerated in Article 376 of the Code of Criminal Procedure, any criminal case may be appealed to the Court.

This Court exercises jurisdiction over the following cases:

- appeals from judgments of High Courts or their branches as courts of first instance in criminal cases;
- appeals from judgments of High Courts or their branches as courts of second instance in civil and criminal cases;
- appeals from rulings of High Courts or their branches;
- appeals from judgments or rulings rendered by the civil court of second instance by the summary procedure, the amounts in controversy exceeding NT $1,500,000, and with permission granted in accordance with specified provisions;
- civil and criminal retrials within the jurisdiction of the court of third instance;
- extraordinary appeals; or
- any other case as specified by laws.

=== High court ===
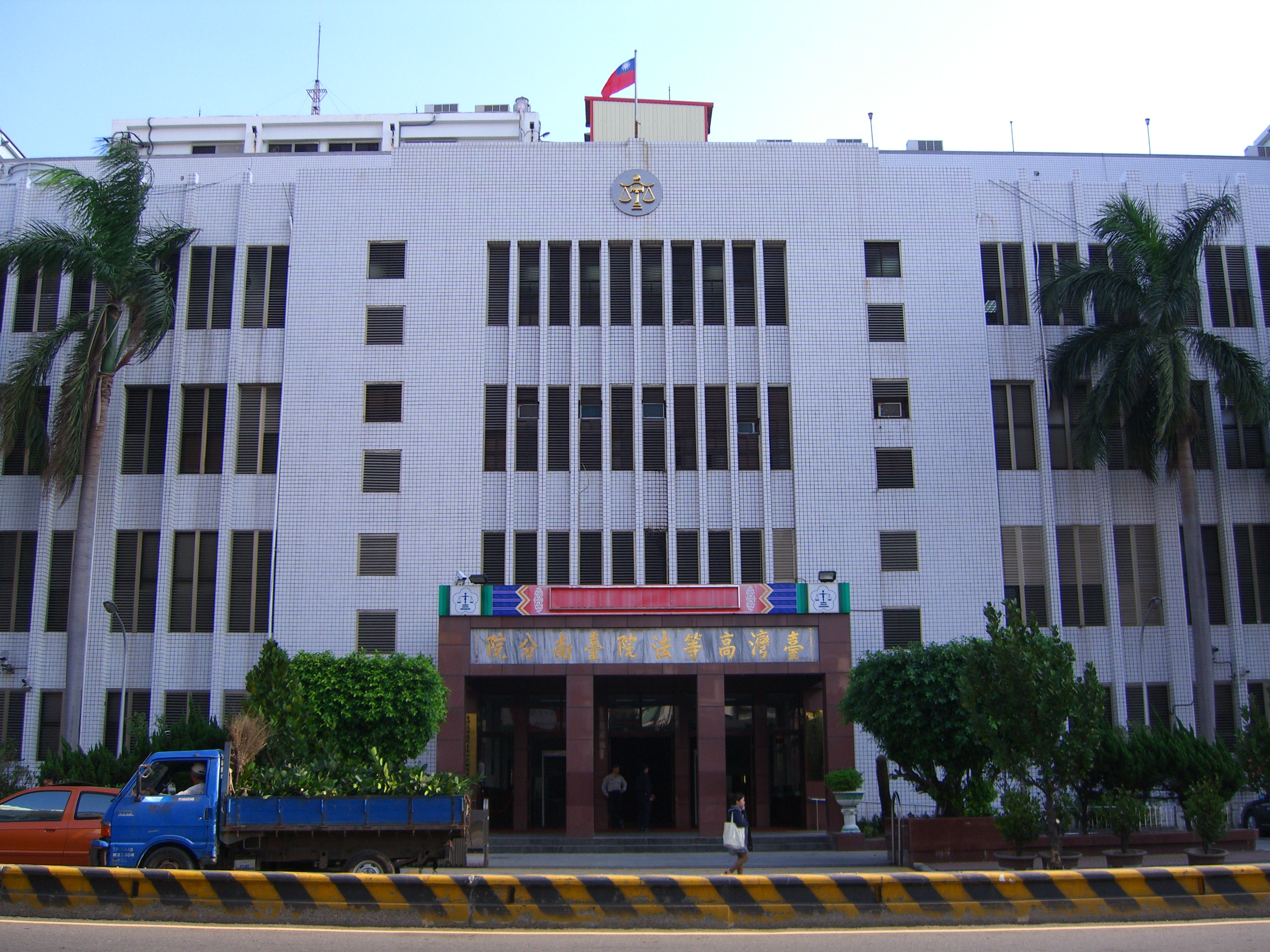
Tainan High Court

There are six high courts (Chinese: 高等法院; pinyin: Gāoděng Fǎyuàn; Pe̍h-ōe-jī: Ko-téng Hoat-īⁿ) branches in Taiwan:

No.	Name	Chinese
1	Taiwan High Court	臺灣高等法院
2	Taiwan High Court Taichung Branch Court	臺灣高等法院臺中分院
3	Taiwan High Court Tainan Branch Court	臺灣高等法院臺南分院
4	Taiwan High Court Kaohsiung Branch Court	臺灣高等法院高雄分院
5	Taiwan High Court Hualien Branch Court	臺灣高等法院花蓮分院
6	Fujian High Court Kinmen Branch Court	福建高等法院金門分院

The High Courts and its branches exercise jurisdiction over the following cases:

- Appeals from judgments of the District Courts or their branches as courts of the first instance in ordinary proceedings of civil and criminal cases;
- Interlocutory appeals from rulings of the District Courts or their branches in ordinary proceedings;
- First instance criminal cases relating to rebellion, treason, and offenses against friendly relations with foreign states;
- Military appellate cases whose judgments are imprisonment for a definite period rendered by the High Military Courts and their branches; and
- Other cases prescribed by law.

The high courts and its branch courts are divided into civil, criminal and specialized divisions. Each division is composed of one division chief judge and two associate judges. Additionally, the high courts and its branch courts have a clerical bureau, which is headed by a chief clerk who assists the president with administrative affairs.

Cases before the high courts or its branch courts are heard and decided by a panel of three judges. However, one of the judges may conduct preparatory proceedings.

The Court has seven civil courts, each of which has one presiding judge and three judges to handle civil appeals of the second instance and counter-appeal cases under the system of collegial panels, but they do not deal with simple litigation. The Court has eleven criminal courts, each of which has one presiding judge and two or three judges to handle criminal appeals of the second instance and counter-appeal cases under the system of collegial panels as well as litigation of the first instance concerning civil strife, foreign aggression or violation of foreign relations. Based on various needs, the Court manages several professional courts such as the Professional Court of Fair Trade Cases, Family Professional Court, Professional Court of International Trade, Maritime Professional Court, Professional Court of State Compensation, Professional Court of Anti-corruption, Professional Court of Intellectual Property Rights, Professional Court of Juvenile Delinquency, Professional Court of Serious Criminal Cases, Professional Court of Public Security, Professional Court of Fair Trade Act, Professional Court of Sexual Harassment, etc.

=== District court ===
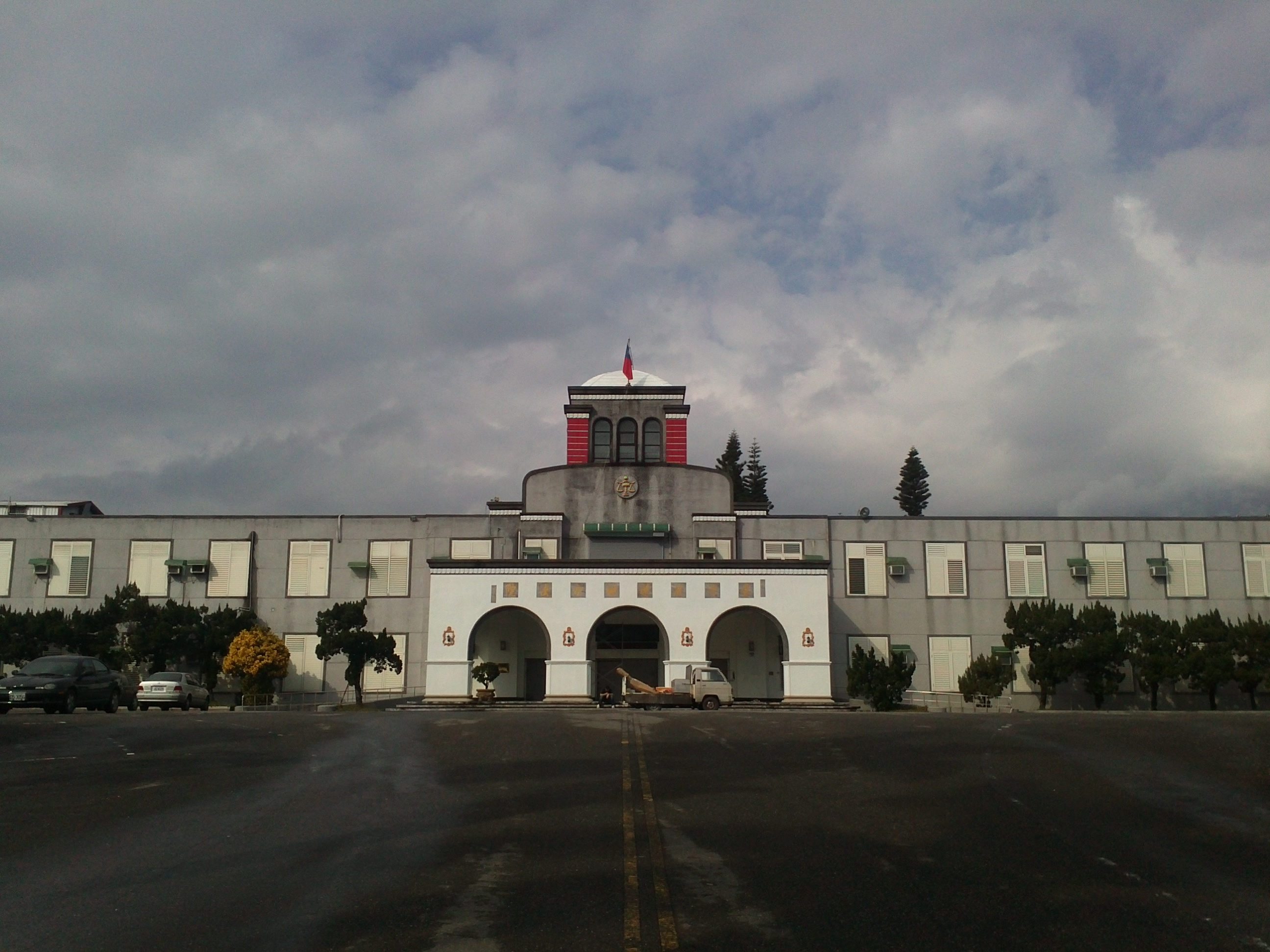
Hualien District Court

There are currently 22 district courts (Chinese: 地方法院; pinyin: Dìfāng Fǎyuàn; Pe̍h-ōe-jī: Tē-hng Hoat-īⁿ) in Taiwan:

No.	Name	Chinese	No.	Name	Chinese	No.	Name	Chinese
1	Changhua	臺灣彰化地方法院	9	Lienchiang	福建連江地方法院	17	Tainan	臺灣臺南地方法院
2	Chiayi	臺灣嘉義地方法院	10	Miaoli	臺灣苗栗地方法院	18	Taipei	臺灣臺北地方法院
3	Ciaotou	臺灣橋頭地方法院	11	Nantou	臺灣南投地方法院	19	Taitung	臺灣臺東地方法院
4	Hsinchu	臺灣新竹地方法院	12	New Taipei	臺灣新北地方法院	20	Taoyuan	臺灣桃園地方法院
5	Hualien	臺灣花蓮地方法院	13	Penghu	臺灣澎湖地方法院	21	Yilan	臺灣宜蘭地方法院
6	Kaohsiung	臺灣高雄地方法院	14	Pingtung	臺灣屏東地方法院	22	Yunlin	臺灣雲林地方法院
7	Keelung	臺灣基隆地方法院	15	Shilin	臺灣士林地方法院			
8	Kinmen	福建金門地方法院	16	Taichung	臺灣臺中地方法院			

Each district court may establish one or more summary divisions for the adjudication of cases suitable for summary judgment. The civil summary procedure is for cases involving an amount in controversy of not more than 300,000 New Taiwan dollar and for simple legal disputes. Currently there are a total of 45 divisions in Taiwan. Additionally, there is a Taiwan Kaohsiung Juvenile Court, established in accordance with the Law Governing the Disposition of Juvenile Cases.

Each of the district courts have civil, criminal and summary divisions and may establish specialized divisions to handle cases involving juveniles, family, traffic, and labor matters as well as motions to set aside rulings on violations of the Statute for the Maintenance of Social Order. Each division has a Division Chief Judge who supervises and assigns the business of the division. Each district court has a public defender’s office and a probation officer’s office.

A single judge hears and decides cases in ordinary and summary proceedings as well as in small claims cases. A panel of three judges decides cases of great importance in ordinary proceedings as well as appeals or interlocutory appeals from the summary and small claims proceedings. Criminal cases are decided by a panel of three judges, with the exception of summary proceedings which may be held by a single judge. The Juvenile Court hears and decides only cases involving juveniles.

== Special courts ==
=== Administrative court ===
The administrative courts (Chinese: 行政法院; pinyin: Xíngzhèng Fǎyuàn; Pe̍h-ōe-jī: Hêng-chèng Hoat-īⁿ) handle cases regarding administrative litigation. The current administrative litigation system adopts a "Two Level Two Instance System" litigation procedure. The administrative courts are classified into the High Administrative Court, which is the court of first instance, and the Supreme Administrative Court, which is the appellate court. The first instance of the High Administrative Court is a trial of facts. The Supreme Administrative Court is an appellate court.

Name	Chinese
Supreme Administrative Court	最高行政法院
Taipei High Administrative Court	臺北高等行政法院
Taichung High Administrative Court	臺中高等行政法院
Kaohsiung High Administrative Court	高雄高等行政法院
Tainan High Administrative Court (planned)	臺南高等行政法院（籌設中）

=== Intellectual Property and Commercial Court ===
The Intellectual Property and Commercial Court (Chinese: 智慧財產及商業法院; pinyin: Zhìhuìcáichǎn Fǎyuàn; Pe̍h-ōe-jī: Tì-hūi-châi-sán Hoat-īⁿ) handles cases regarding intellectual properties and commerce.

=== Disciplinary court ===
The disciplinary court (Chinese: 懲戒法院; pinyin: Chéngjiè Fǎyuàn; Pe̍h-ōe-jī: Têng-kài Hoat-īⁿ) maintains official discipline and punishes public servants, regardless of rank or appointment, for violations of the law or negligence in his or her duty in accordance with Article 77 of the Constitution.

Since July 17, 2020, the court has also housed the Disciplinary Chamber of the Judiciary (職務法庭), which hears disciplinary cases against judges and prosecutors under the Judges Act. The chamber sits in two instances, and in disciplinary cases two lay members chosen from scholars and other members of the public sit at first instance alongside three professional judges.

== Judges ==
Article 80 of the Constitution states that Judges shall be above partisanship and shall, in accordance with law, hold trials independently, free from any interference. Furthermore, Article 81 states that Judges shall hold office for life. No judge shall be removed from office unless he has been guilty of a criminal offense or subjected to disciplinary measure, or declared to be under interdiction. No judge shall, except in accordance with law, be suspended or transferred or have his salary reduced. Judges shall be appointed from those persons who have passed the Examination of Judicial Officials, completed the Training Course for Judicial Officials and possessed distinguished records after a term of practice. Since 2011 the appointment, conduct, discipline and remuneration of judges have been regulated in detail by the Judges Act. Besides the judicial examination, the Act provides routes into the judiciary for experienced attorneys, prosecutors and legal academics; it established a Judicial Evaluation Committee, which includes members from outside the judiciary, to examine complaints against individual judges; and it created the Disciplinary Chamber of the Judiciary to hear disciplinary cases against them.

== President and Vice President of the Judicial Yuan ==
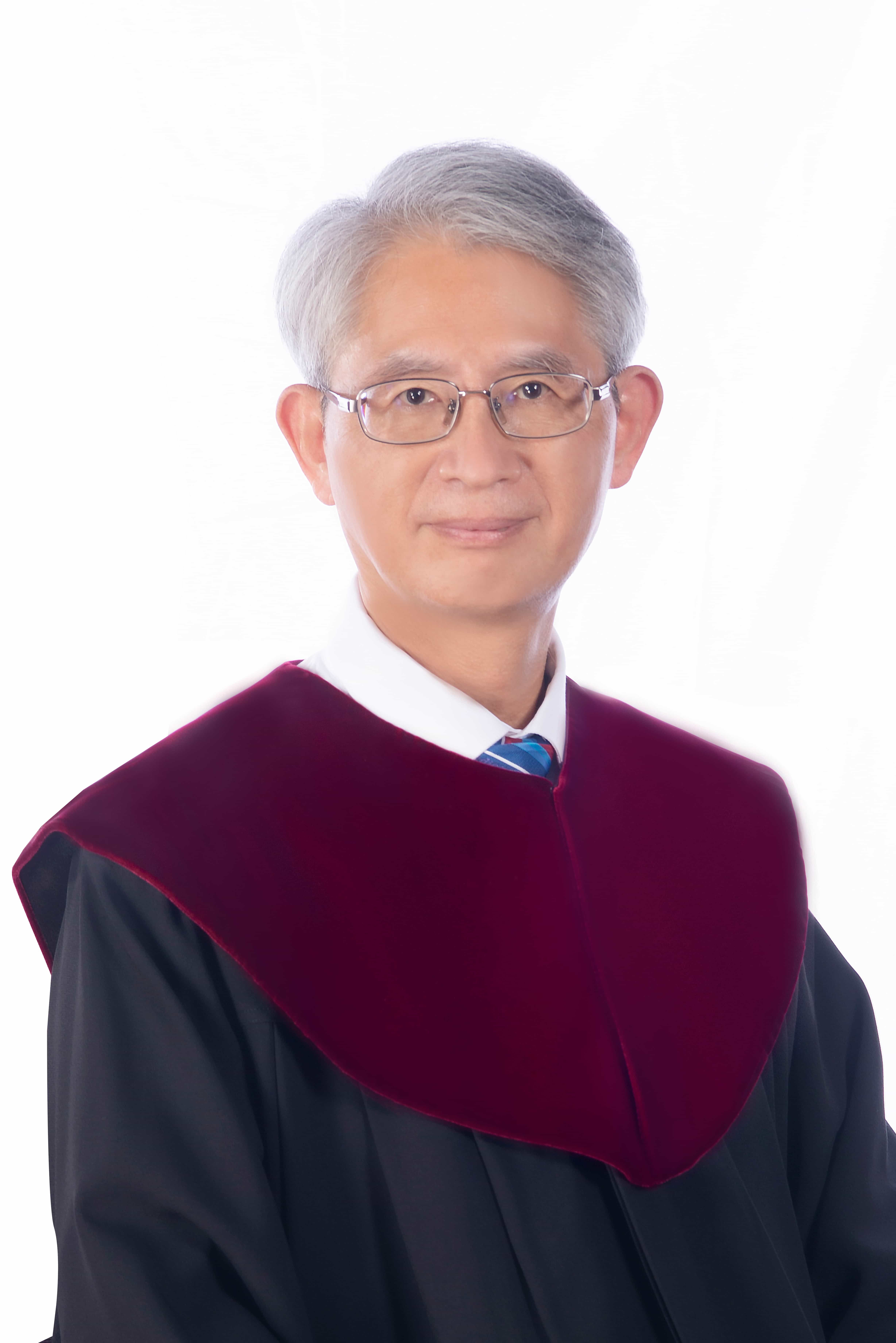
Shieh Ming-yan, the acting President of the Judicial Yuan.

Since a constitutional amendment ratified in 1997, the President and Vice President of the Judicial Yuan need to be justices. However, they are not subject to the 8-year term limit like the other 13 justices. In the current constitution, the President and Vice President of the Judicial Yuan are appointed by the President of the Republic with the approval of the Legislative Yuan.

=== Before 1947 Constitution ===
President	Vice President
Wang Ch'ung-hui (8 October 1928 – 6 January 1932); Ju Zheng (7 January 1932 – 1 July 1948)	Zhang Ji (November 1928 – January 1932); Ju Zheng (January 1932 – March 1932); Qin Zhen (March 1932 – April 1947); Li Wenfan (April 1947 – July 1948)

=== 1947 Constitution ===
Term	Date	President	Vice President	Note
1	July 1948 – May 1950	Wang Ch'ung-hui	Shi Zhiquan	Inaugurated in Nanking and moved to Taipei
1	May 1950 – March 1958	Wang Ch'ung-hui	Hsieh Kuan-sheng	President Wang Chung-hui died in office
1	March 1958 – June 1958	Vice President as Acting President	Hsieh Kuan-sheng	
2	June 1958 – July 1965	Hsieh Kuan-sheng	Fu Bingchang	Vice President Fu Ping-chang died in office
2	July 1965 – July 1966	Hsieh Kuan-sheng	Post vacant	
2	July 1966 – December 1971	Hsieh Kuan-sheng	Xie Yingzhou	President Hsieh Kuan-sheng died in office
3	December 1971 – April 1972	Tien Chung-chin	Xie Yingzhou	Vice President Hsieh Ying-chou died in office
3	April 1972 – July 1972	Tien Chung-chin	Post vacant	
3	July 1972 – March 1977	Tien Chung-chin	Tai Yen-hui	President Tien Chung-chin died in office
4	April 1977 – July 1979	Tai Yen-hui	Han Chung-mo	Tai Yen-hui is the first Taiwanese President
5	July 1979 – May 1987	Huang Shao-ku	Hung Shou-nan	
6	May 1, 1987 – May 1, 1993	Lin Yang-kang	Wang Tao-yuan	
6	May 1, 1993 – Sep 1, 1994	Lin Yang-kang	Lu Yu-wen	
7	Sep 1, 1994 – Aug 1, 1998	Shih Chi-yang	Lu Yu-wen	
7	Aug 1, 1998 – Feb 1, 1999	Shih Chi-yang	Post vacant	Constitution amended, justices took over the positions

=== 1997 Constitution amendment ===
Term	Date	President	Vice President
1	Feb 1, 1999 – Sep 30, 2003	Weng Yueh-sheng	Cheng Chung-mo
2	Oct 1, 2003 – Apr 7, 2006	Weng Yueh-sheng	Cheng Chung-mo
3	Apr 7, 2006 – Sep 30, 2007	Weng Yueh-sheng	Lai In-jaw
4	Oct 1, 2007 – Jul 18, 2010	Lai In-jaw	Hsieh Tsai-chuan
4	Jul 19, 2010 – Oct 12, 2010	Vice President as Acting President	Hsieh Tsai-chuan
5	Oct 13, 2010 – Oct 31, 2016	Rai Hau-min	Su Yeong-chin
6	Nov 1, 2016 – Nov 1, 2024	Hsu Tzong-li	Tsai Jeong-duen
6	Nov 1, 2024 – present	Shieh Ming-yan Acting	Post vacant

== See also ==
- Additional Articles of the Constitution of the Republic of China
- Constitution of the Republic of China
- Six Codes
- Law of Taiwan
- Law schools in Taiwan
- Supreme Court of the Republic of China
- High Court (Taiwan)
- District Court (Taiwan)
- Ministry of Justice (Taiwan)
- Supreme Prosecutors Office
- Taiwan High Prosecutors Office
