= Chen Yen-hsiang arson case =

2022 crime in Taiwan

Hsinchu tire shop arson attack
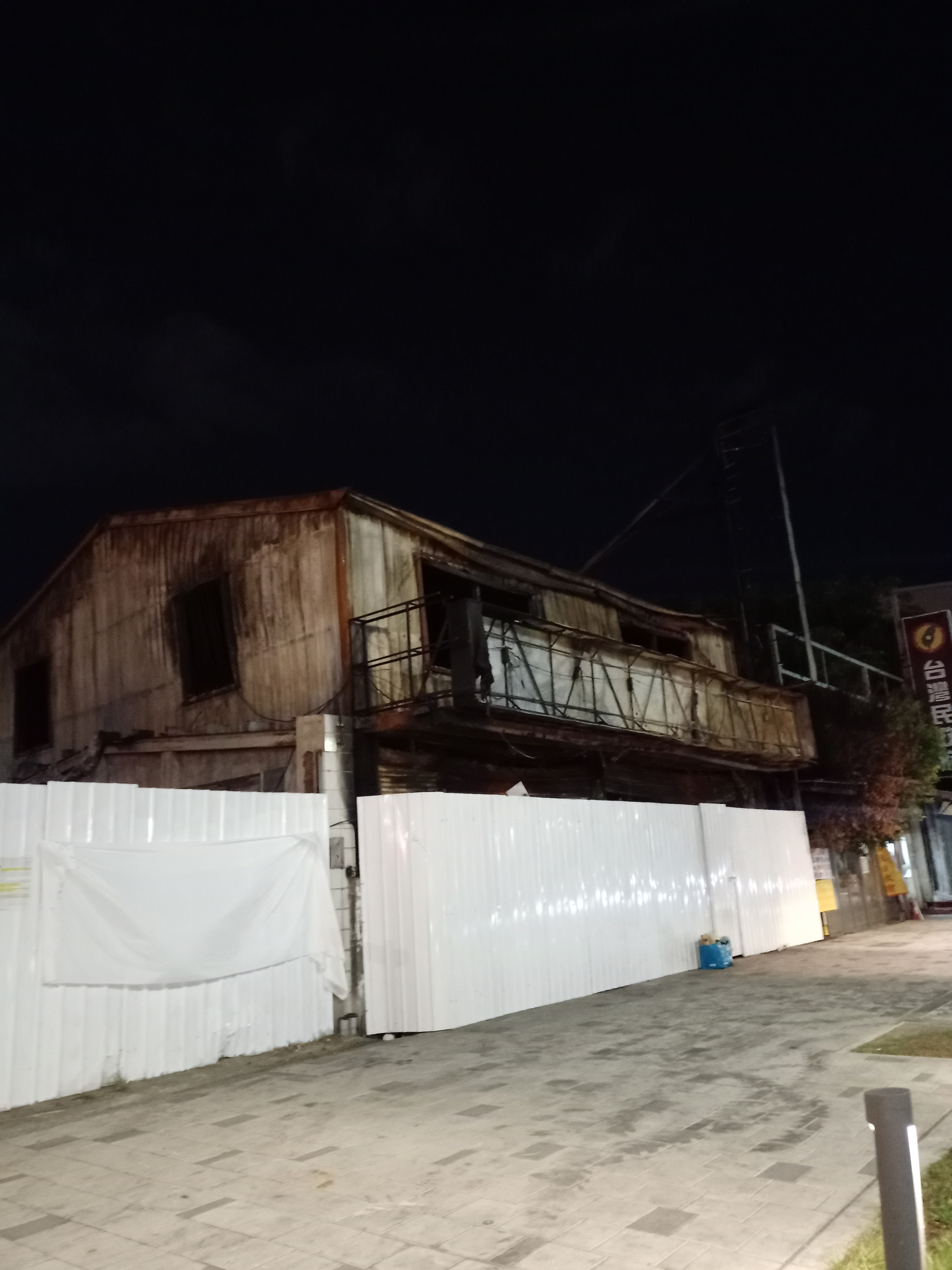
- The Zhengyi Tire Shop after the fire
- Date: 15 June 2022
- Time: 22:00 (UTC+8)
- Location: No. 137, Section 1, Dongda Road, East District, Hsinchu City, Taiwan
- Type: Arson
- Motive: Domestic and financial disputes
- Perpetrator: Chen Yen-hsiang
- Deaths: 8
- Injuries: 2 (including the perpetrator)

On the night of 15 June 2022, Taiwanese man Chen Yen-hsiang (Chinese: 陳彥翔) got into conflicts with his family over domestic and financial disputes. He then poured gasoline and set fire to four motorcycles parked on the first floor of his family's tire shop near the intersection of Section 1, Dongda Road and Zhongyang Road in East District, Hsinchu City. The fire rapidly engulfed the entire metal-sheet building, killing eight members of the family.

== Incident ==
The fire occurred at a Yokohama Rubber Company tire sales and service shop, commonly referred to as an auto repair shop. The two-story corrugated metal building, constructed as a metal building structure, was named Zhengyi Tire. Tires were stored both inside and outside the premises. The first floor served as the shop, while the second floor was used as the family’s residence. In Taiwan, many storefronts—particularly factories—use mixed residential and commercial buildings as their premises in order to reduce rental costs. Following the fire, the building was reduced to ruins and was demolished on 28 June. Experts later noted that occupants had only about three seconds to escape, leaving the chance of survival at "less than 1%". The Hsinchu City Fire Bureau indicated that the four adults had attempted to save the four children in the residence.

According to the surviving father, at around 10:00 p.m. on 15 June, Chen first argued with his mother and later quarreled with his father. He subsequently purchased 20 liters of gasoline for NT$600 at a gas station, returned home, and poured the fuel over motorcycles parked outside. He then ignited a piece of tissue paper with a lighter and threw it onto the gasoline-soaked area, causing flames to spread instantly throughout the metal structure and triggering explosions. Due to the rapid spread of the fire, family members inside had little chance to escape, and only the father survived. Chen's elder brother escaped death because he was serving in the military at the time.

Subsequent police investigations found that Chen had long demanded money from his parents and had been reprimanded on the evening of 15 June. Investigators suspected that, after once again being scolded for asking for money, he purchased gasoline in a fit of anger and deliberately started the fire.

== Victims ==
Names are based on the indictment.

Chen Ping-cheng (Note: Only survivor of the fire scene)	Lin Li-chun (56)
Lin Yun-fei (28)	Chen Yen-yu (Note: Captain of the 33rd Chemical Warfare Group, Sixth Army Corps, Republic of China Army. He escaped the tragedy because he was on active duty.)	Tseng Pei-fan (34)	Chen Pei-chun (28)
Chen ○yu (1)	Chen ○sheng (6)	Chen ○fei (5)	Chen ○sheng (2)

== Suspect ==
Chen Yen-hsiang
- 陳彥翔
- Spouse: Tseng Pei-fan (died in the arson attack)
- Children: Two sons and one daughter (all died in the arson attack)
- Parent(s): Chen Ping-cheng (father); Lin Li-chun (mother, died in the arson attack)
- Motive: Domestic disputes over household chores and financial issues
- Criminal charge: Parricide
- Penalty: Life imprisonment

Chen Yen-hsiang, the younger son of the owner of the tire shop, graduated from an automotive repair vocational program. He was married and had three children—two sons and one daughter. He had prior convictions for fraud, theft, and property damage.

== Reactions ==
Following the incident, then-Hsinchu Mayor Lin Chih-chien, who had tested positive for COVID-19 and was in isolation, delegated then-Deputy Mayor Shen Hui-hung to visit the mourning hall and express condolences. Relatives of the eldest daughter-in-law demanded severe punishment for the perpetrator.

All eight victims suffered fourth-degree burns, and no autopsies were performed. Many members of the public brought flowers and candies to mourn the children who died in the fire.

Hsinchu County Magistrate Yang Wen-ke stated that the Hsinchu living circle “shares in the grief,” and extended condolence payments to the victims’ families.

== Trial ==
=== First instance ===
Chen was indicted for murder in August 2022. The Taiwan Hsinchu District Prosecutors Office described the crime as "utterly devoid of conscience and humanity" and requested the death penalty. On 28 September 2023, the Hsinchu District Court sentenced Chen Yen-hsiang to capital punishment (death penalty), lifetime disfranchisement (deprivation of civil rights for life), and ordered him to pay NT$11.86 million in compensation. The ruling was subject to appeal.

=== Appeal ===
On 11 January 2024, the Taiwan High Court began hearing the appeal. Chen displayed a poor attitude and remarked to the judges, "How would you know the severity of the injuries if you have never ignited gasoline?" Relatives of the deceased requested that the original death sentence be upheld.

At the second hearing on 7 March, Chen appeared calm. Two police body-camera videos were presented in court, which became key evidence in determining whether he could avoid execution.

At the third hearing on 25 April, Chen admitted to committing arson but denied murder and requested restorative justice proceedings. The Judicial panel scheduled three expert witnesses to testify on 24 July.

During closing arguments on 1 November, prosecutor Chan Chang-hui of the Taiwan High Prosecutors Office argued that Chen had acted with intent to commit arson and direct intent to kill. He emphasized that Chen had carefully planned the crime by obtaining a fuel container, purchasing gasoline, and deceiving gas station employees, and had knowingly endangered lives, including those of four children. Attorneys Lin Chun-hung, Chen Yu-fan, and Chen Chih-ning from the Legal Aid Foundation represented Chen. Chen Chih-ning argued that Chen had unintentionally dropped the burning tissue paper because it was "too hot," causing the tragedy rather than intentionally killing anyone. Attorney Chen Yu-fan cited Supreme Court Criminal Judgment No. 3146 of 2019 and argued that the first-instance court had erred by failing to grant sentence mitigation for voluntary surrender. She noted that police officers did not know who had started the fire when they arrived, and that Chen had told them, "I started the fire, hurry up."

On 11 December 2024, the High Court reviewed the evidence and found that Chen's pleas for officers to save his wife and children, expressions of remorse, and attempt to borrow a police officer's gun to commit suicide demonstrated genuine repentance. The court recognized his actions as voluntary surrender and commuted the sentence to life imprisonment. The case remained subject to appeal.

After the appellate ruling, the mother of Chen's sister-in-law and the two elder sisters of Chen's wife, accompanied by the Hsinchu branch of the Crime Victim Protection Association, stated that they could not accept the verdict. The mother issued an open letter titled "My child cried for help in the flames, but he looked on coldly", expressing her grief over her daughter's death and the loss of her eleven-month-old granddaughter. She argued that, since the Constitutional Court had ruled that capital punishment was constitutional, a crime that extinguished eight lives should warrant the death penalty; otherwise, she questioned the purpose of retaining capital punishment.

On 6 February 2025, the Supreme Court（Taiwan） dismissed the prosecution's appeal and upheld the Taiwan High Court's sentence of life imprisonment, making the ruling final. Because the first-instance death sentence had been reduced to life imprisonment on appeal, the case sparked public debate. Some relatives of the victims criticized the outcome and argued that the death penalty should have been maintained, while legal scholars and anti-death-penalty advocates contended that the ruling was consistent with the principle of sentence mitigation for voluntary surrender and was made in accordance with existing law.

== Aftermath ==
On 26 January 2025, the younger sister of Lin Yun-fei posted on the social media platform Threads, accusing her brother-in-law Chen Yen-yu of beginning a new romantic relationship only six months after her sister's death and remarrying after two years of dating. She criticized him for failing to show respect toward his deceased wife and her family, sparking widespread discussion and controversy online.

On 27 January, in response to the allegations, Chen Yen-yu's elder brother formally filed a criminal complaint against the younger sister for defamation and issued a nine-point statement on social media. He stated that some of the accusations had caused harm to the family and emphasized that he had never deleted posts related to his late wife and children, but had merely hidden them because he could not bear the pain of revisiting memories of his deceased loved ones.

In the statement, he apologized for the negative impression created by his previous social media posts, including the phrase "The rest of my life is you; it does not matter if you arrive late", and apologized to his late wife's family. He explained that the statement was intended to express gratitude to his current wife for accepting him during difficult times, rather than to disrespect his late wife. He further stated that he had cooperated in distributing insurance payouts and bank savings after the tragedy, but had continued to face repeated demands for money and emotional blackmail from his former mother-in-law.

Chen Yen-yu concluded by asking the public to stop excessive speculation and malicious rumors, emphasizing that both he and his father were victims of the tragedy and expressing his hope to rebuild his life, while reserving the right to pursue legal action against defamatory statements.

However, Lin Yun-fei's mother disputed these claims. In a Threads post on 28 January, she alleged that the Chen family had promised at the funeral hall to transfer all insurance proceeds to her family, but later reneged on the agreement, paying only NT$1.27 million while taking NT$2.48 million in insurance payments and NT$140,000 in savings. She further alleged that Chen Yen-yu's mother had borrowed NT$400,000 from Lin Yun-fei for stock investments and never repaid the debt, and that donations and condolence money received in her daughter's name had never been given to the maternal family. She criticized the Chen father and son as "heartless" and stated that she intended to file defamation charges against Chen Yen-yu over his public statements.
