= Chou Hung-hsu espionage case =

- Date: 9 March 2017 – 21 March 2019
- Location: Taiwan
- Participants: Chou Hung-hsu
- Outcome: Convicted of attempting to develop an organization for mainland Chinese authorities

The Chou Hung-hsu espionage case, also known as the Chou Hung-hsu Chinese spy case, was the first alleged mainland Chinese student espionage case investigated by the Taipei District Prosecutors Office in Taiwan. Chou Hung-hsu was accused of attempting to recruit an official of the Taiwanese Ministry of Foreign Affairs to provide intelligence, but the official instead reported the approach to authorities. Chou was arrested by the National Security Maintenance Division of the Ministry of Justice Investigation Bureau on 9 March 2017 and was placed in incommunicado detention beginning the following day. In May, the court approved a two-month extension of his detention and communication restrictions.

In January 2018, the Taipei District Prosecutors Office announced that its investigation had obtained twelve files of evidence, including materials related to the "Spark T Project," and additionally brought charges in what became known as the Wang Ping-chung case. All parties implicated in the contents denied the prosecution's allegations.

For attempting to recruit Taiwanese diplomatic personnel and establish an intelligence organization in Taiwan, the Supreme Court found Chou guilty and sentenced him to one year and two months in prison. In a separate case involving his alleged attempts to recruit Wang Ping-chung and other members of the New Party Youth Corps for intelligence activities, the court acquitted the defendants due to insufficient evidence.

Chou initially denied the charges. After four months of incommunicado detention, he confessed and pleaded guilty on 6 July 2017. Upon concluding its investigation, the Taipei District Prosecutors Office indicted him for violating the National Security Act and requested a reduced sentence based on his confession.

On the afternoon of 6 July 2017, Chou was transferred to the Taipei District Court on charges of "attempting to develop organizations for political or other official institutions in the Mainland Area" under the National Security Act. During court proceedings, Chou stated that "I feel that personnel from the Investigation Bureau took advantage of my desire for freedom to make me plead guilty." The judge rejected his argument, ruling that Chou had no family members in Taiwan and remained at risk of colluding with accomplices or witnesses or fleeing. He was ordered detained for three more months and prohibited from receiving visitors or communicating with others.

On 15 September 2017, the Taipei District Court declined to admit his courtroom confession, relying instead on statements made during his incommunicado detention, and sentenced him to one year and two months' imprisonment without suspension under the National Security Act. After sentencing, the presiding judge ordered the lifting of the communication restrictions imposed on Chou. Both Chou and the Taipei District Prosecutors Office appealed, and the case was transferred to the Taiwan High Court.

In March 2019, the Taiwanese Supreme Court upheld the second-instance sentence of one year and two months. The prosecutors' request to consolidate the case with allegations involving the recruitment of members of the New Party Youth Corps was rejected because the court considered the two cases to involve different patterns of conduct, leaving the latter to be investigated separately by the Taipei District Prosecutors Office. The Taiwanese Supreme Court also dismissed the appeals filed by both Chou and the prosecutors on the grounds that they merely disputed factual findings rather than raising legal issues. Because the time Chou had already spent in detention was equivalent to his sentence, the High Court released him under the supervision of his lawyer, subject to restrictions on leaving the country and changing residence, and required him to report to a police station daily.

On 28 April 2021, the Taiwan Taipei District Courtacquitted Chou Hung-hsu and five others, includingWang pingcun, although Chou remained subject to an exit ban. The verdict was appealable. On 13 May 2022, the Taiwan High Court upheld the acquittals of all five defendants at the second instance but extended Chou's travel restriction until 22 November 2022.

== Case developments ==
=== Incident ===
While studying in Taiwan, Chou Hung-hsu became acquainted with a young official from the Ministry of Foreign Affairs（Taiwan） of the Republic of China (Taiwan). Through WeChat, Chou repeatedly inquired whether the official was willing to join an "organization" and attempted to recruit him to deliver classified diplomatic information in Japan. In return, Chou allegedly offered a free trip to Japan and an unspecified amount of U.S. dollars. In February 2017, Chou entered Taiwan under the identity of a director of "Taiwan Yongming International Company" and met with the official in person, but the official reported the approach to the authorities.

=== Arrest ===
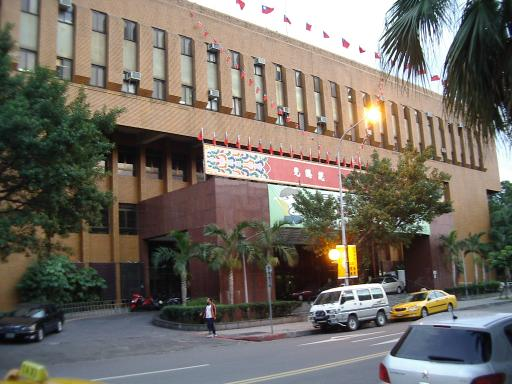
Taiwan Taipei District Court and Taiwan Taipei District Prosecutors Office

On 9 March 2017, the Taipei District Prosecutors Office directed the National Security Division of the Ministry of Justice Investigation Bureau to search Chou's rented residence in Taipei. Investigators seized his mobile phone and laptop to examine communication records and arrested him. On 10 March, a judge ordered that he be held incommunicado.

On the same day Chou was detained, prosecutors notified the authorities in mainland China in accordance with the Cross-Strait Joint Crime-Fighting and Judicial Mutual Assistance Agreement. Chou was permitted to meet with legal counsel during his detention and was protected under Taiwanese law. Taiwanese media reported that Chou had "voluntarily declined legal representation" and described him as "very calm and composed" and "somewhat familiar with Taiwan's legal system."

On 11 April, Mainland Affairs Council Minister Katharine Chang held an international press conference and stated that the Taiwanese government had informed mainland Chinese authorities within 24 hours, but that Chou's family had not requested permission to visit him in Taiwan.

=== Indictment ===
The Taipei District Prosecutors Office indicted Chou for violating the National Security Act on charges of "attempting to develop organizations for political or other official institutions in the Mainland Area."

The maximum penalty under the National Security Act was five years' imprisonment. Considering that Chou had confessed during the investigation, prosecutors requested that the court reduce his sentence in accordance with relevant provisions.

=== Retraction of confession ===
On the afternoon of 6 July 2017, Chou and the case files were transferred to the Taipei District Court, where the case was assigned to Judge Lin Yen-cheng. After reviewing the files, the judge held a hearing at 4:30 p.m. Following more than an hour of proceedings, the judge concluded that there was strong suspicion of criminal conduct and that inconsistencies remained in Chou's statements. Since Chou had no household registration in Taiwan and posed a flight risk, the court ordered that he remain in incommunicado detention.

On 2 January 2018, the Taipei District Prosecutors Office filed additional charges against Chou based on the results of its investigation into the "Spark T Project," which prosecutors alleged had been directed by Chou.

=== Judgment and additional indictment ===
On 14 March 2019, after the Taiwnese supreme court dismissed Chou's appeal, the conviction from the first and second instances concerning his failed attempt to recruit a diplomatic official became final. He was sentenced to one year and two months' imprisonment for attempted organizational development under the National Security Act. However, because the time he had already spent in detention was equivalent to his sentence, he was not required to return to prison.

In April 2019, the Taipei District Prosecutors Office additionally indicted Chou in connection with allegations that he had attempted to recruit Wang Ping-chung.

On 28 April 2021, the Taipei District Court acquitted Chou Hung-hsu and five others, including Wang Ping-chung. The ruling remained subject to appeal. On 13 May 2022, the Taiwan High Court upheld the acquittal on second appeal.

=== Exit restrictions ===
Despite being acquitted in April 2021, Chou remained subject to restrictions on leaving Taiwan by air or sea. The restrictions were extended for two months until 22 July 2021, and in July the High Court ordered a further eight-month extension.

Chou subsequently petitioned for a constitutional interpretation, arguing that the restrictions violated his right to freedom of residence and movement. On 10 September, the Justices of the Constitutional Court declined to hear the case, ruling that the petition failed to satisfy procedural requirements.

On 13 May 2022, the Taiwanese Supreme Court again extended Chou's exit ban until 22 November 2022.

== Related events ==
=== Protection and Security Act ===
After six months of drafting by the Ministry of Justice and the Investigation Bureau, the Republic of China's first proposed Protection and Security Work Act was completed on 9 January 2017. On 8 March 2017, provisions of the draft law were leaked ahead of its formal introduction.

=== Mainland Chinese education authorities urging caution over studying in Taiwan ===
Education bureaus in some counties and districts in mainland China instructed schools to individually notify students admitted to Taiwanese universities that "the current cross-strait situation is severe, complicated, and sensitive, and we hope that you will carefully reconsider your decision to study at Taiwanese institutions." Pi Tzu-an, Director-General of the Department of International and Cross-Strait Education of Taiwan's Ministry of Education, stated that the information mainly originated from provinces such as Fujian and Jiangsu, but said that the measures appeared to be actions taken by individual provinces, municipalities, or schools rather than directives issued by the central government of mainland China.

=== Lee Ming-che case ===
One week after Chou Hung-hsu was placed in incommunicado detention, the Lee Ming-che case occurred. Some commentators viewed the incident as a strong response by the mainland Chinese government to the Chou Hung-hsu case. On 30 March 2017, Taiwanese political commentator Tang Hsiang-lung wrote in an opinion piece for NOWnews that "Lee Ming-che will probably remain in mainland China for some time. How long? That depends first on how long Chou Hung-hsu is kept in detention in Taiwan."
