= High court (Taiwan) =

Intermediate appellate courts of Taiwan

High courts in Taiwan

Chinese name
- Chinese: 高等法院
Transcriptions
Standard Mandarin
- Hanyu Pinyin: Gāoděng Fǎyuàn
- Bopomofo: ㄍㄠ ㄉㄥˇ ㄈㄚˇ ㄩㄢˋ
- Wade–Giles: Kao^{1}-têng^{3} Fa^{3}-yüan^{4}
Hakka
- Romanization: Kô-tén Fap-yen
Southern Min
- Hokkien POJ: Ko-téng Hoat-īⁿ
- Tâi-lô: Ko-tíng Huat-īnn

Japanese name
- Kanji: 高等法院
- Kana: こうとうほういん
Transcriptions
- Romanization: Kōtō Hōin

The high courts (Chinese: 高等法院; pinyin: Gāoděng Fǎyuàn; Pe̍h-ōe-jī: Ko-téng Hoat-īⁿ) are the intermediate appellate courts under the law of Taiwan. The modern court system of Taiwan was founded in 1896, under the Japanese era. Currently there are six high courts and branches in Taiwan.

== History ==
In 1896, the High Court of the Government-General of Taiwan (臺灣總督府高等法院, Taiwan Sōtokufu Kōtō Hōin) was established in Taihoku. This was the supreme court of Taiwan in the Japanese era. Note that the Empire of Japan was granted extraterritoriality in China from late 19th century until World War II. This also handled the trial cases appealed from Taihoku District court (臺北地方法院) regarding Japanese citizens (including Taiwanese and Korean) in the Chinese provinces of Fujian, Guangdong and Yunnan.

After World War II, the Taiwan High Court was established under the Judicial Yuan, with more high court branches being established for the increasing population. In July 2010 three judges of the Taiwan High Court were detained on suspicion of accepting bribes in connection with the court's acquittal of a former legislator. The President of the Judicial Yuan, Lai In-jaw, and the President of the High Court resigned. The following year the Legislative Yuan passed the Judges Act, which introduced external evaluation of judges.

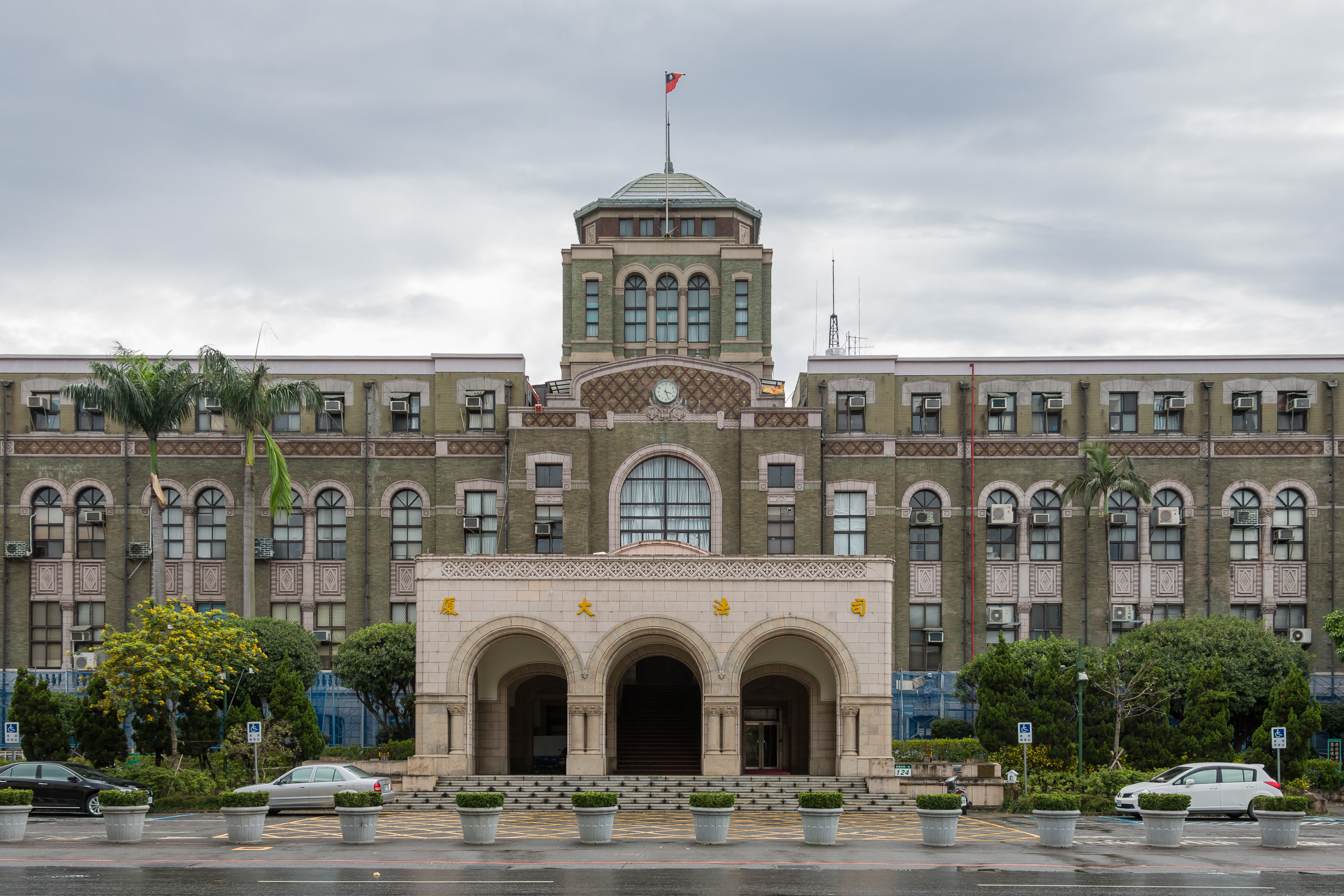
Building of the High Court of the Government-General of Taiwan, today the Judicial Yuan Building. The building houses the Judicial Yuan, Taiwan High Court, and Taiwan High Prosecutors Office

== List of high courts ==
No.	Name	Chinese	Jurisdiction	
No.	Name	Chinese	District courts	Administrative divisions
1	Taiwan High Court	臺灣高等法院	Hsinchu, Keelung, New Taipei, Shilin, Taipei, Taoyuan, Yilan	Hsinchu city/county, Keelung, New Taipei, Taipei, Taoyuan, Yilan
2	Taiwan High Court Taichung Branch Court	臺灣高等法院臺中分院	Changhua, Miaoli, Nantou, Taichung	Changhua, Miaoli, Nantou, Taichung
3	Taiwan High Court Tainan Branch Court	臺灣高等法院臺南分院	Chiayi, Tainan, Yunlin	Chiayi city/county, Tainan, Yunlin
4	Taiwan High Court Kaohsiung Branch Court	臺灣高等法院高雄分院	Ciaotou, Kaohsiung, Kaohsiung Juvenile and Family, Penghu, Pingtung	Kaohsiung, Penghu, Pingtung
5	Taiwan High Court Hualien Branch Court	臺灣高等法院花蓮分院	Hualien	Hualien
5	Taitung Court	臺東庭	Taitung	Taitung
6	Fuchien High Court Kinmen Branch Court	福建高等法院金門分院	Kinmen	Kinmen
6	Lienchiang Circuit Court	連江巡迴法庭	Lienchiang	Lienchiang (Matsu)

== Jurisdiction ==
The high courts and its branches exercise jurisdiction over the following cases:

- Appeals from judgments of the district courts or their branches as courts of the first instance in ordinary proceedings of civil and criminal cases;
- Interlocutory appeals from rulings of the district courts or their branches in ordinary proceedings;
- First instance criminal cases relating to rebellion, treason, and offenses against friendly relations with foreign states;
- Military appellate cases whose judgments are imprisonment for a definite period rendered by the high military courts and their branches; and
- Other cases prescribed by law.

The high courts and its branch courts are divided into civil, criminal and specialized divisions. Each division is composed of one division chief judge and two associate judges. Additionally, each high court and its branch courts have a clerical bureau, which is headed by a chief clerk who assists the president with administrative affairs.

Cases before the high courts or its branch courts are heard and decided by a panel of three judges. However, one of the judges may conduct preparatory proceedings.

The court has seven civil courts, each of which has one presiding judge and three judges to handle civil appeals of the second instance and counter-appeal cases under the system of collegial panels, but they do not deal with simple litigation. The Court has eleven criminal courts, each of which has one presiding judge and two or three judges to handle criminal appeals of the second instance and counter-appeal cases under the system of collegial panels as well as litigation of the first instance concerning civil strife, foreign aggression or violation of foreign relations. Based on various needs, the court manages several professional courts such as the Professional Court of Fair Trade Cases, Family Professional Court, Professional Court of International Trade, Maritime Professional Court, Professional Court of State Compensation, Professional Court of Anti-corruption, Professional Court of Intellectual Property Rights, Professional Court of Juvenile Delinquency, Professional Court of Serious Criminal Cases, Professional Court of Public Security, Professional Court of Fair Trade Act, Professional Court of Sexual Harassment, etc.

== See also ==
- History of law in Taiwan
- Constitution of the Republic of China
- Supreme Court of the Republic of China
- Ministry of Justice (Taiwan)
- Supreme Prosecutors Office
- Taiwan High Prosecutors Office
- List of law schools in Taiwan

== Gallery ==
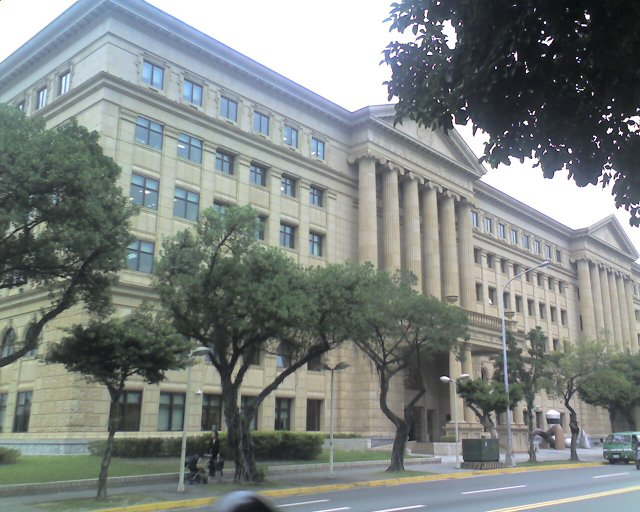
Taiwan High Court

Taiwan High Court Taichung Branch Court

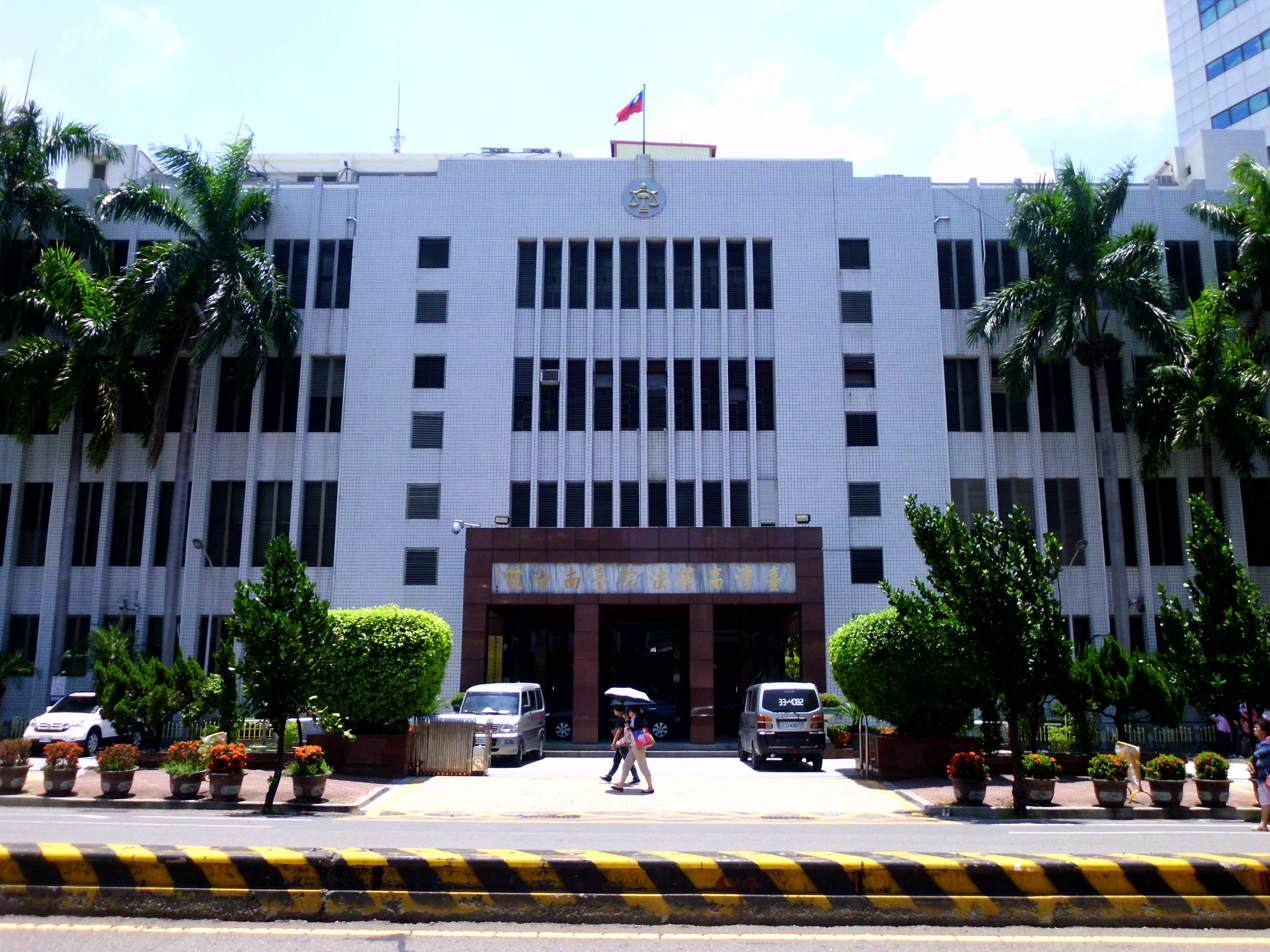
Taiwan High Court Tainan Branch Court

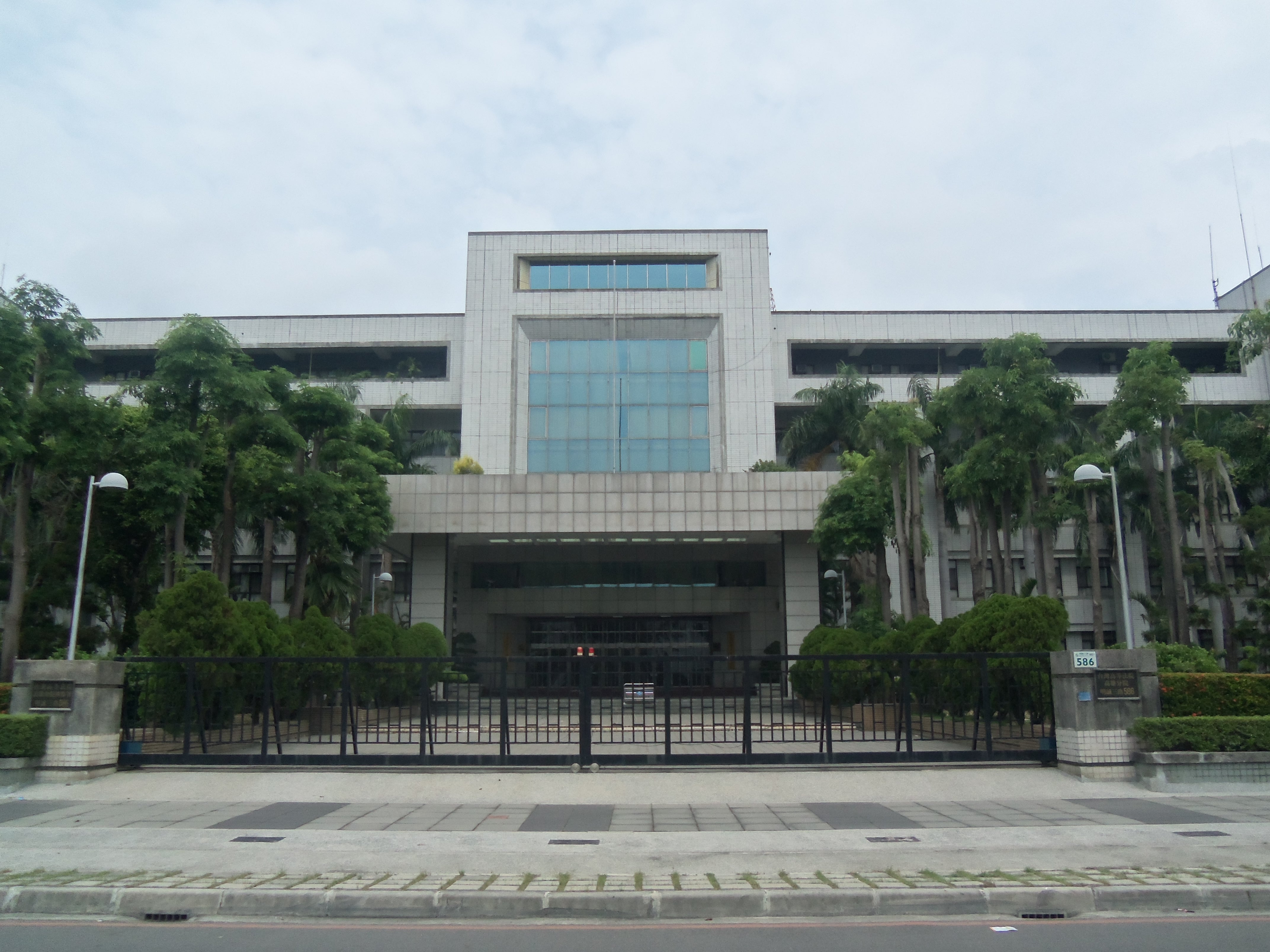
Taiwan High Court Kaohsiung Branch Court
