= Government-General of Taiwan =

Government of Taiwan under Japanese rule

- 臺灣總督府; Taiwan Sōtokufu (Japanese); Tâi-oân Chóng-tok-hú (Taiwanese)
- Seal of the Government-General

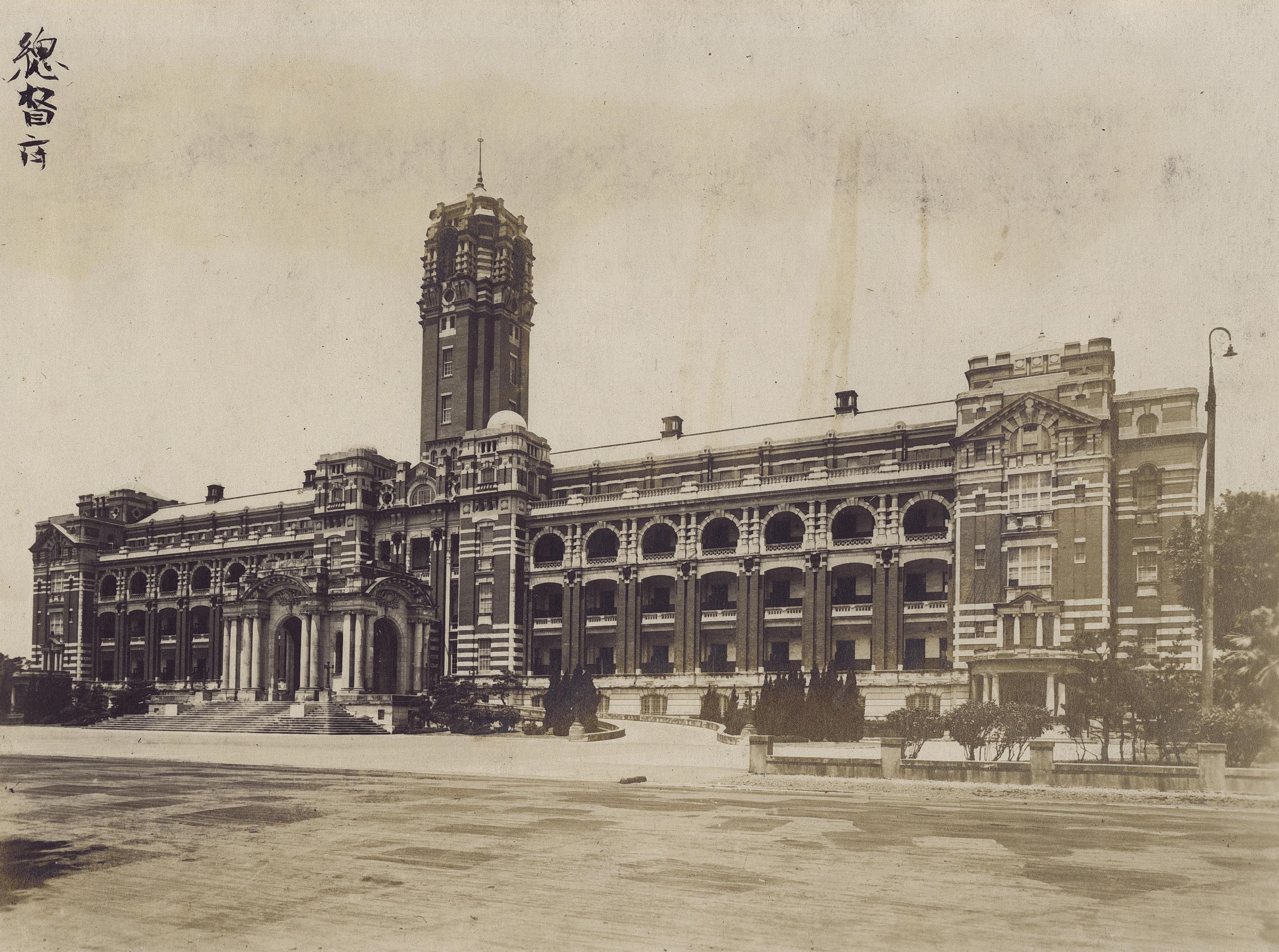

Agency overview
- Formed: 8 May 1895
- Preceding agency: Fukien-Taiwan Provincial Administration, Qing Empire
- Dissolved: 25 October 1945
- Superseding agency: Taiwan Provincial Government
- Headquarters: 1 Chōme, Bunbu Chō, Taihoku, Taihoku Prefecture, Japanese Taiwan (臺北州臺北市文武町一丁目)
- Agency executive: Governor-General of Taiwan
- Key document: Constitution of the Empire of Japan

Footnotes
- Sometimes also translated to Government of Taiwan, Taiwan Government. The western name Formosa was also used occasionally.

Government of Taiwan

Chinese name
- Traditional Chinese: 臺灣總督府
Transcriptions
Hakka
- Pha̍k-fa-sṳ: Thòi-vân Chúng-tuk-fú
Southern Min
- Hokkien POJ: Tâi-oân Chóng-tok-hú
- Tâi-lô: Tâi-uân Tsóng-tok-hú

Japanese name
- Kana: たいわんそうとくふ
- Kyūjitai: 臺灣總督府
- Shinjitai: 台湾総督府
Transcriptions
- Romanization: Taiwan Sōtokufu

The Government-General of Taiwan (Government of Taiwan, Taiwan Government, Government of Formosa, Japanese: 台湾総督府, Kyūjitai: 臺灣總督府, Hepburn: Taiwan Sōtokufu; Pe̍h-ōe-jī: Tâi-oân Chóng-tok-hú; Tâi-lô: Tâi-uân Tsóng-tok-hú; Pha̍k-fa-sṳ=Thòi-vân Chúng-tuk-fú) was the government that governed Taiwan under Japanese rule between 1895 and 1945.

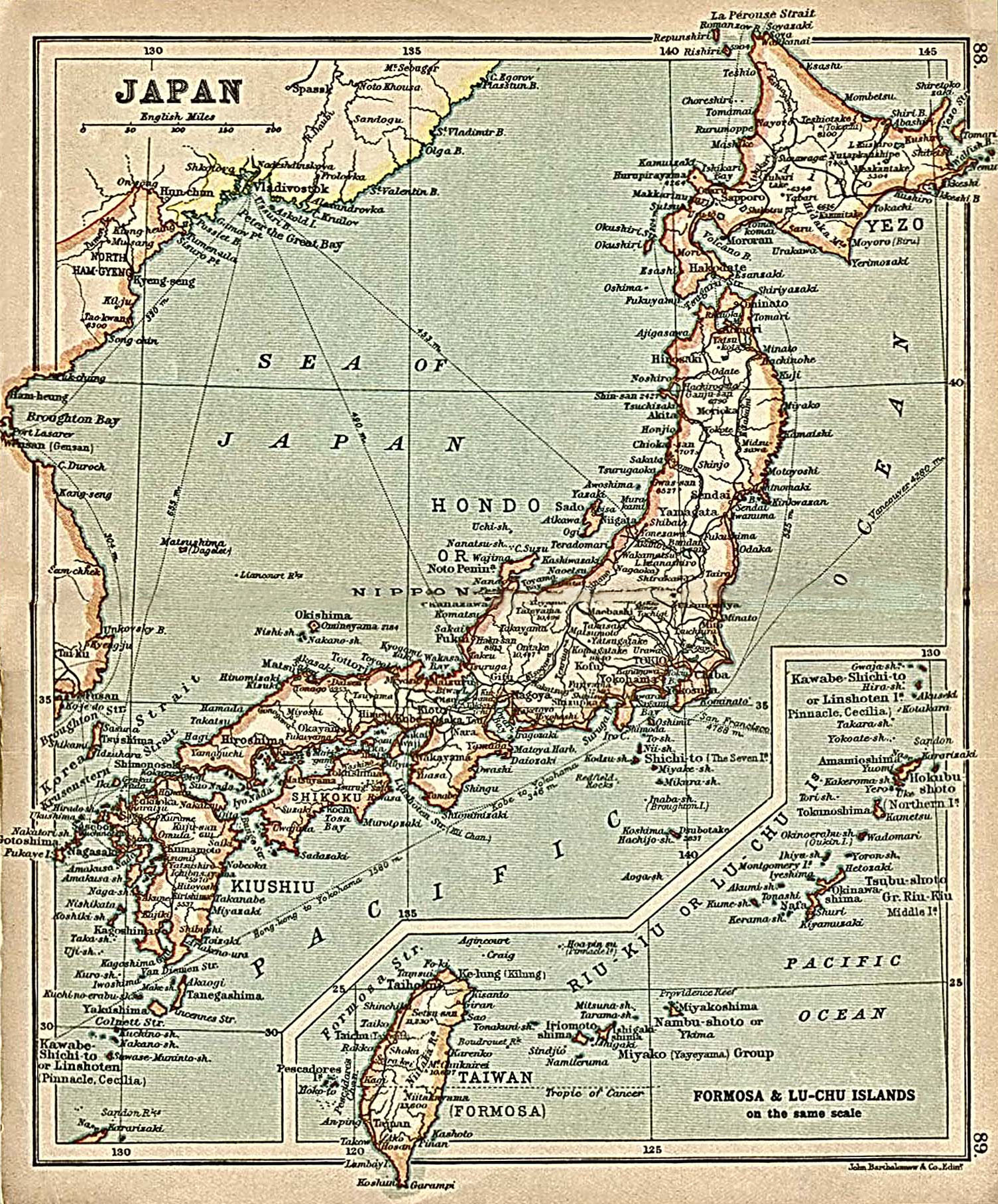
A 1911 map of Japan, including Taiwan, with mixed Japanese and Chinese place names

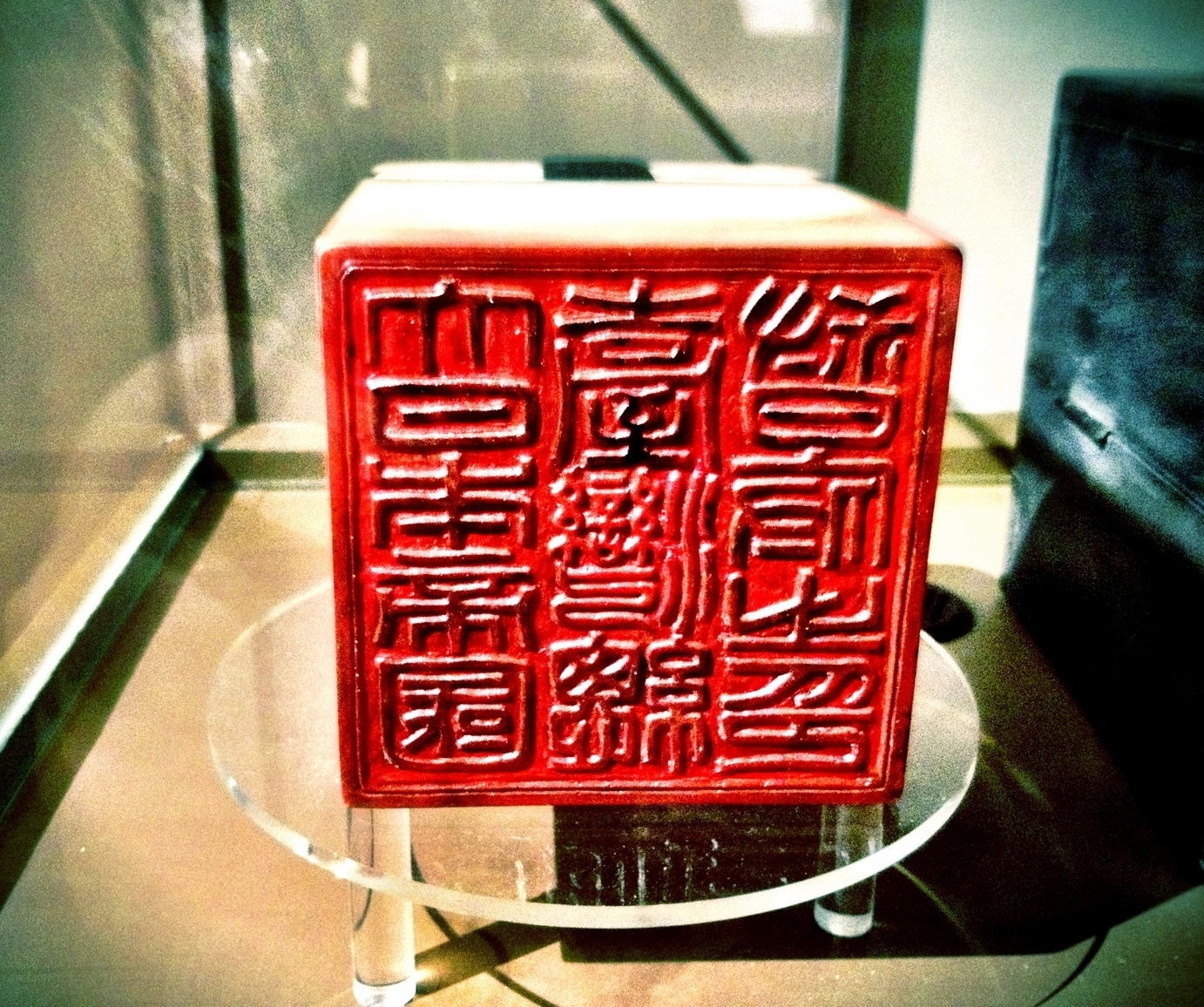
Official Seal of the Government-General of Taiwan, Empire of Japan (大日本帝國臺灣總督府之印)

== History ==
The Government-General of Taiwan was founded on May 10, 1895, two days after the Treaty of Shimonoseki was enforced. It started to rule Taiwan since June 17, 1895 after the Japanese forces took over Taiwan. On August 15, 1945, with the surrender of Japan, the organizations of Government-General was transformed to the newly established Taiwan Provincial Government and Taiwan Garrison Command. The transformation was completed on February 20, 1946.

== Organization and structure ==
=== Governor-General ===
The Governor-General of Taiwan (Japanese: 臺灣總督, Hepburn: Taiwan Sōtoku, Pe̍h-ōe-jī: Tâi-oân Chóng-tok) was the ruler of Taiwan in the Japanese era. The Governor-General was supervised by the Prime Minister of Japan, and then by the Minister of Home Affairs and the Minister of Colonial Affairs. The Governor-General exercised executive, legislative, and judicial powers in Taiwan. The Governor-General was also the commander of the Mixed Brigade of Taiwan Defense until it reorganized to the Taiwan Army under the Imperial Japanese Army in 1919

=== Chief of General Affairs ===
The Chief of General Affairs (Japanese: 總務長官, Hepburn: Sōmu Chōkan, Pe̍h-ōe-jī: Chóng-bū Tiúⁿ-koaⁿ), named Chief of Civil Affairs (Japanese: 民政長官, Hepburn: Minsei Chōkan, Pe̍h-ōe-jī: Bîn-chèng Tiúⁿ-koaⁿ) before 1919, was the primary executor of the policy in Taiwan, and the second most powerful official after the Governor-General.

=== Internal Departments ===
In 1895, the Government-General was founded with three departments: Department of Civil Affairs, Department of Army, Department of Navy. The military departments are to prepare the warfare with the rebellions in Taiwan. The Departments of Army and Navy were soon merged into Department of Military Affairs in 1896. With the Civil-Military divide in the 1910s, the Department of Military Affairs were reorganized as the Taiwan Army Command under Imperial Japanese Army. All bureaus under the Department of Civil Affairs became independents departments under the Government-General, and the Chief of Civil Affairs (then Chief of General Affairs) became a role similar to a head of Government.

At the end of Japanese rule, the Government-General had the following organs.

Structure of the Government-General in 1945
Name	Kanji	Japanese	Taiwanese
Secretariat to the Governor-General	總督官房	Sōtoku Kanbō	Chóng-tok Koaⁿ-pâng
Department of Education	文教局	Bunkyō Kyoku	Bûn-kàu Kio̍k
Department of Finance	財務局	Zaimu Kyoku	Châi-bū Kio̍k
Department of Mines and Industry	礦工局	Kōkō Kyoku	Khòng-kong Kio̍k
Department of Agriculture and Commerce	農商局	Nōshō Kyoku	Lông-siong Kio̍k
Department of Police	警務局	Keimu Kyoku	Kéng-bū Kio̍k
Bureau of Foreign Affairs	外事部	Gaiji Bu	Gōa-sū Pō͘
Bureau of Judicial Affairs	法務部	Hōmu Bu	Hoat-bū Pō͘

=== External Departments ===
There is a large number of external departments of the Government-General. Notable departments are

- Courts
  - Taiwan High Court and 5 District Courts (Taihoku, Shinchiku, Taichū, Tainan, Takao)
  - Taiwan High Prosecutors Office and 5 prosecutors offices in the district courts
- Department of Transportation
  - Railway Bureau
  - Communications Bureau (for postal and telecommunications)
- Monopoly Bureau (for opium, salt, camphor, liquor and tobacco)
- Port Bureau
  - Takao Port Authority
  - Kīrun Port Authority
- Higher Education
  - Taihoku Imperial University
  - Taihoku College of Commerce
  - Taihoku College of Technology
  - Taihoku College
  - Taichū College of Agriculture
  - Tainan College of Technology
- Imperial Taiwan Library
- Governmental Hospital
- Shintō shrines
  - Taiwan Grand Shrine

=== Local government ===
In 1945, Taiwan was divided to 8 prefectures. They are: Taihoku Prefecture, Shinchiku Prefecture, Taichū Prefecture, Tainan Prefecture, Takao Prefecture, Karenkō Prefecture, Taitō Prefecture, and Hōko Prefecture. The prefectures are further divided into 11 cities, 52 districts, and 2 subprefectures.

== Governmental buildings ==
After the Treaty of Shimonoseki was enforced from May 8, 1895, the Empire of Japan started to rule Taiwan. In the early years, the Government-General was seated in the former Fukien-Taiwan Provincial Administration Hall build by the Qing Empire in 1892.

The new governmental building was planned in 1907 by the 5th Governor-General Sakuma Samata. Construction began on June 1, 1912, and was completed on March 31, 1919, at a cost of 2.8 million Japanese yen. The new building of the Government-General, now named Presidential Office Building, is still being used as the office of the President of the Republic of China after World War II.

The residence of the Governor-General of Taiwan is known today as Taipei Guest House.

== See also ==
- History of Taiwan
- Timeline of Taiwanese history
- Political divisions of Taiwan (1895–1945)
