= History of law in Taiwan =

The history of law in Taiwan extends from Aboriginal Taiwanese law, which was influenced by ancestor worship and the authority of tribal chiefs, to the establishment of the present-day Republic of China in 1945. Taiwanese law was influenced by the Dutch during their rule over the region via the United East Indian Company (1624–1662), while Chinese legal practices had a significant role in influencing the legal system overall: first, with the rule of Koxinga (1662–1683) in the first ethnic Han state in Taiwan; followed by the Qing dynasty (1683–1895) and the influence of Confucianism; and ending with the establishment of the Republic of China (1945–present). Between the Qing dynasty and the Republic of China, Japan also influenced the laws of Taiwan during the Japanese occupation of Taiwan (1895–1945).

== Aboriginal Law (pre-1624) ==
The earliest majority inhabitants of Taiwan were probably from Southeast Asia and are racially similar to the Malay group who inhabit Malaysia and Indonesia. Other minority groups to inhabit Taiwan during this time were the Han Chinese, Japanese traders, European explorers, missionaries, and other traders.

One origin of law of Aboriginal peoples came from a concept of chongzu (Chinese: 崇祖), or ancestral worship. Ancestral spirits were believed to exist forever and co-exist among the living. It was thought that violating customs or taboo would possibly result in some sort of catastrophe and would require subsequent prayer to the ancestors to avoid such a catastrophe from happening again. Breaking the law was thought to have the result of multiple levels of trouble for you or your family.

Criminal Law at this time took on the philosophy of “an eye for an eye”. Another important aspect was the concept that traditional customs, no matter what the content, were accepted as normal. Most laws and customs were passed by word of mouth. Tribes had a chief that was elected or chosen by bloodline, and he was considered the local leader and representative to foreign tribes. Penalties for unlawful acts were separated into non-property related penalties (ex. bodily harm) and property related penalties. Non-property related crimes would result in corporal punishment such as caning. Property related crimes would result in compensation. The leader of the tribe was the arbitrator to disputes.

== Dutch Rule (1624-1662) ==
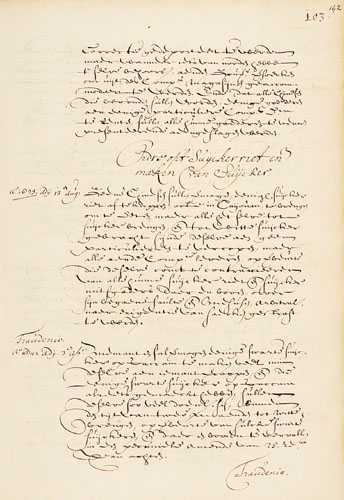
Dutch law in Taiwan under Dutch Colonialism c. 17th century

From 1624 to 1662, the Dutch ruled Taiwan under the auspices of the United East Indian Company (Vereenigde Oost-Indische Compagnie or VOC in Dutch). The VOC was a trading company established in 1602 with the authority of the States General of the Netherlands to carry out colonial activities in Asia. During this time, the Governor was the head of government and was empowered to legislate, collect taxes, wage war, and declare peace on behalf of the VOC and, by extension, the Dutch state. Because the VOC was given diplomatic, administrative, judicial, and other functions of sovereignty, the Dutch legally exercised control over Taiwan.

During their rule, the Dutch made serious efforts in the development of Taiwan. They established laws concerning aspects of life such as the levying of import and export tariffs, the sale of lands, the construction of houses, the organization of markets, the production of alcohol and sugar, gambling, and the granting of permission to enter and live in Aboriginal settlements.

The Dutch claimed they governed the whole island and created an administration and infrastructure that facilitated mostly commerce. They introduced land management and cultivation schemes, as well as zoning, and required a 10 percent tax on all production within their zones. They issued hunting licenses and taxed the subsequent catch. They also required a tax for certain staples. The Dutch established a Court of Justice in the southern town of Tainan. The Dutch colonists maintained a concept of legal dualism. If the case involved Europeans, then Dutch law would take effect. If the case involved Aboriginals, Aboriginal law would take effect. If the case involved Han, then the customs of the Han people would take effect.

== Koxinga (1662-1683) ==
The Kingdom of Tungning (東寧) was argued to be the first Han Chinese government to rule Taiwan. It was ruled by Zheng Chenggong (鄭成功, bearing the honorific title Koxinga), a child of Chinese and Japanese parents, between 1661 and 1683 after the defeat of the Dutch. The government at the time had a Chinese legal system, a court, scholars, and advisors, and was similar to a Ming Dynasty government. During this period, Taiwan society absorbed the legal and political system of imperial China, along with the Confucian educational and philosophy systems.

Although Confucian literati made up only a small portion of Taiwan Society, Confucianism had profoundly found its way into Taiwanese Society. Traditionally, power was in the hands of the father or grandfather with regards to disciplinary matters, marriage, and property. There was also a strict division between government officials and citizens, between elders and the young, between husbands and wives, and between masters and servants, etc. During this military occupation of Taiwan, the Aboriginals were still able to use their own law.

== Qing Dynasty (1683-1895) ==
From 1683 to 1895, Taiwan was loosely ruled by the Qing administration of China. Initially, Taiwan was a prefecture of the Fukien province and after 1886, Taiwan became a province of China. The Great Qing Legal Code or Qing Code (大清律例), local customs, and unofficial sources of law in imperial China were the source of law in Taiwan during this time. In 1875, because of the Qing Empire’s desire to fortify Aboriginal areas (including eastern Taiwan), the Qing government repealed the restrictive policies towards Taiwan.

The first governor of Taiwan (1884–91) Mr. Liu Mingchuan, considered a national hero by many Taiwanese, made important reforms and improvements to the infrastructure of Taiwan. He set forth important tax and fiscal reforms and provided competent rule. In 1891, he was recalled by Beijing and retired. It has been debated by scholars just how much effective control the Qing Chinese had and wanted to have; furthermore, it has been debated whether Beijing considered Taiwan under its jurisdiction. For instance, in 1867, Taiwanese Aboriginals killed a crew of shipwrecked Americans, and Beijing responded by saying that Aboriginal lands were not under the jurisdiction of China. In addition, popular uprisings were common. Some scholars estimate there were as many as eighty-five uprisings during the Qing rule.

Dispute resolution in Taiwan at this time was similar to the Chinese legal tradition, with unofficial resolution preferable to official court adjudication. The Chinese administration was largely ineffective in settling disputes, and corrupt officials usually found cases in favour of whoever bribed them most successfully. Conciliation was presided over by relatives or local notables, and only after conciliation failed would a magistrate hear the dispute, so locals were largely governing their own affairs.

== Japanese rule (1895-1945) ==
Qing China was defeated in the First Sino-Japanese War (1894–95) and Japan took over control of Taiwan and the Penghu islands. The process, however, was not smooth, and Taiwan desperately resisted the Japanese occupation: this resistance influenced the initial legislative institutions in Taiwan. The Government-General of Taiwan was created by an imperial ordinance known as the Organic Regulations of the Government-General of Formosa (ORGG). This ordinance gave the Governor-General of Taiwan a rank similar to a Premier or Chief Justice of the Supreme Court in Tokyo. Among their powers were the power to control general political affairs, the power to command the military and naval forces, and the power to handle judicial affairs.

In March 1896, the Imperial Diet (Japan’s legislature, 帝國議会 Teikoku-gikai, currently the National Diet of Japan 国会 Kokkai) enacted the Law Relating to Laws and Ordinances to Be Enforced in Taiwan (Title 63, or Law 63). This law gave the Governor-General the power to issue ordinances (ritsurei) that had the same effect as Japanese law. Title 63 was extended every three years (article 6) until 1906 when it came under pressure from the public about its constitutionality. The law was often attacked in the Diet as illegal because it gave the Government General law-making power, not the Diet. As a result, in 1906, Title 63 was revised under Title 31, which restricted the powers of the Governor-General. These changes had little real effect and were revised further in 1921 under Title 3. Under Title 3, the power to issue ritsurei was restricted by the exception principle in Article 1. In theory, the effective law in Taiwan would increasingly be covered by Japanese Law.

Sources of law during this time for Patent Law, Copyright Law, Trademark Law, Criminal Procedure, Civil Code, Commercial Laws, Civil Procedure, and Maritime Laws were from Japanese Law. Organic Regulations of Law Courts and Criminal Law were governed by ritsurei. This time period also marked a steady incorporation of Western law into Taiwanese law.

== Republic of China (1945-present) ==
=== The Transition of the Legal Systems, 1945-49 ===
The Republic of China (ROC) legal system took effect in Taiwan on 25 October 1945, after most Japanese laws were repealed on 25 October 1946.

=== Martial Law State, 1949-87 ===
The ROC central government, headed by the Kuomintang (KMT) political party, moved to Taiwan in December 1949, followed by a large number of Chinese immigrants who eventually accounted for about 13 percent of Taiwan’s entire population. Taiwan and China have had distinct legal systems, but after this migration these distinctions have become even more pronounced. The “Statute for Agriculture, Mining, Industry and Commerce During the Extraordinary Period” (1938) and the "Temporary Provisions Effective During the Period of General National Mobilization for the Suppression of Communist Rebellion" (1942) gave authorities the power to control resources, as well as establish political control over freedom of news, speech, press, communication, assembly and association during wartime.

=== Democratization of Law, 1987-present ===
The government terminated Martial Law in 1987, and the Period of National Mobilization officially came to an end on 1 May 1991. With various constraints of the constitution lifted, legal reforms proceeded rapidly, along with the continued incorporation of Western legal concepts into ROC Law.

== See also ==
- Constitution of the Taiwan (ROC)
- Six Codes
- Law of the Taiwan (ROC)
- Law schools in Taiwan
- Ministry of Justice (Taiwan)
- Judicial Yuan
- Supreme Court of the Taiwan (ROC)
- Supreme Prosecutor Office
- Taiwan High Prosecutors Office
- District Courts of the Taiwan (ROC)
- Referendums in Taiwan
- Democracy Index
  - Modified Sainte-Laguë method with 234 seats or more
  - Open list PR
  - Unicameralism
  - Jury trial with 12
  - Judicial review
  - Bill of Rights
  - Separation of church and state
  - Separation of investment and retail banking
  - Corruption Perceptions Index
