= Law of Taiwan =

Overview of the law of the Republic of China

The law of the Republic of China as applied in Taiwan, Penghu, Kinmen, and Matsu is based on civil law with its origins in the modern Japanese and German legal systems. The main body of laws are codified into the Six Codes:

| No. | Name | Traditional Chinese | Taiwanese Hokkien romanization | Hakka romanization | Bopomofo |
|---|---|---|---|---|---|
| 1 | Constitution | 憲法 | Hiàn-hoat | Hién-fap | ㄒㄧㄢˋ ㄈㄚˇ |
| 2 | Civil Code | 民法 | Bîn-hoat | Mìn-fap | ㄇㄧㄣˊ ㄈㄚˇ |
| 3 | Code of Civil Procedure | 民事訴訟法 | Bîn-sū Sò͘-siōng-hoat | Mìn-sṳ Su-siung-fap | ㄇㄧㄣˊ ㄕˋ ㄙㄨˋ ㄙㄨㄥˋ ㄈㄚˇ |
| 4 | Criminal Code | 刑法 | Hêng-hoat | Hìn-fap | ㄒㄧㄥˊ ㄈㄚˇ |
| 5 | Code of Criminal Procedure | 刑事訴訟法 | Hêng-sū Sò͘-siōng-hoat | Hìn-sṳ Su-siung-fap | ㄒㄧㄥˊ ㄕˋ ㄙㄨˋ ㄙㄨㄥˋ ㄈㄚˇ |
| 6 | Administrative Laws | 行政法規 | Hêng-chèng Hoat-kui | Hàng-chṳn Fap-kûi | ㄒㄧㄥˊ ㄓㄥˋ ㄈㄚˇ ㄍㄨㄟ |

Laws are promulgated by the President after being passed by the Legislative Yuan; the enforcement rules of laws issued by the competent authority under the Executive Yuan designated by the legislation.

== Historical background ==
=== Taiwan under Japanese rule ===
After Taiwan ceded to Japan in 1895, the Civil Code of Japan was created in 1896. It was heavily influenced by the first draft of the German Civil Code and the French Civil Code. The code is divided into five books. Those on family and succession retain certain vestiges of the old patriarchal family system that was the basis of Japanese feudalism. It was in these sections that most of the postwar revisions were made. At that time it was considered no longer necessary or desirable to pay such homage to the past, and the sections dealing with family law and succession were brought closer to European civil law. This law was applied to Taiwan.

During Japanese rule, the court in the modern sense, which means the judicial power is independent from the administrative power, was created for the first time in Taiwanese history.

=== Codification of Republic of China Law ===
After the Kuomintang consolidated its rule over China in Northern Expedition, the Nationalist government succeeded in codifying all the major civil, criminal, and commercial laws of China: the Criminal Code (1928), the Code of Criminal Procedure (1928), the Civil Code (1929), the Code of Civil Procedure (1929), the Insurance Law (1929), the Company Law (1929), the Maritime Law (1929), the Negotiable Instruments Law (1929), Bankruptcy Law (1935), and the Trademark Law (1936). The laws enacted by the Kuomintang were largely based on drafts formed during the late Qing dynasty. At the end of Qing Dynasty, the government recruited some Japanese law experts to draft the law for China. Tokyo High Court judge Yoshimasa Matsuoka (松岡 義正; 1870-1939) has drafted the first 3 Chapters (General Provision, Law of Obligation Law of Real Property) of the Civil Code, as well as the Code for Civil Procedure, for the Qing Empire. Professor Koutarou Shida (志田 鉀太郎; 1868-1951) drafted the Commercial Law. However, before these draft bills being enacted, the Qing dynasty was overthrown, with China descending into warlordism for the ensuing decade.

In the area of constitutional law, the Taiwan uses the 2005 Additional Articles which amend the original 1947 Constitution. Significant changes have been made to take into account the fact that the Government of the Republic of China only controls Taiwan and surrounding islands since the 1950s.

=== The transition of legal systems (1945–1949) ===
The ROC legal system took effect in Taiwan on 25 October 1945, after most Japanese laws were repealed on 25 October 1946.

=== Martial law (1949–1987) ===
The Kuomintang-headed ROC central government moved to Taiwan in December 1949 followed by a large number of Chinese immigrants who eventually accounted for about 13 percent of Taiwan's entire population. The “Statute for Agriculture, Mining, Industry and Commerce During the Extraordinary Period” (1938) and the "Temporary Provisions Effective During the Period of General National Mobilization for the Suppression of Communist Rebellion" (1948) gave authorities the power to control resources, as well as establish political control over freedom of news, speech, press, communication, assembly and association during wartime.

=== Democratization (from 1987) ===
The Kuomintang finally terminated Martial Law in 1987 and the Period of National Mobilization officially came to an end on 1 May 1991. With various constraints of the constitution lifted, legal reforms proceeded rapidly, along with the continued incorporation of western legal concepts being integrated into ROC Law.

== Government ==
=== President ===
Articles 35–52 of the Constitution of the Republic of China and Article 2 of the Additional Articles of the Constitution of the Republic of China state that the President shall be directly elected by the entire populace of the free area of the Republic of China, and may hold office for no more than two consecutive four-year terms (Article 2 of the Additional Articles). The President represents the country in its foreign relations (Article 35). The President also has command of the armed forces (Article 36); promulgates laws and mandates (Article 37); may make a declaration of martial law with the approval of, or subject to confirmation by, the Legislative Yuan (Article 39); may appoint and remove civil servants and military officers (Article 41); may confer honors and decorations (Article 42); may grant amnesties and pardons, remission of sentences, and restitution of civil rights (Article 40); as well as conclude treaties and declarations of war and cease-fire (Article 38). According to the Additional Articles of the Constitution of the Republic of China, the President may issue emergency orders and take all necessary measures to avert imminent danger affecting the security of the State or of the people or to cope with any serious financial or economic crisis. The President may declare the dissolution of the Legislative Yuan after consulting with its president.

=== The Executive Yuan ===
Articles 53–61 of the Constitution of the Republic of China and Article 3 of the Additional Articles of the Constitution of the Republic of China state that the Executive Yuan shall be the highest administrative organ of the state (Article 53), and have a president (usually referred to as the premier), a vice president (vice premier), a number of ministers and chairpersons of commissions or councils, and several ministers without portfolio (Article 54). The premier is appointed by the President of the Republic with the consent of the Legislative Yuan (Article 55). The vice premier, ministers, and chairpersons are appointed by the President on the recommendation of the premier (Article 56).

=== The Legislative Yuan ===
Articles 62–76 of the Constitution of the Republic of China and Article 4 of the Additional Articles of the Constitution of the Republic of China state that the Legislative Yuan shall be the highest legislative organ of this Country, and exercises legislative power on behalf of the people (Article 62). Beginning with the Seventh Legislative Yuan, the Legislative Yuan shall have 113 members (Additional Article 4). The members of the Legislative Yuan shall serve a term of four years, which is renewable after re-election (Additional Article 4). According to Article 4 of the Additional Articles of the Constitution of the Republic of China, the distribution of the Legislative seats is as follows:

1. Seventy-three members shall be elected from the Special Municipalities, counties, and cities in the free area. At least one member shall be elected from each county or city. Members for the seats shall be elected in proportion to the population of each Special Municipality, county, or city, which shall be divided into electoral constituencies equal in number with the members to be elected;
2. Three members each shall be elected from among the lowland and highland aborigines in the free area;
3. A total of 34 members shall be elected from the nationwide constituency and among citizens residing abroad. The Legislative Yuan has a president and a vice president, elected by and from among its members (Article 66).

The functions of the Legislative Yuan are: to decide by resolution statutory or budgetary bills or bills concerning martial law, amnesty, declaration of war, conclusion of peace or treaties, and other important affairs of the state (Article 63); to propose to amend the Constitution (Article 12 of the Additional Articles), change the nation's territorial boundaries (Article 2 of the Additional Articles), or impeach the President or Vice President (Article 2 of the Additional Articles).

=== The Judicial Yuan ===
Articles 77–82 of the Constitution and Article 5 of the Additional Articles of the Constitution state that The Judicial Yuan shall be the highest judicial organ of the state (Article 77). The Judicial Yuan is in charge of the courts at all levels, the Administrative Court, and the Committee on the Discipline of Public Functionaries. It is responsible for the adjudication of civil, criminal, and administrative cases, as well as the discipline of civil servants (Article 77).

The Judicial Yuan shall have 15 grand justices (Additional Article 5). The 15 grand justices, including a president and a vice president of the Judicial Yuan to be selected from amongst them, shall be nominated and, with the consent of the Legislative Yuan, appointed by the President of the Republic. Each grand justice of the Judicial Yuan shall serve a term of eight years and shall not serve a consecutive term (Additional Article 5). The grand justices interpret the Constitution and unify the interpretation of laws and orders (Article 78). They also form a constitutional tribunal to adjudicate matters relating to the impeachment of the President or the Vice President, and the dissolution of political parties violating constitutional provisions (Additional Article 5).

=== The Examination Yuan ===
Articles 83–89 of the Constitution of the Republic of China and Article 6 of the Additional Articles of the Constitution of the Republic of China state that the Examination Yuan shall have charge of matters relating to the examination, employment, and management of all civil servants of the state (Article 83). The Examination Yuan oversees all examination-related matters such as qualification screening, tenure, pecuniary aid in case of death, and the retirement of civil servants, as well as all legal matters pertaining to the employment, discharge, performance evaluations, scale of salaries, promotions, transfers, commendations, and rewards for civil servants (Additional Article 6). *some articles were amended or cease to apply

==== The Control Yuan ====
Articles 90–106* of the Constitution of the Republic of China and Article 7 of the Additional Articles of the Constitution of the Republic of China state that the Control Yuan shall exercise the powers of impeachment, censure, and audit (Additional Article 7). It has 29 members, including a president and a vice president, all of whom shall serve a term of six years and are nominated and appointed by the President of the ROC with the consent of the Legislative Yuan (Additional Article 7). The Control Yuan has a Ministry of Audit, headed by an auditor-general who is nominated and appointed, with the consent of the Legislative Yuan, by the President of the Republic for a six-year term (Article 104). *some articles were amended or cease to apply

== Judicial system ==
=== Court system ===
Distinction is made between the common court and the administrative court. The common court is in charge of the civil and criminal cases, while the administrative court in charge of administrative cases. There are therefore two supreme courts: the normal Supreme Court, and the Administrative Supreme Court.

==== District Courts ====
There are currently 21 District Courts in Taiwan. 19 of them are located on the island of Taiwan: the District Court of Taipei, New Taipei, Shihlin, Taoyuan, Hsinchu, Miaoli, Taichung, Nantou, Changhua, Yunlin, Chiayi, Tainan, Kaohsiung, Pingtung, Taitung, Hualien, Yilan, Keelung, Penghu; and 2 are located in Fuchien: Kinmen and Lienchiang.

Each District Court may establish one or more summary divisions for the adjudication of cases suitable for summary judgments. The civil summary procedure is for the amount or the value of object of not more than NT$300,000 and for other simple legal disputes. Currently, there are a total of forty-five such divisions in Taiwan.

Each of the District Courts has civil, criminal and summary divisions and may establish specialized divisions to handle cases involving juveniles, family, traffic, and labor matters as well as motions to set aside rulings on violations of the Statute for the Maintenance of Social Order. Each division has a Division Chief Judge who supervises and assigns the business of the division. Each District Court has a Public Defenders' Office and a Probation Officers' Office.

A single judge hears and decides cases in ordinary and summary proceedings as well as in small claims cases. A panel of three judges decides cases of great importance in ordinary proceedings as well as appeals or interlocutory appeals from the summary and small claims proceedings. Criminal cases are decided by a panel of three judges, with the exception of summary proceedings which may be held by a single judge. The Juvenile Court hears and decides only cases involving juveniles.

==== High Courts ====
There are two High Courts in the Republic of China, the Taiwan High Court (臺灣高等法院) and the Fuchien High Court (福建高等法院). The Taiwan High Court has four branches in Taichung, Tainan, Kaohsiung, and Hualien. The Fuchien High Court is not established, except for its branch in Kinmen, so in effect the Kinmen branch is directly subordinate to the Judicial Yuan.

The High Courts and High Court branches exercise jurisdiction over the following cases:

1. Appeals from judgments of the District Courts or their branches as courts of the first instance in ordinary proceedings of civil and criminal cases;
2. Interlocutory appeals from rulings of the District Courts or their branches in ordinary proceedings;
3. First instance criminal cases relating to rebellion, treason, and offenses against friendly relations with foreign states;
4. Military appellate cases whose judgments are imprisonment for a definite period rendered by the High Military Courts and their branches; and
5. Other cases prescribed by law.

Each High Court or High Court branch has jurisdiction over the following District Courts:

- Taiwan High Court: Taipei, Shihlin, New Taipei, Yilan, Taoyuan, Hsinchu
- Taiwan High Court, Taichung branch: Miaoli, Taichung, Nantou, Changhua
- Taiwan High Court, Tainan branch: Yunlin, Chiayi, Tainan
- Taiwan High Court, Kaohsiung branch: Kaohsiung, Pingtung, Penghu, Kaohsiung Juvenile Court
- Taiwan High Court, Hualien branch: Hualien, Taichung
- Fuchien High Court, Kinmen branch: Kinmen, Lienchiang

Though the Taiwan High Court has administrative oversight over its four branches, it does not have appellate jurisdiction over them. Instead, the Taiwan High Court and its four branches have appellate jurisdiction over separate sets of District Courts, as listed above.

The High Courts and its Branch Courts are divided into civil, criminal and specialized divisions. Each Division is composed of one Division Chief Judge and two Associate Judges. Additionally, the High Court and its Branch Courts have a Clerical Bureau, which is headed by a Chief Clerk who assists the President with administrative affairs.

Cases before the High Courts or its Branch Courts are heard and decided by a panel of three judges. However, one of the judges may conduct preparatory proceedings.

The Court has seven civil courts, each of which has one presiding judge and three judges to handle civil appeals of the second instance and counter-appeal cases under the system of collegial panels, but they do not deal with simple litigation. The Court has eleven criminal courts, each of which has one presiding judge and two or three judges to handle criminal appeals of the second instance and counter-appeal cases under the system of collegial panels as well as litigation of the first instance concerning civil strife, foreign aggression or violation of foreign relations. Based on various needs, the Court manages several professional courts such as the Professional Court of Fair Trade Cases, Family Professional Court, Professional Court of International Trade, Maritime Professional Court, Professional Court of State Compensation, Professional Court of Anti-corruption, Professional Court of Intellectual Property Rights, Professional Court of Juvenile Delinquency, Professional Court of Serious Criminal Cases, Professional Court of Public Security, Professional Court of Fair Trade Act, Professional Court of Sexual Harassment, etc.

==== Supreme Court ====
The Supreme Court is located in Taipei. The Court is the court of last resort for civil and criminal cases. Except for civil cases involving amounts not exceeding NT $1,500,000 and petty offences enumerated in Article 376 of the Code of Criminal Procedure, any civil or criminal case may be appealed to the Court. This Court exercises jurisdiction over the following cases:

1. appeals from judgments of High Courts or their branches as courts of first instance in criminal cases;
2. appeals from judgments of High Courts or their branches as courts of second instance in civil and criminal cases;
3. appeals from rulings of High Courts or their branches;
4. appeals from judgments or rulings rendered by the civil court of second instance by the summary procedure, the amounts in controversy exceeding NT $1,500,000, and with permission granted in accordance with specified provisions;
5. civil and criminal retrials within the jurisdiction of the court of third instance;
6. extraordinary appeals; or
7. any other case as specified by laws.

==== Administrative Courts ====
The current administrative litigation system adopts a "Two Level Two Instance System" litigation procedure. The administrative courts are classified into the High Administrative Court, which is the court of first instance, and the Supreme Administrative Court, which is the appellate court. The first instance of the High Administrative Court is a trial of facts. The Supreme Administrative Court is an appellate court.

==== Specialized courts ====
The Taiwan Kaohsiung Juvenile Court (臺灣高雄少年法院), established in accordance with the Law Governing the Disposition of Juvenile Cases, handles juvenile cases that would otherwise be handled by the Taiwan Kaohsiung District Court. Other District Courts do not have this division. Like appeals from the Kaohsiung District Court, appeals from the Juvenile Court are heard by the Taiwan High Court, Kaohsiung Branch.

The Intellectual Property Court (智慧財產法院), located in Taipei, was established on 1 July 2008, has jurisdiction over intellectual property cases. It hears:

1. Civil cases involving intellectual property, at both trial and appeal;
2. Appeals of criminal cases involving intellectual property from the District Courts;
3. Administrative cases involving intellectual property, at trial.

=== Judges ===
Article 80 of the Constitution states that Judges shall be above partisanship and shall, in accordance with law, hold trials independently, free from any interference. Furthermore, Article 81 states that Judges shall hold office for life. No judge shall be removed from office unless he has been guilty of a criminal offense or subjected to disciplinary measure, or declared to be under interdiction. No judge shall, except in accordance with law, be suspended or transferred or have his salary reduced. Judges shall be appointed from those persons who have passed the Examination of Judicial Officials, completed the Training Course for Judicial Officials and possessed distinguished records after a term of practice.

=== Council of Grand Justices or Justices of the Constitutional Court ===
The Justices of the Constitutional Court shall provide rulings on the following four categories of cases:

1. Interpretation of the Constitution;
2. Uniform Interpretation of Statutes and Regulations;
3. Impeachment of President and Vice President of the Republic of China; and
4. Declaring the dissolution of political parties in violation of the Constitution.

=== Prosecutors ===
According to the Law Governing the Organization of the Court, prosecutors’ offices form part of the court at the same level of trial: the Supreme Court has a prosecutors’ office with a number of prosecutors, of whom one is appointed as Prosecutor-General; each of the other High Courts or District Courts had its own prosecutors’ office with a number of prosecutors, of whom one is appointed as the chief prosecutor. According to the Law Governing the Organization of the Court and the Statute Governing Judicial Personnel Administration, the qualifications of prosecutors are identical to that of judges. Both of them possess the status of judicial officials. Prosecutors shall be appointed from those persons who have passed the Examination of Judicial Officials, completed the Training Course for Judicial Officials and possessed distinguished records after a term of practice.

=== Sources of law — Precedents ===
Since Taiwan uses Civil Law, precedents have a very different legal effect from common law jurisdictions such as in the United States or other Anglo-American legal systems, as specified in Article 80 of the Constitution. Some Supreme Court decisions may go through a screening process and selected as a precedent, bearing significant meaning for future cases.

=== The Constitution and Human rights ===
The ROC Constitution was adopted on 25 December 1946, by the National Assembly convened in Nanjing. It was promulgated by the National Government on 1 January 1947, and put into effect on December 25 of the same year. In addition to the preamble, the Constitution comprises 175 articles in 14 chapters. In essence the Constitution embodies the ideal of "sovereignty of the people," guarantees human rights and freedoms, provides for a central government with five branches and a local self-government system, ensures a balanced division of powers between the central and local governments, and stipulates fundamental national policies.

==== The preamble of the Constitution ====
The National Assembly of the Republic of China, by virtue of the mandate received from the whole body of citizens, in accordance with the teachings bequeathed by Dr. Sun Yat-sen in founding the Republic of China, and in order to consolidate the authority of the State, safeguard the rights of the people, ensure social tranquility, and promote the welfare of the people, do hereby establish this Constitution, to be promulgated throughout the country for faithful and perpetual observance by all.

==== Basic rights guaranteed by the Constitution ====
The Constitution states that the Republic of China, founded on the Three Principles of the People, shall be a democratic republic of the people, to be governed by the people and for the people and the sovereignty of the Republic of China shall reside in the whole body of citizens (Articles 1–2).

The Constitution also states that the people shall have freedom of residence and of change of residence, freedom of speech, teaching, writing and publication, freedom of privacy of correspondence, freedom of religious belief, and freedom of assembly and association (Articles 10–14). The Constitution further states that the people shall have the right of existence, the right to work and the right of property, the right of presenting petitions, lodging complaints, or instituting legal proceedings, the right of election, recall, initiative and referendum, and the right of taking public examinations and of holding public offices (Articles 15–18). The people shall have the duty of paying taxes in accordance with law, the duty of performing military service in accordance with law, and have the right and the duty of receiving citizens' education (Articles 19–21).

==== Legal relations between Taiwan and China under the Constitution ====
Article 11 of the Additional Articles of the Constitution of the Republic of China states that the rights and obligations between the people of the Chinese area and those of the free area, and the disposition of other related affairs may be specified by law.

==== Referendum ====
Article 1 of the Additional Articles of the Constitution of the Republic of China states that the electors of the free area of the Republic of China shall cast ballots at a referendum within three months of the expiration of a six-month period following the public announcement of a proposal passed by the Legislative Yuan on the amendment of the Constitution or alteration of the national territory.

=== Administrative law ===
==== Principles ====
The Administrative Procedure Act is enacted to ensure that all administrative acts are carried out in pursuance of a fair, open and democratic process based on the principle of administration by law so as to protect the rights and interest of the people, enhance administrative efficiency and further the people's reliance on administration. Administrative procedure means the procedure to be followed by administrative authorities in performing such acts as rendering administrative dispositions, entering into administrative contracts, establishing legal orders and administrative rules, deciding on administrative plans, employing administrative guidance and dealing with petitions. Administrative authority is an organization representing the State, any local self-governing body or any other subject of administration with an independent legal status, in declaration of its intention and carrying on public affairs. An individual or entity commissioned to exercise public authority shall be deemed to be an administrative authority within the scope of commission (Articles 1–2).

==== Transparency ====
All information held or kept in custody by an administrative authority shall in principle be made public but may be restricted in exceptional cases, and the disclosure of and restrictions on information shall, unless as herein prescribed, be separately provided by law (Article 44).

=== Civil Code ===
The Civil Code is the basic law for most private relations between persons. It is divided into five parts:

Part I: General Principles Part II: Debts Part III: Property Part IV: Family Part V: Succession

==== General principles ====
The Civil Code states that if there is no applicable act for a civil case, the case shall be decided according to customs. If there is no such custom, the case shall be decided according to jurisprudence. The legal capacity of a person commences from the moment of live birth and terminates at death. Maturity is attained upon reaching the twentieth year of age, and a minor, who has not reached their seventh year of age, has no capacity to make juridical acts. A minor who is over seven years of age has limited capacity to make juridical acts. A married minor has the capacity to make juridical acts. A juridical person is established only according to this code or any other acts. A juridical act which is against public policy or morals is void.

==== Contracts ====
The expression of intent of a person who has no capacity to make juridical acts is void. An expression is also void which is made by a person who, though not without capacity to make juridical acts, in a condition of unconsciousness or mental disorder. A person who has no capacity to make juridical acts shall be represented by his guardian for making or receiving an expression of intent. The making or receiving of an expression of intent of a person who is limited in capacity to make juridical acts must be approved by his guardian, except when the expression of intent relates to the pure acquisition of a legal advantage, or to the necessaries of life according to his age and status. A unilateral act made by a person limited in capacity to make juridical acts without the approval of his guardian is void. A contract made by a person limited in capacity to make juridical acts without the approval of his guardian is valid upon the acknowledgement of the guardian. Before the acknowledgement of the contract made by a person who is limited in capacity to make juridical acts, the other party to the contract may withdraw it, except he knew that the approval of the guardian had not been given, when the contract was made.

An expression of intent which an agent makes in the name of the principal within the scope of his delegated power takes effect directly to the principal. If an expression of intent which is required to be made to the principal is made to his agent, the provision of the preceding paragraph shall be mutatis mutandis applied.

An expression of intent inter presents becomes effective at the moment when the person to whom it is made understands it well. An expression of intent inter absents becomes effective at the moment when the notification of the expression reaches such other party, except when the withdrawal of the notification previously or simultaneously reaches such other party. The fact that after the notification of the expression the expresser dies, or becomes unable to make juridical acts, or is limited in capacity to make juridical acts, shall not null the expression of intent. In the interpretation of an expression of intent, the real intention of the parties must be sought rather than the literal meaning of the words. A person who offers to make a contract shall be bound by his offer except at the time of offer he has excluded this obligation or except it may be presumed from the circumstances or from the nature of the affair that he did not intend to be bound. Exposing goods for sale with their selling price shall be deemed to be an offer. However, the sending of pricelists is not deemed to be an offer. An offer ceases to be binding if it is refused. An offer made inter presentes ceases to be binding if it is not accepted at once .An acceptance which arrives late, except under the circumstances in the preceding article, shall be deemed to be a new offer.

An acceptance with amplifications, limitations or other alterations shall be deemed to be a refusal of the original offer and the making of a new offer. In cases where according to customs or owing to the nature of the affair, a notice of acceptance is not necessary, the contract shall be constituted when, within a reasonable time, there is a fact, which may be considered as an acceptance of the offer. If a notice of withdrawing an offer arrives after the arrival of the offer itself, though it should usually arrive before or simultaneously with the arrival of the offer within a reasonable time by its transmitting manner, and this might be known to the other party, the other party so notified should notify the offerer immediately of such delay.

When the parties have reciprocally declared their concordant intent, either expressly or impliedly, a contract shall be constituted. If the parties agree on all the essential elements of the contract but have expressed no intent as to the non-essential elements, the contract shall be presumed to be constituted. In the absence of an agreement on the above-mentioned non-essential elements, the court shall decide them according to the nature of the affair. When one of the parties to a contract receives earnest money from the other, the contract is presumed to be constituted.

The debtor shall be responsible for his acts, whether intentional or negligent. The extent of responsibility for one's negligence varies with the particular nature of the affair; but such responsibility shall be lessened, if the affair is not intended to procure interests to the debtor. If there is change of circumstances which is not predictable then after the constitution of the contract, and if the performance of the original obligation arising therefrom will become obviously unfair, the party may apply to the court for increasing or reducing his payment, or altering the original obligation. If according to the nature of the contract or the expression of intent of the parties, the purpose of the contract can not be accomplished if not performed within the fixed period, and if one of the parties does not perform the contract within that period, the other party may rescind the contract without giving the notice specified in the preceding article. Unless otherwise provided by the act or by the contract, a person who is bound to make compensation for an injury shall restore the injured party to the status quo before the injury. If the restoration of the status quo ante shall be paid in money, interest shall be added from the time of the injury.

==== Torts ====
If a person has wrongfully damaged to the body, health, reputation, liberty, credit, privacy or chastity of another, or to another's personality in a severe way, the injured person may claim a reasonable compensation in money even if such injury is not a purely pecuniary loss. If it was reputation that has been damaged, the injured person may also claim the taking of proper measures for the rehabilitation of his reputation. A person who, intentionally or negligently, has wrongfully damaged the rights of another is bound to compensate him for any injury arising therefrom. The same rule shall be applied when the injury is done intentionally in a manner against the rules of morals. A person, who violates a statutory provision enacted for the protection of others and therefore prejudice to others, is bound to compensate for the injury, except no negligence in his act can be proved. If several persons have wrongfully damaged the rights of another jointly, they are jointly liable for the injury arising therefrom. The same rule shall be applied even if which one has actually caused the injury cannot be sure. Instigators and accomplices are deemed to be joint tortfeasors.

An official, who has intentionally committed a breach of duty which he ought to exercise in favor of a third party and therefore prejudice to such third party, is liable for any injury arising therefrom. If the breach is the result of this official's negligence, he may be held liable to compensate only in so far as the injured person is unable to obtain compensation by other means. In the case mentioned in the preceding sentence, if the injured person who may obviate the injury by making use of a legal remedy has intentionally or negligently omitted to make use of it, the official shall not be liable to compensate for the injury.

A person of no capacity or limited in capacity to make juridical acts, who has wrongfully damaged the rights of another, shall be jointly liable with his guardian for any injury arising therefrom if he is capable of discernment at the time of committing such an act. If he is incapable of discernment at the time of committing the act, his guardian alone shall be liable for such injury. In the case of the preceding sentence, the guardian is not liable if there is no negligence in his duty of supervision, or if the injury would have been occasioned notwithstanding the exercise of reasonable supervision. If compensation cannot be obtained according to the provisions of the preceding two sentences, the court may, on the application of the injured person, take the financial conditions among the tortfeasors, the guardian and the injured person into consideration, and order the tortfeasors or his guardian to compensate for a part or the whole of the injury.

The employer shall be jointly liable to make compensation for any injury which the employee has wrongfully caused to the rights of another in the performance of his duties. However, the employer is not liable for the injury if he has exercised reasonable care in the selection of the employee, and in the supervision of the performance of his duties, or if the injury would have been occasioned notwithstanding the exercise of such reasonable care. If compensation cannot be obtained according to the provision of the preceding sentence, the court may, on the application of the injured person, take the financial conditions of the employer and the injured person into consideration, and order the employer to compensate for a part or the whole of the injury. The employer who has made compensation as specified in the preceding sentence may claim for reimbursement against the employee committed the wrongful act.

If injury is caused by an animal, the possessor is bound to compensate the injured person for any injury arising therefrom, unless reasonable care in keeping according to the species and nature of the animal has been exercised, or unless the injury would have been occasioned notwithstanding the exercise of such reasonable care. The possessor may claim for reimbursement against the third party, who has excited or provoked the animal, or against the possessor of another animal which has caused the excitement or provocation.

The injury, which is caused by a building or other work on privately owned land, shall be compensated by the owner of such building or work, unless there is no defective construction or insufficient maintenance in such building or work, or the injury was not caused by the defectiveness or insufficiency, or the owner has exercised reasonable care to prevent such injury. In the case of the preceding sentence, if there is another person who shall be responsible for the injury, the owner making compensation may make a claim for reimbursement against such person.

The manufacturer is liable for the injury to another arising from the common use or consumption of his merchandise, unless there is no defectiveness in the production, manufacture, process, or design of the merchandise, or the injury is not caused by the defectiveness, or the manufacturer has exercised reasonable care to prevent the injury. The manufacturer mentioned in the preceding sentence is the person who produces, manufactures, or processes the merchandise. Those, who attach the merchandise with the service mark, or other characters, signs to the extent enough to show it was produced, manufactured, or processed by them, shall be deemed to be the manufacturer. If the production, manufacture, process, or design of the merchandise is inconsistent with the contents of its manual or advertisement, it is deemed to be defective. The importer shall be as liable for the injury as the manufacturer.

If an automobile, motorcycle or other motor vehicles which need not to be driven on tracks in use has caused the injury to another, the driver shall be liable for the injury arising therefrom, unless he has exercised reasonable care to prevent the injury.

The person, who runs a particular business or does other work or activity, shall be liable for the injury to another if the nature of the work or activity, or the implement or manner used might damage to another. Except the injury was not caused by the work or activity, or by the implement or manner used, or he has exercised reasonable care to prevent the injury.

Unless otherwise provided by the act or by the contract, the compensation shall be limited to the injury actually suffered and the interests which have been lost. Interests which could have been normally expected are deemed to be the interests which have been lost, according to the ordinary course of things, the decided projects, equipment, or other particular circumstances. A person who has wrongfully caused the death of another shall also be bound to make compensation for the injury to any person incurring the medical expenses, increasing the need in living, or incurring the funeral expenses. If the deceased was statutorily bound to furnish maintenance to a third party, the tortfeasor shall also make compensation to such third party for any injury arising therefrom. In case of death caused by a wrongful act, the father, mother, sons, daughters and spouse of the deceased may claim for a reasonable compensation in money even if such injury is not a purely pecuniary loss.

=== Civil Procedure ===
The Civil Procedure Law has its origin in the Draft of Civil Code of Qing Empire (大清民事訴訟律草案), which was drafted by a Japanese Judge Yoshimasa Matsuoka (松岡義正, 1870–1939). In early era of Republic of China, the Peking government has its own Code of Civil Procedure (民事訴訟條例), which was drafted on the basis of the Draft of Qing Empire, with some modification made by Chinese scholars studied in Japan. As a result, the Civil Procedure Law in Formosa (Taiwan) is a mixture of Japanese law and German law. Some of its provisions has its origin in German Zivilprozessordnung.

A defendant may be sued in the court for the place of the defendant's domicile or, when that court cannot exercise jurisdiction, in the court for the place of defendant's residence. A defendant may also be sued in the court for the place of defendant's residence for a claim arising from transactions or occurrences taking place within the jurisdiction of that court. Where a defendant has no place of domicile in the R.O.C., or where the defendant's place of domicile is unknown, then the defendant's place of residence in the R.O.C. shall be deemed to be the defendant's place of domicile. Where the defendant has no place of residence in the R.O.C. and where the defendant's place of residence is unknown, then the defendant's last place of domicile in the R.O.C. shall be deemed to be the defendant's place of domicile. Where an R.O.C. citizen is located in a foreign nation and enjoys immunity from the jurisdiction of such foreign nation, and when he/she cannot be sued in a court in accordance with the provisions of the two preceding paragraphs, then the place where the central government is located shall be deemed to be the place of domicile of such citizen.

The fundamental goal of civil trials is to solve disputes over private rights so as to protect these rights. Civil litigation is based on the adversary system. A presiding judge directs the proceedings and exercises the right of elucidation to allow the parties concerned to make proper and sufficient debates. Furthermore, the judge examines evidence in detail and makes fair decisions. Meanwhile, the court shall try, by all possible means, to expand the function of compromises and reconciliation to reduce the sources of litigation.

The court has a certain number of civil divisions that deal with civil cases related to disputes over private rights or specified in other special laws or ordinances, as well as non-contentious matters.

Cases involving controversies over marriage, parent-children relations, declaration of death, interdiction, and non-contentious matters including property management, inheritance, adoption, and acknowledgement of children, are handled by the Family Division.

Only an attorney may act as an advocate, except where the presiding judge permits a person who is not an attorney to act as an advocate. The presiding judge may by a ruling, at any time revoke the permission provided in the preceding paragraph. The notification of such revocation shall be served upon the principal of the retention. The Judicial Yuan shall prescribe the regulations governing permission of a person who is not an attorney to act as an advocate.

A party bears the burden of proof with regard to the facts which he/she alleges in his/her favor, except either where the law provides otherwise or where the circumstances render it manifestly unfair.

=== Intellectual Property ===
==== Copyright Law ====
For the purposes of the Copyright Act, "works" shall include the following:

1. 1. Oral and literary works.
2. Musical works.
3. Dramatic and choreographic works.
4. Artistic works.
5. Photographic works.
6. Pictorial and graphical works.
7. Audiovisual works.
8. Sound recordings.
9. Architectural works.
10. Computer programs.

The examples and content of each category of works set forth in the preceding paragraph shall be prescribed by the competent authority.

Protection for copyright that has been obtained in accordance with this Act shall only extend to the expression of the work in question, and shall not extend to the work's underlying ideas, procedures, production processes, systems, methods of operation, concepts, principles, or discoveries.

Except as otherwise provided in this Act, economic rights endure for the life of the author and fifty years after the author's death.

==== Trademark Law ====
A trademark may be composed of a word, design, symbol, color, sound, three-dimensional shape or a combination thereof. A trademark as defined above shall be distinctive enough for relevant consumers of the goods or services to recognize it as identification to those goods or services and to differentiate such goods or services from those offered by others.

Since the publication date of a registered trademark, trademark rights remaining for a term of ten years shall be bestowed upon a right holder.

==== Patent ====
The term "patent" referred to in this Act is classified into the following three categories:

1. Invention patents;
2. Utility model patents; and
3. Design patents.

The duration of a utility model patent right shall be ten (10) years from the filing date of the patent application.

The duration of a design patent right shall be twelve (12) years from the filing date of the patent application.

=== Criminal Procedure ===
In criminal trials, the major purposes are to discover facts, punish criminals, acquit the innocent, safeguard human rights, and to ensure the proper execution of the state's penalty power. When public prosecutors initiate public prosecutions on behalf of the state, or when victims file private prosecutions, the Criminal Division proceeds with open and fair trials in accordance with the principle of "no crime and punishment without law," and facts decided by evidence. In cases where the minimum punishment is not less than three years of imprisonment or the accused is financially unable to retain a lawyer, the court offers public defenders to protect the rights and interests of the accused.

Criminal proceedings may not be initiated and punishment may not be imposed other than in conformity with the procedure specified in this Code or in other laws.

Crimes committed by military personnel in active service, except those military offenses subject to court-martial, shall be prosecuted and punished in accordance with this Code.

Where the criminal proceedings of a case were conducted pursuant to special laws owing to limitation of time or region and no final judgment has yet been rendered thereon, upon elimination of said limitation, the case shall be prosecuted and punished in accordance with this Code.

A summons shall be issued for the appearance of an accused.

A summons shall contain the following matters:

1. Full name, sex, age, native place and domicile or residence of the accused;
2. Offense charged;
3. Date, time, and place for appearance;
4. That a warrant of arrest may be ordered if there is a failure to appear without good reason.

If the name of an accused is unknown or other circumstances make it necessary, special identifying marks or characteristics must be included; if the age, native place, domicile or residence of an accused is unknown, it does not need to be included.

A summons shall be signed by a public prosecutor during the stage of investigation or by a presiding or commissioned judge during the stage of trial.

Prior to a final conviction through trial, an accused is presumed to be innocent.

The facts of an offense shall be established by evidence. The facts of an offense shall not be established in the absence of evidence.

The public prosecutor shall bear the burden of proof as to the facts of the crime charged against an accused, and shall indicate the method of proof.

Prior to the first trial date, if it appears to the court that the method of proof indicated by the public prosecutor is obviously insufficient to establish the possibility that the accused is guilty, the court shall, by a ruling, notify the public prosecutor to make it up within a specified time period; if additional evidence is not presented within the specified time period, the court may dismiss the prosecution by a ruling.

Once the ruling on dismissing the prosecution becomes final, no prosecution can be initiated for the same case, unless one of the circumstances specified in the Items of Article 260 exists.

Judgment of "Case Not Established" shall be pronounced if prosecution has been re-initiated in violation of the provision of the preceding paragraph.

After a witness, or an expert witness, subpoenaed because of the motion of a party, an agent, a defense attorney, or an assistant, has been examined by the presiding judge for his identity, the party, agent, or defense attorney shall examine these persons; if an accused, not represented by a defense attorney, does not want to examine these persons, the court shall still provide him with appropriate opportunities to question these persons.

The examination of a witness or an expert witness shall be in the following order:

1. The party, agent, or defense attorney calling the witness or expert witness shall do the direct examination first;
2. Followed by the opposing party's, his agent's or defense attorney's cross examination;
3. Then, the party, agent, or defense attorney calling the witness or expert witness shall do the redirect examination;
4. Finally, the opposing party, his agent or defense attorney shall make the recross examination.

After completing the examination as specified in the preceding section, the party, agent, or defense attorney may, with the court's approval, examine the witness or expert witness again.

After examined by the party, agent, or defense attorney, the witness or expert witness may be examined by the presiding judge.

If the one and the same accused or private prosecutor is represented by two or more agents or defense attorneys, the said agents or defense attorneys shall choose one of them to examine the one and the same witness or expert witness, unless otherwise permitted by the presiding judge.

If the witness or expert witness is called by both parties, the order of doing the direct examination shall be decided by both parties' agreement; if it can not be decided by such agreement, the presiding judge shall determine it.

== Other ==
=== Torture ===
While torture is illegal, there have been allegations of police brutality during the investigation process. They have led to controversy in light of several death sentences that have been carried out based on confessions claimed to be extracted under torture.

=== Capital punishment ===
While Taiwan maintains the death penalty for a variety of offenses, the number of executions dropped significantly since 2002, with only three executions in 2005 and none between 2006 and 2009. Executions resumed again in 2010.

== See also ==
- History of law in Taiwan
- Constitution of the Republic of China
- Six Codes
- Law schools in Taiwan
- Ministry of Justice (Taiwan)
- Judicial Yuan
- Supreme Court of the Republic of China
- Supreme Prosecutor Office
- Taiwan High Prosecutors Office
- District Courts (Republic of China)
- Referendums in Taiwan
- Law of Japan
- Law of Germany
- Firearms regulation in Taiwan
