= List of law schools in Taiwan =

In Taiwan, law can be studied in an undergraduate program resulting in a Bachelor of Law (LL.B.) or a postgraduate degree resulting in a Masters of Law (LL.M.). Some LL.M. programs in Taiwan are offered to students with or without a legal background. However, the graduation requirements for students with a legal background are lower than for those students who do not have a legal background (to account for fundamental legal subjects that were taken during undergraduate studies). Students studying in an LL.M. program normally take three years to earn the necessary credits and finish a master’s thesis. Ph.D. degrees are also offered in the area of law.

Students in law school receive academic rather than practical training. Practical training is arranged only after the individual passes the lawyer, judge or prosecutor exams.

== Law schools ==
- Aletheia University Department of Financial and Economic Law
- Asia University Department of Financial and Economic Law
- Chinese Culture University College of Law
- Chung Yuan Christian University School of Law
- Fu Jen Catholic University College of Law
- Hsuan Chuang University College of Law
- Kainan University Department of Law
- Ming Chuan University School of Law
- National Cheng Kung University College of Law
- National Chengchi University College of Law
- National Chung Cheng University College of Law
- National Chung Hsing University School of Law
- National Dong Hwa University Department of Law
- National Taipei University College of Law
- National Taiwan University College of Law
- National University of Kaohsiung College of Law
- National Yang Ming Chiao Tung University School of Law
- Providence University Department of Law
- Shih Hsin University College of Law
- Soochow University School of Law
- Tunghai University College of Law

== Compulsory courses for undergraduate students ==
According to the National Taiwan University College of Law:

First year

- Constitutional law
- Civil Code - General Principle I
- Criminal Code - General Principles I
- Civil Code - General Provisions of Obligations

Second year

- Civil Code - General Provisions of Obligations II
- Civil Code - Kinds of Provisions of Obligations
- Civil Code - Property
- Civil Code - Family and Succession law
- Criminal Code - General Principles II
- Criminal Code - Kinds of Offenses
- Administrative Law
- Legal History
- International Law

Third year

- Civil Procedure
- Criminal Procedure
- General Principles of Business Law & Corporation Law
- Insurance Law
- Law of Negotiable Instruments
- Maritime Law
- Jurisprudence

Fourth year

- Conflict of Laws

Fifth year

- Some law schools in Taiwan have a five-year LL.B. program to incorporate courses with specialties into their curriculum. Soochow University School of Law, for example, is well known for its five-year LL.B. program featuring Anglo-American law and comparative legal studies.

== See also ==
- Education in Taiwan
- History of education in Taiwan
- List of schools in Taiwan
- List of universities in Taiwan
- History of law in Taiwan
- Constitution of the Taiwan (ROC)
- Six Codes
- Law of the Taiwan (ROC)
- Ministry of Justice (Taiwan)
- Judicial Yuan
- Supreme Court of the Taiwan (ROC)
- Supreme Prosecutor Office
- Taiwan High Prosecutors Office
- District Courts of the Taiwan (ROC)
- Referendums in Taiwan
- Democracy Index
  - Modified Sainte-Laguë method with 234 seats or more
  - Open list PR
  - Unicameralism
  - Jury trial with 12
  - Judicial review
  - Bill of Rights
  - Separation of church and state
  - Separation of investment and retail banking
  - Corruption Perceptions Index
