= District court (Taiwan) =

Ordinary trial courts of Taiwan

District courts in Taiwan

Chinese name
- Chinese: 地方法院
Transcriptions
Standard Mandarin
- Hanyu Pinyin: Dìfāng Fǎyuàn
- Bopomofo: ㄉㄧˋ ㄈㄤ ㄈㄚˇ ㄩㄢˋ
- Wade–Giles: Ti^{4}-fang^{1} Fa^{3}-yüan^{4}
Hakka
- Romanization: Thi-fông Fap-yen
Southern Min
- Hokkien POJ: Tē-hng Hoat-īⁿ
- Tâi-lô: Tē-hng Huat-īnn

Japanese name
- Kanji: 地方法院
- Kana: ちほうほういん
Transcriptions
- Romanization: Chihō Hōin

The district courts (Chinese: 地方法院; pinyin: Dìfāng Fǎyuàn; Pe̍h-ōe-jī: Tē-hng Hoat-īⁿ) are the ordinary trial courts of general jurisdiction under the law of Taiwan. Currently there are 22 district courts under the jurisdiction of the Republic of China (Taiwan).

== History ==
District courts (地方法院, chihō-hōin) were first established in Taiwan in 1896. The jurisdiction of the district courts changed several times in the Japanese era. There were five (5) district courts in Taiwan as of 1945, the end of the Japanese rule, when the courts were incorporated into the Republic of China court system.

No.	Name	Japanese	Jurisdiction	Present division equivalent
1	Taihoku District Court	臺北地方法院	Northern Taihoku Prefecture	Taipei, New Taipei, Keelung
1	Giran Branch	宜蘭支部	Southern Taihoku Prefecture	Yilan
1	Karenkō Branch	花蓮港支部	Karenkō Prefecture, Taitō Prefecture	Hualien, Taitung
2	Shinchiku District Court	新竹地方法院	Shinchiku Prefecture	Taoyuan, Hsinchu city/county, Miaoli
3	Taichū District Court	臺中地方法院	Taichū Prefecture	Taichung, Changhua, Nantou
4	Tainan District Court	臺南地方法院	Southern Tainan Prefecture	Tainan
4	Kagi Branch	嘉義支部	Northern Tainan Prefecture	Chiayi city/county, Yunlin
5	Takao District Court	高雄地方法院	Takao Prefecture, Hōko Prefecture	Kaohsiung, Pingtung, Penghu

Note that the Empire of Japan was granted extraterritoriality in China from late 19th century until World War II. During this time, Taihoku District Court also handled the trial cases regarding Japanese citizens (including Taiwanese and Korean) in the Chinese provinces of Fujian, Guangdong and Yunnan.

After World War II, more district courts were established as the population growth. The newest district court, Ciaotou District Court, was established in September 2016 in Kaohsiung. This makes the total count of district courts in Taiwan to 22.

== List of District Courts ==
There are currently 20 district courts under the jurisdiction of the Taiwan High Court and 2 district courts under the jurisdiction of the Fuchien High Court. The Kinmen and Matsu district courts are under the jurisdiction of the Fuchien High Courts as those counties are part of Fujian Province and not part of Taiwan Province. The jurisdictions of district courts do not always follow the boundary of the administrative divisions.

No.	Name	Chinese	Jurisdiction	No.	Name	Chinese	Jurisdiction
1	Changhua	臺灣彰化地方法院	Changhua County	12	New Taipei	臺灣新北地方法院	Western New Taipei
2	Chiayi	臺灣嘉義地方法院	Chiayi, Chiayi County	13	Penghu	臺灣澎湖地方法院	Penghu County
3	Ciaotou	臺灣橋頭地方法院	Northern Kaohsiung	14	Shilin	臺灣士林地方法院	Northern Taipei and northern New Taipei
4	Hsinchu	臺灣新竹地方法院	Hsinchu, Hsinchu County	15	Pingtung	臺灣屏東地方法院	Pingtung County
5	Hualien	臺灣花蓮地方法院	Hualien County	16	Taichung	臺灣臺中地方法院	Taichung
6	Kaohsiung	臺灣高雄地方法院	Southern Kaohsiung	17	Tainan	臺灣臺南地方法院	Tainan
7	Keelung	臺灣基隆地方法院	Keelung and eastern New Taipei	18	Taipei	臺灣臺北地方法院	Southern Taipei and southern New Taipei
8	Kinmen	福建金門地方法院	Kinmen County	19	Taitung	臺灣臺東地方法院	Taitung County
9	Lienchiang	福建連江地方法院	Lienchiang County (Matsu Islands)	20	Taoyuan	臺灣桃園地方法院	Taoyuan City
10	Miaoli	臺灣苗栗地方法院	Miaoli County	21	Yilan	臺灣宜蘭地方法院	Yilan County
11	Nantou	臺灣南投地方法院	Nantou County	22	Yunlin	臺灣雲林地方法院	Yunlin County

== Divisions ==
Each District Court may establish summary division for different regions under it, for the adjudication of cases suitable for summary judgment and small claims cases. The civil summary procedure is for cases involving an amount in controversy of not more than 500,000 New Taiwan dollars and for simple legal disputes. The small claims cases are cases demanding payment for less than 100,000 NTD. Currently there are a total of 45 divisions in Taiwan. Additionally, there is a Taiwan Kaohsiung Juvenile Court, established in accordance with the Law Governing the Disposition of Juvenile Cases.

Each of the District Courts has civil, criminal and summary division and may establish specialized divisions to handle cases involving juveniles, family, traffic, and labor matters as well as motions to set aside rulings on violations of the Statute for the Maintenance of Social Order. Each division has a Division Chief Judge who supervises and assigns the business of the division. Each District Court has a Public Defenders' Office and a Probation Officers' Office.

== Judges ==
A single judge hears and decides cases in ordinary and summary proceedings as well as in small claims cases. A panel of three judges decides cases of great importance in ordinary proceedings as well as appeals or interlocutory appeals from the summary and small claims proceedings. Criminal cases are decided by a panel of three judges, with the exception of summary proceedings which may be held by a single judge. The Juvenile Court hears and decides only cases involving juveniles.

== Jurisdiction ==
District Courts have jurisdiction over the following cases:

- Ordinary or summary civil and criminal cases as well as civil small claim cases as courts of the first instance;
- Civil and criminal appeals or interlocutory appeals from decisions rendered by the summary divisions;
- Juvenile matters;
- Family matters;
- Traffic cases;
- Civil compulsory execution cases;
- Non-contentious matters;
- Civil protection writs;
- Rehabilitation of delinquents;
- Labor-management disputes;
- Elections and recalls;
- Violations of the Statute for the Maintenance of Social Order;
- Other cases prescribed by law.

== See also ==
- History of law in Taiwan
- Law of Taiwan
- Six Codes
- Constitution of the Republic of China
- Judicial Yuan
- Supreme Court of the Republic of China
- High Court (Taiwan)
- Ministry of Justice (Taiwan)
- Supreme Prosecutor Office
- Taiwan High Prosecutors Office
- List of law schools in Taiwan

== Gallery ==
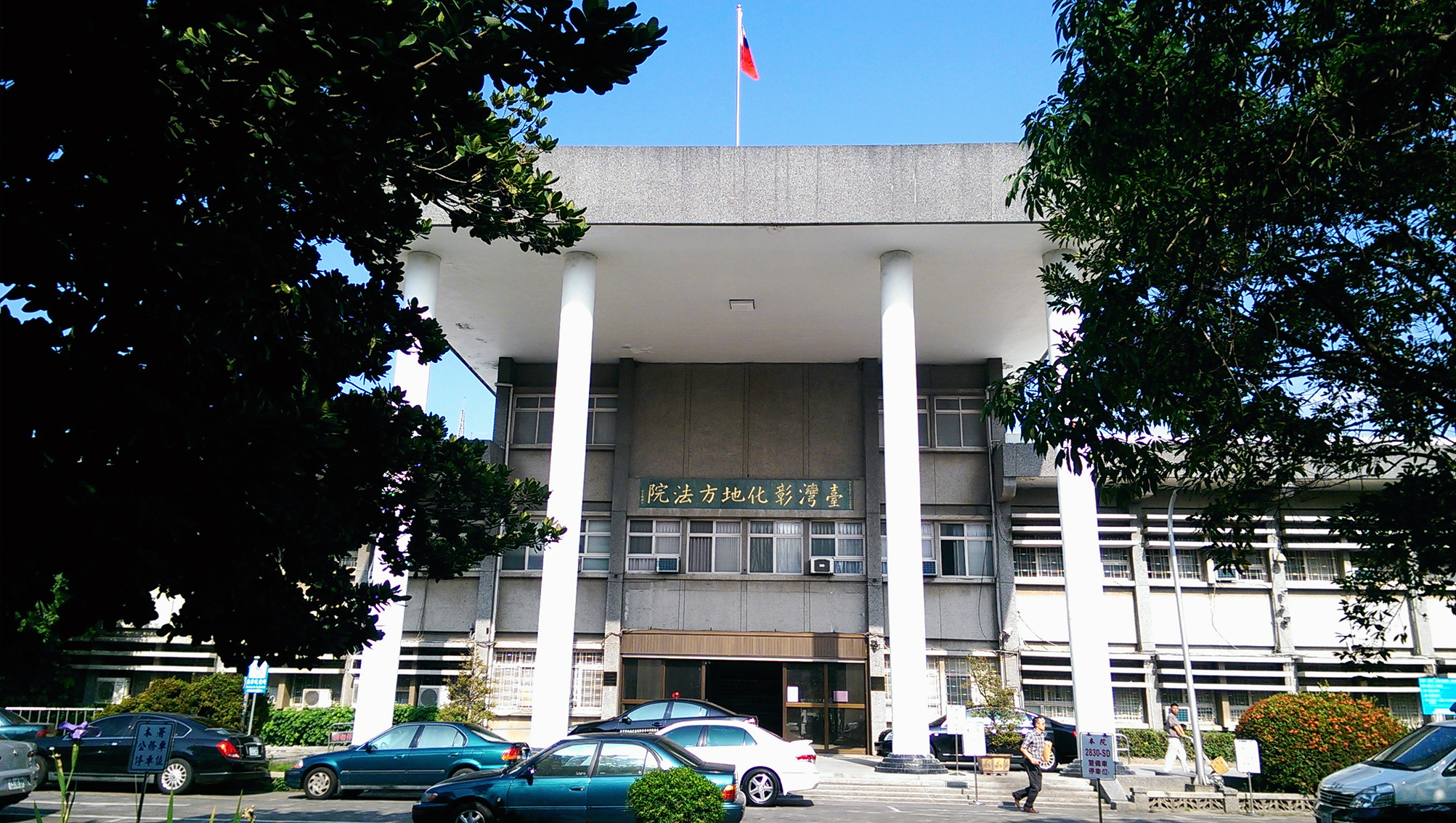
Taiwan Changhua District Court

Taiwan Chiayi District Court

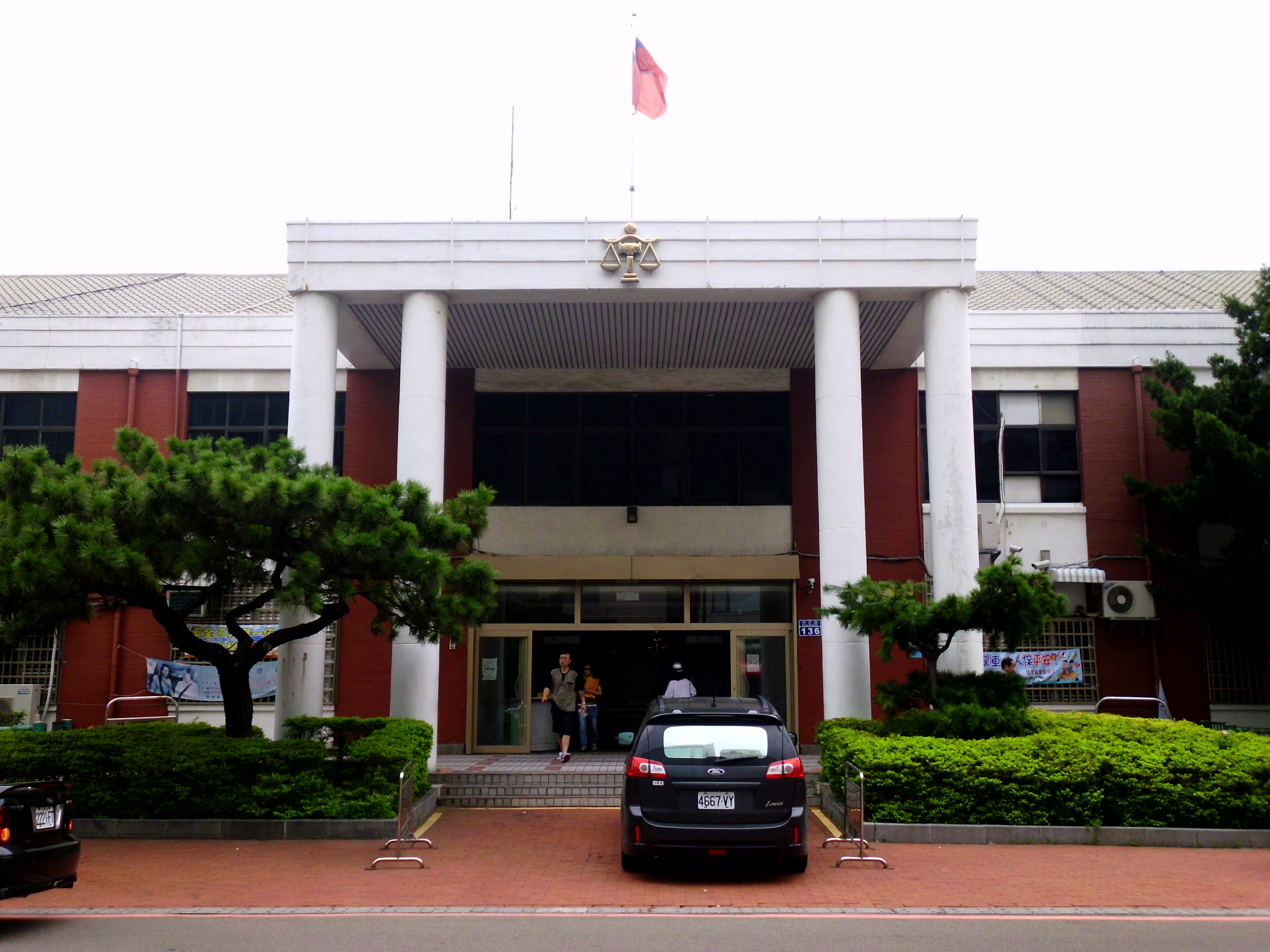
Taiwan Hsinchu District Court

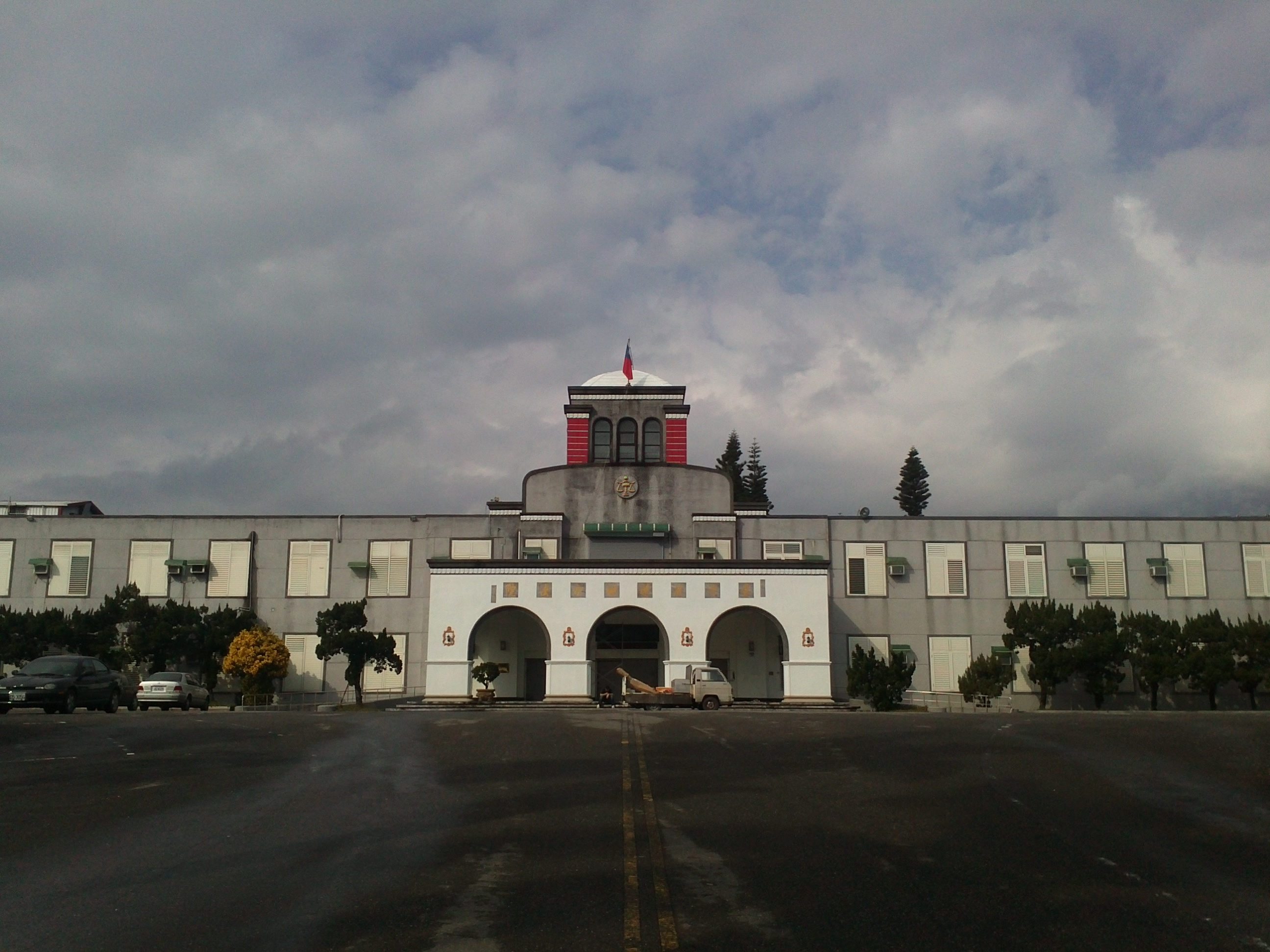
Taiwan Hualien District Court

Taiwan Kaohsiung District Court

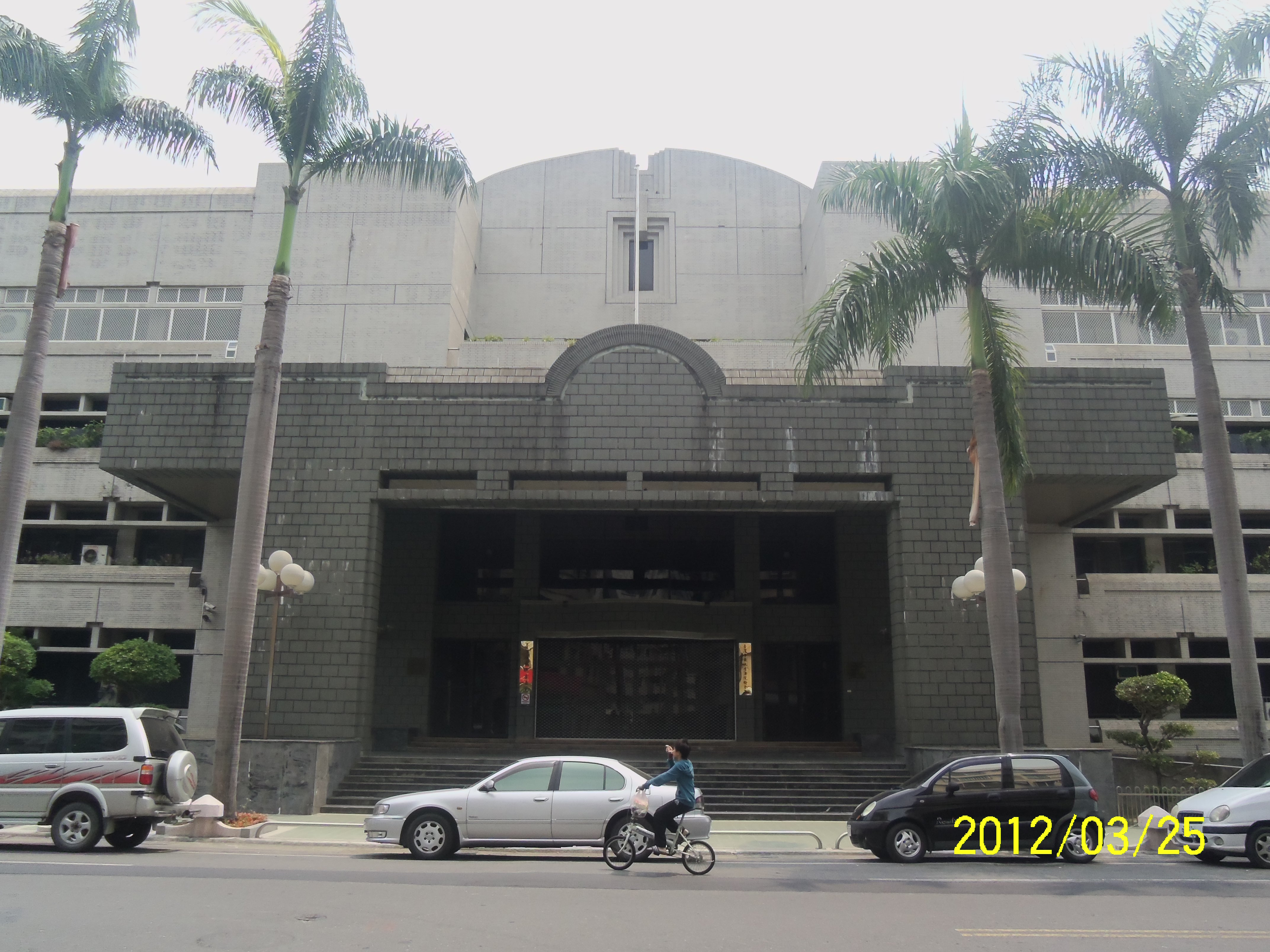
Taiwan Pingtung District Court

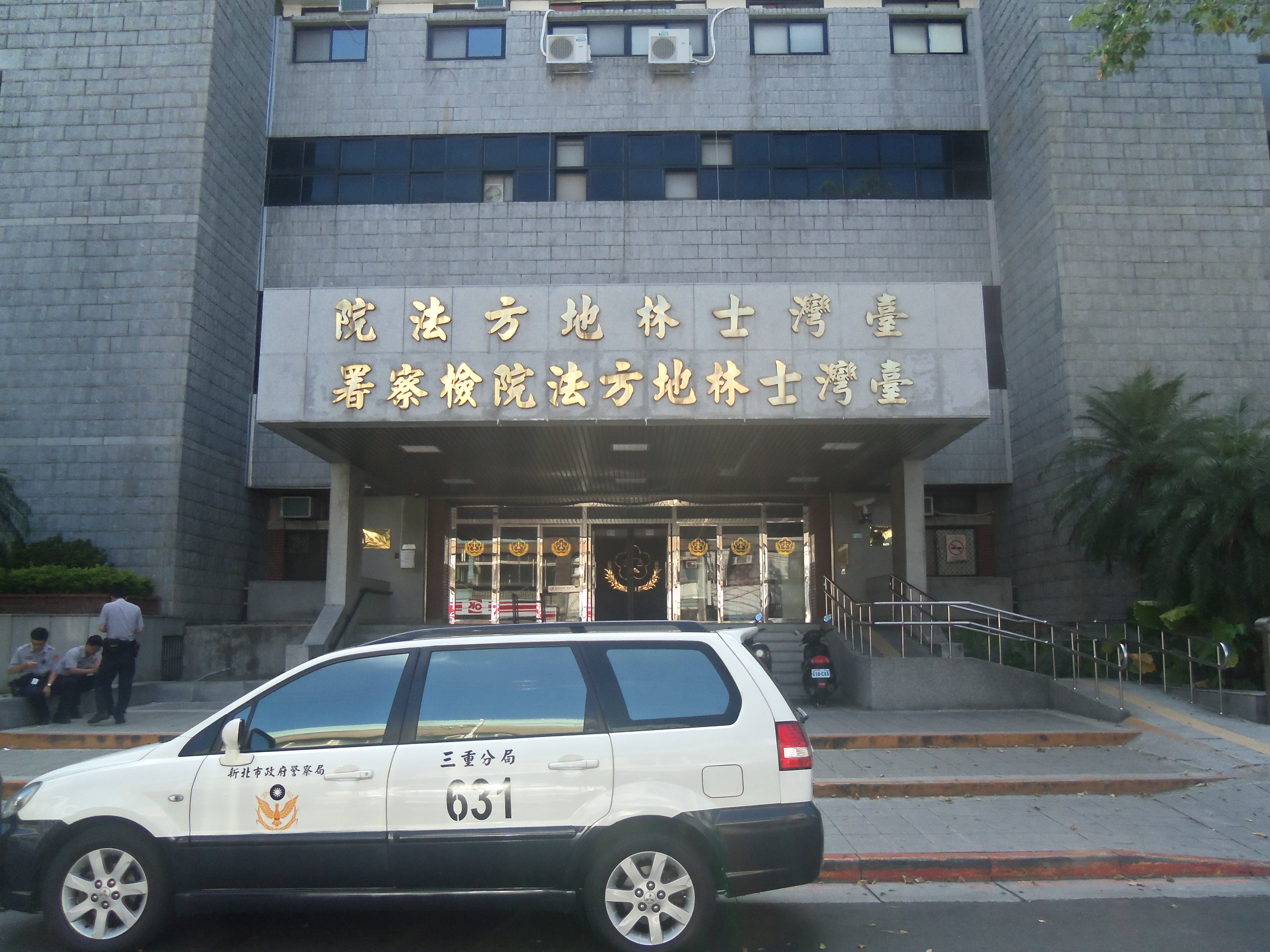
Taiwan Shilin District Court

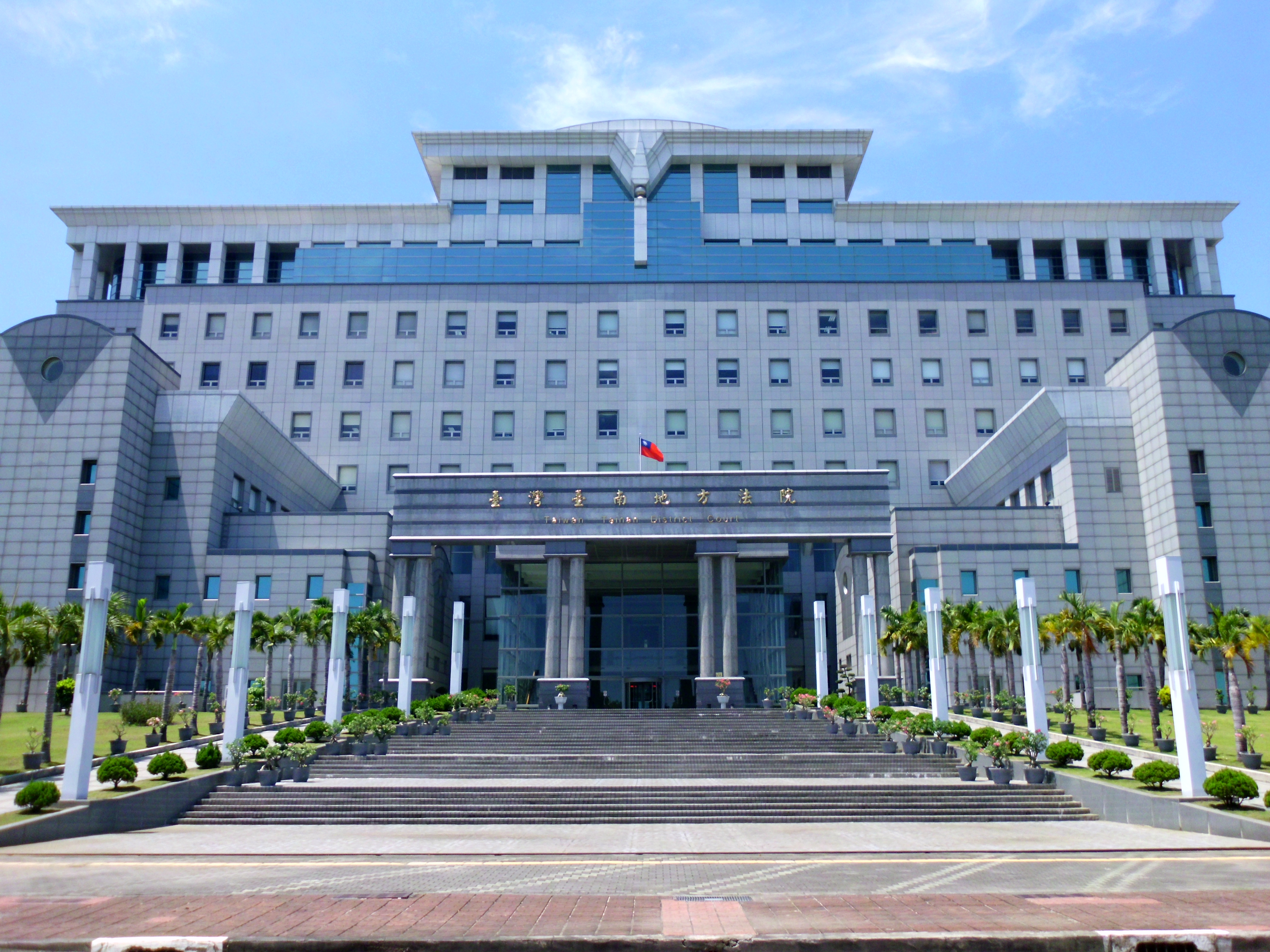
Taiwan Tainan District Court

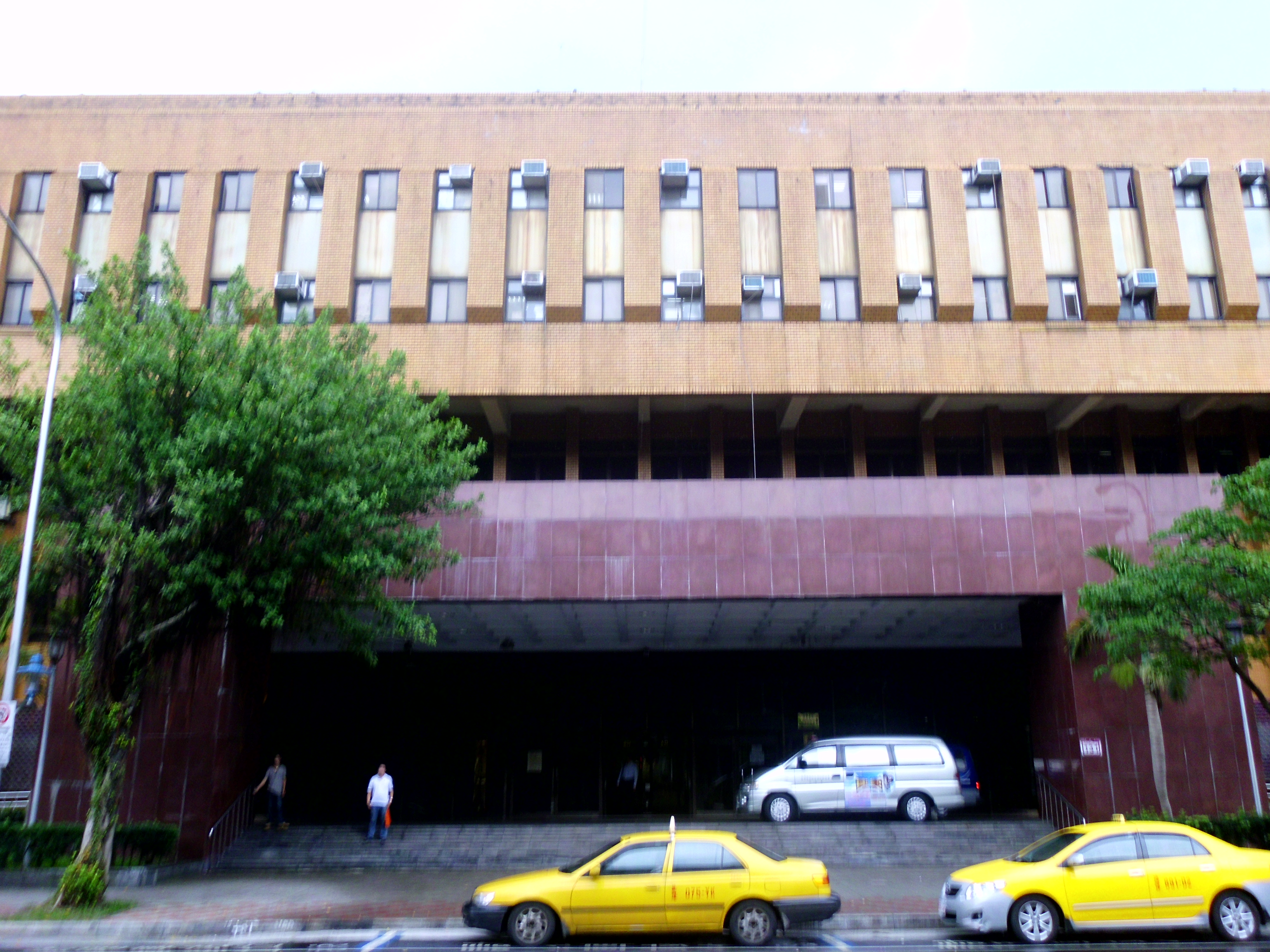
Taiwan Taipei District Court

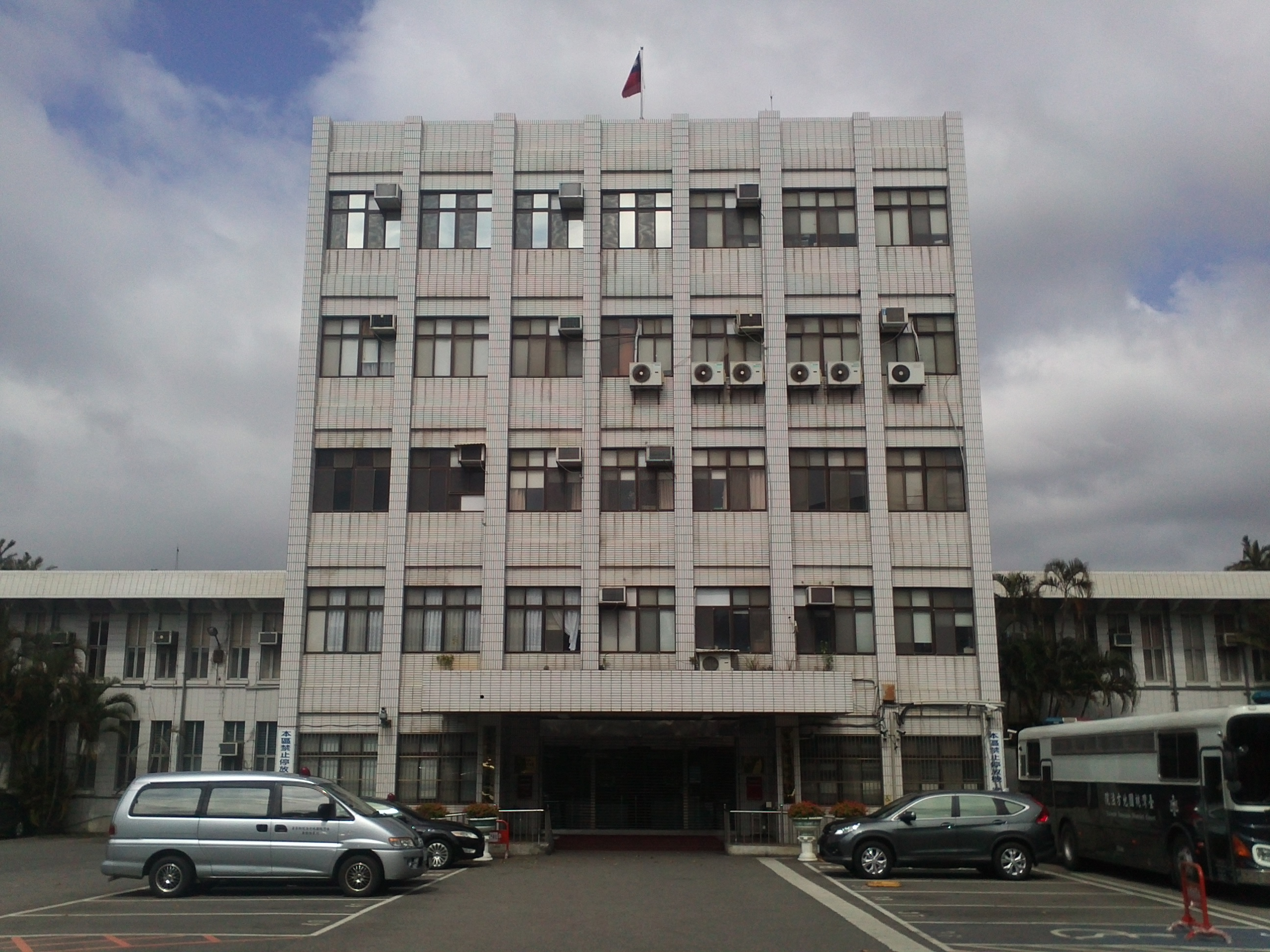
Taiwan Taoyuan District Court

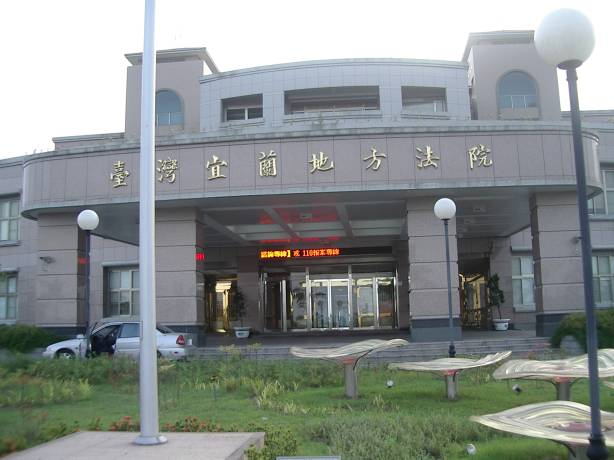
Taiwan Yilan District Court
