= Taiwan High Prosecutors Office =

- 臺灣高等檢察署
- Established: 1989 (current form)
- Location: Judicial Building, Taipei, Taiwan
- Authorised by: Court Organization Act
- Website: Taiwan High Prosecutors Office

The Taiwan High Prosecutors Office (THPO; Chinese: 臺灣高等檢察署; pinyin: Táiwān Gāoděng Fǎyuàn Jiǎnchá Shǔ) is located in Taipei, Taiwan. It has branch offices in Taipei, Taichung, Tainan, Kaohsiung and Hualien. It is one of the two high prosecutors offices in Taiwan.

The prosecutorial system runs parallel to its court system. As such, the jurisdiction of the THPO and its branch offices covers only Taiwan and its islands. Kinmen, Wuchiu and Matsu fall under the jurisdiction of the Kinmen Branch of the Fukien High Prosecutors Office. At whatever level, the prosecutors work under the unitary command of the prosecutor-general of the Supreme Prosecutors Office.

== General ==
According to the Law Governing Organization of Courts, prosecutors’ offices form part of the court at the same level of trial: the Supreme Court has a prosecutors' office with a number of prosecutors, of whom one is appointed as Prosecutor-General; each of the other High Courts or District Courts have its own prosecutors’ office with a number of prosecutors, of whom one is appointed as the chief prosecutor. The Law Governing Organization of Courts and the Statute Governing Judicial Personnel Administration also state that the qualifications of prosecutors are identical to that of judges. Both of them possess the status of judicial officials. Prosecutors are appointed from those persons who have passed the Examination of Judicial Officials, complete the Training Course for Judicial Officials and possess distinguished records after a term of practice.

== Territorial jurisdiction ==
The Taiwan High Prosecutors Office in Taipei

- District Prosecutors Offices in Taipei, Shilin, New Taipei, Taoyuan, Hsinchu, Keelung and Yilan

Taichung Branch of Taiwan High Prosecutors Office

- District Prosecutors Offices in Miaoli, Taichung, Changhua and Nantou

Tainan Branch of Taiwan High Prosecutors Office

- District Prosecutors Offices in Yunlin, Chiayi, Tainan

Kaohsiung Branch of Taiwan High Prosecutors Office

- District Prosecutors Offices in Kaohsiung, Pingtung, Penghu

Hualien Branch of Taiwan High Prosecutors Office

- District Prosecutors Offices in Hualien, Taitung

== Functions ==
- Review of non-prosecution decisions
- Trial attendance
- Review of criminal judgments
- Enforcement of criminal judgments of last resort
- Review of post-mortem forensic examination cases
- Platform for prosecutorial interaction
- Assistance in prisoner rehabilitation and victim protection affairs
- Public service

== See also ==
- History of law in Taiwan
- Law of Taiwan
- Six Codes
- Constitution of the Republic of China
- Judicial Yuan
- Supreme Court of the Republic of China
- High Court (Taiwan)
- District Courts (Taiwan)
- Ministry of Justice (Taiwan)
- Supreme Prosecutors Office
- List of law schools in Taiwan
