= Capital punishment in Taiwan =

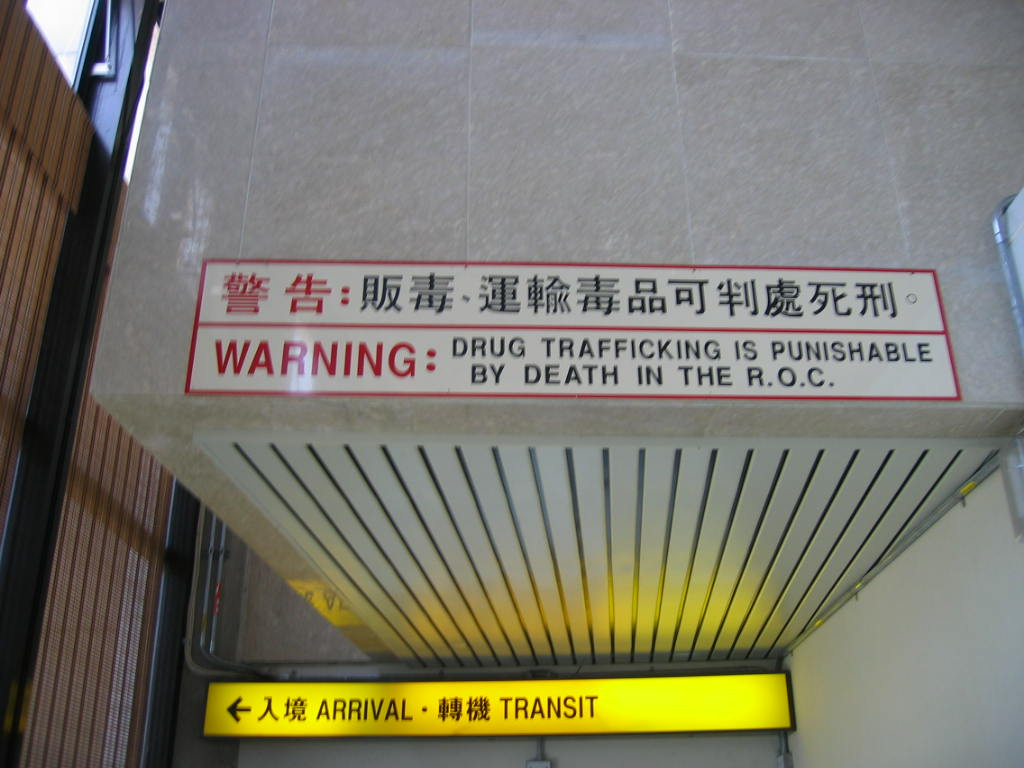
A sign at Taoyuan Airport warning that drug trafficking is punishable by death

Capital punishment is a legal penalty in the Republic of China (Taiwan). The list of capital offences for which the death penalty can be imposed includes murder, treason, drug trafficking, piracy, terrorism, and especially serious cases of robbery, rape, and kidnapping, as well as military offences such as desertion during wartime. In practice, however, all executions in Taiwan since the early 2000s have been for murder.

Before 2000, Taiwan had a relatively high execution rate, when strict laws surrounding capital punishment were still in effect. However, controversial legal cases during the 1990s and changing attitudes among officials towards the abolition of the death penalty led to a significant drop in the number of executions, with only three in 2005 and none between 2006 and 2009. Executions resumed in 2010, and according to polls, more than 80% of Taiwanese people support the continued use of capital punishment.

A 2024 poll found that 84% of Taiwanese oppose the abolition of the death penalty.

== Capital offences ==
=== Under military law ===
The Criminal Law of the Armed Forces rules that the following crimes are eligible for the death penalty when committed by military personnel:

- Treason (Article 14, 15)
- Collaboration (Article 17, 18)
- Espionage (Article 19, 20)
- Defection (Article 24)
- Malfeasance (Article 26, 27)
- Disclosure of intelligence or secrets (Article 31)
- Desertion only during war time (Article 41, 42)
- Disobeying orders (Article 47, 48)
- Mutiny (Article 49, 50)
- Hijacking (Article 53)
- Destroying military supplies and equipment (Article 58)
- Stealing and selling ammunition (Article 65)
- Fabricating orders (Article 66)

=== Under civilian law ===
The Criminal Code of the Republic of China rules that the following civilian offenses are eligible for the death penalty:

- Civil disturbance as ringleader (Article 101)
- Treason (Article 103, 104, 105, 107)
- Abandoning territory in charge (Article 120)
- Hijacking (Article 185–1, 185–2)
- Sexual Offenses with murder (Article 226–1)
- Civil servant forcing others to cultivate, sell or transport poppy plants to manufacture opium or morphine (Article 261)
- Murder (Article 271, 272, 272-1, 286)
- Robbery with homicide, severe injury, rape, kidnapping or arson (Article 328, 332)
- Piracy (Article 333, 334)
- Kidnapping with homicide, severe injury or rape (Article 347, 348)

Article 63 of the Criminal Code also rules that the death penalty cannot be imposed for offenders aged below 18 or above 80. The death penalty is not prescribed as a mandatory punishment in any case and is only imposed with the discretion of the sentencing court.

Other special laws which define capital offenses include:

- Civil Aviation Act
  - Hijacking
  - Endangering flight safety or aviation facilities by force and causing death
  - Using unapproved aviation products, appliances, and parts to cause death
- Narcotics Hazard Prevention Act
  - Manufacturing, transporting or selling Category One narcotics (Heroin, Morphine, Opium, Cocaine and their derivative products)
  - Compelling others to use Category One narcotics by means of violence, coercion, deception or other illegal methods
  - Civil servant manufacturing, transporting or selling Category Two narcotics (Opium poppy, Coca, Cannabis, Amphetamines, Pethidine, Pentazocine, and their derivative products)
- Punishment Act for Violation to Military Service System
  - Carrying weapons by group, obstructing a military service and causing death
  - Carrying weapons by group, fighting publicly against a military service and
    - Causing death or
    - Being the ringleader.
- Child and Youth Sexual Transaction Prevention Act
  - Committing and purposely killing the victim of
    - Making a person under 18 engage in a sexual transaction by violence, menace, medicament, control, hypnogenesis, or other ways against the will of himself/herself
    - Intending to making a person under 18 engage in a sexual transaction, and to deliver or accept him/her to or from another person by dealing, impawning or other ways and by violence, menace, medicament, control, hypnogenesis or other ways against the will of himself/herself
- Punishment Act for Genocide
  - Intending to commit genocide and committing any of the following:
    - Murder
    - Serious injury, physically or mentally
    - Fertility impairment
    - Child abduction
    - Other ways sufficient to eliminate the group
- Firearms, Ammunition, and Knives Control Act
  - Manufacturing, selling or transporting cannons, shoulder arms, machine guns, submachine guns, carbines, automatic rifles, rifles, traditional carbines, pistols, or any types of artillery shells, bombs and explosives without approval with an intention to commit a crime by himself/herself or assist others to commit a crime
- Act for the Control and Punishment of Smuggling
  - Smuggling, resisting arrest or inspection with a weapon and causing death

In practice, all death sentences and executions since 2003 have been imposed for murder-related offences. The last non-homicide-related execution in Taiwan took place in October 2002, in the case of a Pingtung County fisherman who was accused of trafficking 295 kg of heroin in 1993.

=== Repealed legislation ===
Two laws, now invalid, have historically contributed to a significant number of executions in Taiwan:

- The Punishment of Rebellion Act, repealed in May 1991), which imposed a mandatory death sentence for cases of treason, espionage, and defection. The law was enacted in 1949 when the Central Government had just retreated to Taiwan, and was applicable to both military and common courts, playing an important role during the White Terror. Information about people sentenced according to this law was historically restricted because of their legal status as courts-martial. Two high-profile cases, that of Bo Yang and Shih Ming-teh, involved an initial death sentence under this law that was eventually commuted to life imprisonment due to heavy political pressure that surrounded their trials.
- Robbery Punishment Act (zh:懲治盜匪條例, repealed in January 2002), which ruled a mandatory death penalty for cases of kidnapping, piracy or robbery along with murder, rape, and arson. Originally enacted as a short-term special law by the Kuomintang government during the Second Sino-Japanese War period, this law was eventually extended indefinitely for security reasons.

== Execution process ==
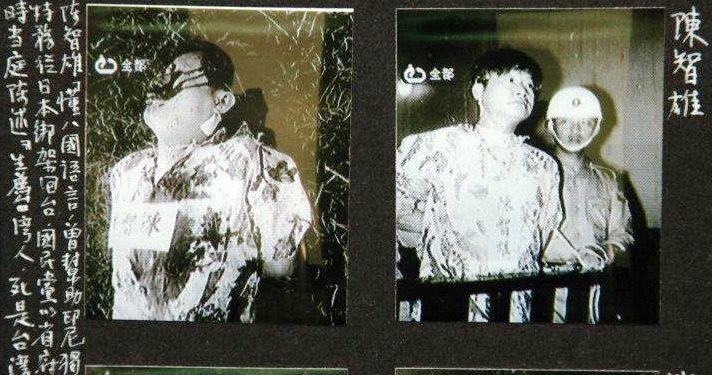
Taiwanese political dissident Chen Chih-hsiung’s execution

A ROC judicial execution requires a final sentence from the Supreme Court of the Republic of China and a warrant of execution signed by the Minister of Justice. After the Supreme Court either rejects an appeal of, or issues a final death sentence, the case is transferred to the Ministry of Justice, where the Minister of Justice issues a final secret execution date. There are no statutes or regulations regarding time limits before the Minister must sign a warrant of execution, though once a warrant of execution is issued, the inmate must be executed within three days. Should any new evidence or procedural flaw that influences the verdict to be discovered during the three-day period, the condemned inmate may make a plea to the Ministry of Justice. This may then delay the warrant of execution if either the Prosecutor General of the Supreme Prosecutors Office makes an Extraordinary Appeal to the Supreme Court, or if the responsible High Court accepts the discovery of new evidence and initiates a retrial. However, such cases are very rare: to date, only one condemned prisoner avoided capital punishment after the warrant of execution was issued. The President of Republic of China can also award clemency, but so far only President Chiang Kai-shek ever exercised this legal right, once in 1957. President Lee Teng-hui also ordered two nationwide commutations in 1988 and 1991 in which two sentences were commuted from death to life imprisonment.

The warrant of execution from the Minister of Justice is received and performed by the High Prosecutors offices, so executions are carried out inside the detention centers of the six municipalities with a High Court: Taipei, Taichung, Tainan, Kaohsiung, Hualien, and Kinmen. Like Japan, ROC death row inmates are kept in detention centres but not prisons, and under harsher conditions than general prisoners. Typically two inmates are housed in a cell (or solitary imprisonment in cases of misbehavior or violence). The practice of shackling prisoners 24 hours a day has been reported to be no longer in effect, but prisoners on death row are only allowed to leave the cell for half an hour a day for exercise. Prisoners are allowed to read censored newspapers and books as well as practise religious activities with approved religious personnel.

Executions are carried out by shooting using a handgun aimed at the heart from the back, or aimed at the brain stem under the ear if the prisoner had consented to organ donation prior to the withdrawal of legal death row organ donation. The execution time used to be 5:00 a.m., but was changed to 9:00 p.m. in 1995 to reduce officials' workload. It was changed again to 7:30 p.m. in 2010. Executions are performed in secret: nobody is informed beforehand, including the condemned. The condemned is brought to the execution range and the officers may pay respect to the statue of Ksitigarbha located outside the range before entering. Before the execution, the prisoner's identity is confirmed by a special court next to the execution range under the supervision of the prosecutor and chooses to record any last words. The prisoner is then brought to the execution range and served a last meal (which usually includes a bottle of kaoliang wine). The condemned prisoner is then injected with strong anaesthetic to cause unconsciousness, laid flat on the ground, face down, and shot. The executioner then burns a votive bank note for the deceased before carrying away the corpse. It is tradition for the condemned to place a NT$500 or 1000 banknote in his leg irons as a tip for the executioners.

After the execution, the High Prosecutor's Office issues the official announcement of the execution. Although the Ministry of Justice has studied other methods including hanging and lethal injection since the early 1990s, execution by shooting (performed by local bailiffs or military policemen) is the only execution method used in the ROC currently (including military executions).

Military sentences and executions in Taiwan used to be administered only by the Ministry of National Defense, with the warrant of execution signed by the Minister of National Defense, and have no connection with the Ministry of Justice. They were carried out in military courts and prisons across the island as well as Penghu, Kinmen and Matsu. Unlike the Ministry of Justice, the Ministry of National Defense did not release detailed information on executions, and so little information was available. Since 2013, all ordinary crimes conducted by military personnel are transferred to the jurisdiction of common courts due to the Death of Hung Chung-chiu, rendering all military courts, military prosecutors office, and military prisons obsolete in peacetime. Therefore, technically all military executions are also under the jurisdiction of the Ministry of Justice, though there have been no military death row inmates since 2002.

=== Japanese colonial era ===
The death penalty in Taiwan under Japanese rule period was carried out by hanging.

== Execution statistics ==
The ROC's Ministry of Justice publishes detailed statistics annually on each year's executions, including the executed person's name, age, sex, crime, nationality, education, etc. The numbers of executions since 1987 are listed below:

The Number of Executed People in Taiwan since 1987
						1987	1988	1989	1990	1991	1992	1993	1994	1995	1996	1997	1998	1999	2000
						10	22	69	78	59	35	18	17	16	22	38	32	24	17
2001	2002	2003	2004	2005	2006	2007	2008	2009	2010	2011	2012	2013	2014	2015	2016	2017	2018	2019	2020
10	9	7	3	3	0	0	0	0	4	5	6	6	5	6	1	0	1	0	1
2021	2022	2023	2024	2025															
0	0	0	0	1															

The execution tally was at its height in the late 1980s and early 1990s when martial law had just been lifted and social order was destabilized. The strict Act for the Control and Punishment of Banditry resulted in the execution of many prisoners.

Among the executed were a small number of foreign nationals from mainland China, the Philippines, Thailand, Malaysia and Singapore. They were executed in Taiwan for kidnapping, murder or drug trafficking offenses.

== Controversies ==
=== Organ transplantation ===
There are accounts of organs being removed from executed prisoners while they were not yet clinically dead.

The Death Penalty Procedural Rules of Taiwan used to state that inmates who have agreed to donate their organs are shot in the head. Twenty minutes after the execution, an examination is conducted to verify the death of the condemned person. The bodies of donors are sent to hospitals for organ collection after completion of the execution is confirmed. In 2012, the Ministry of Justice announced that they would no longer approve any requests from death row inmates to donate organs; Then in 2020, all relevant statutes were invalidated.

According to the Human Organ Transplantation Act of Taiwan, an organ donor can only donate after being judged brain-dead by a medical doctor. When a ventilator is in use, there must be an observation period of 12 hours for the first evaluation and a four-hour period for the second evaluation to reach a judgment of brain death.

In Taiwan, there have been cases of bodies being sent to hospitals for organ collection without legal confirmation of brain death, leading to accusations that human vivisection for organ collection and transplantation is in practice in Taiwan. In one case in 1991 a prospective donor was found to be still breathing unaided when being prepared for organ collection in the Taipei Veterans General Hospital. The person was sent back to the execution ground to complete the execution. This case caused the Taipei Veterans General Hospital to refuse organ collection of executed inmates for eight years.

=== The Hsichih Trio case ===
In March 1991, a Hsichih couple, Wu Ming-han and Yeh Ying-lan, were found robbed and murdered inside their apartment. In August 1991 police arrested their neighbor Wang Wen-hsiao, then serving in the ROC Marine Corps, based on Wang's bloody fingerprint found at the scene. He confessed to the murder after investigators discovered evidence of him breaking in and entering the house, but police doubted he could have killed two adults so easily and brutally without help. Under torture, Wang confessed to help from three accomplices who lived in the same community—Su Chien-ho, Chuang Lin-hsun and Liu Bin-lang. These four young men further confessed that they gang raped Yeh Ying-lan during their break-in, but the autopsy of Yeh's body showed no traces of sexual assault.

Wang Wen-hsiao was court-martialed and speedily executed in January 1992. The other three defendants were prosecuted under the Act for the Control and Punishment of Banditry, which stipulated compulsory death sentences for their crimes if found guilty. During their trial, the defendants repeatedly claimed they were forced to make false confessions under torture and were not guilty, but the judges did not believe them.

In February 1995, the Supreme Court of the Republic of China found against the defendants. According to the procedure, the three should then have been executed by shooting as soon as possible, but Minister of Justice Ma Ying-jeou refused to sign their death warrants and returned the whole case back to the Supreme Court in hope of a retrial, citing shortcomings such as:

- Only two pieces of evidence were brought against the defendants: Wang Wen-hsiao's confessions and the NT$ 24 dollars (less than $1.00 US) found in Chuang Lin-hsun's home and considered to be booty. The evidence was too weak: Wang Wen-hsiao was executed too early to witness the case and NT$24 was a tiny amount.
- Although all four defendants claimed they were tortured during police interrogation, at which there was no lawyer present, the judges did not investigate this point thoroughly. Wang Wen-hsiao's brother Wang Wen-chung even claimed Hsichih police originally asked his brother to confess as an accomplice, but he had refused.
- There was no evidence that Yeh Ying-lan was raped.

Between 1995 and 2000, Ma Ying-jeou and his three successors filed several retrial requests with the Supreme Court, but all were rejected. Meantime, this case drew the attention of Amnesty International and was widely broadcast throughout the world, nicknamed as "the Hsichih Trio".

The Supreme Court ordered a retrial on May 19, 2000, just one day before former President Chen Shui-bian's inauguration. On January 13, 2003, the Taiwan High Court passed a verdict that they were not guilty and released them, but the victims' families were unwilling to accept this and appealed. On June 29, 2007, the Taiwan High Court once again found the trio guilty and condemned them to death, but surprisingly did not put them in custody because "the 3 defendants are already famous worldwide and will be identified in any place", the first such case in the ROC history. On November 12, 2010, the Taiwan High Court delivered another verdict, revoking the previous decision and finding the three not guilty, "as there was no proof for the crime they were accused of." The prosecutor appealed again, and the Supreme Court ordered yet another retrial on Apr. 21, 2011. On August 31, 2012, the High Court reaffirmed the innocence of the three defendants. According to criminal procedure legislation that came into effect in 2010, when court proceedings have begun on a criminal case more than six years previously, and the Supreme Court had ordered more than three retrials, if the High Court has already found the defendants to be not guilty twice and decided not guilty again in the third trial, the prosecutor may no longer appeal. The High Court delivered the first not guilty verdict in 2003, and again in 2010. With the 2012 verdict, the Hsichih trio meets the condition of the new criminal legislation, and the case is concluded.

=== Lu Cheng's case ===
In December 1997, Tainan native Lu Cheng, an unemployed former policeman, was charged with the kidnapping and murder of a local woman, Chan Chun-tzu, who along with her husband were both former high school classmates of Lu's. The Supreme Court of the Republic of China sentenced Lu to death in June 2000 but his family noted several suspicious points:

- As with the Hsichih Trio, Lu Cheng had been tortured by police and was forced into making a confession.
- The judges intentionally ignored his alibi that he had been with his young niece at the time of the murder.
- The kidnapper phoned the victim's husband during the crime. If Lu Cheng had committed the kidnapping, the victim's husband should have been able to identify his voice.
- The verdict stated that Lu Cheng had used his shoelaces to strangle the victim. However, the autopsy showed the victim's strangulation burns did not match Lu's shoelaces.

Despite these suspicious points, the Minister of Justice Chen Ding-nan ordered Lu Cheng's execution on September 7, 2000, just one day before that year's Mid-Autumn Festival. There were rumours that Lu Cheng remained conscious after receiving five anaesthetic injections at 3:00 a.m., so the officials had to shoot him while he was conscious and his eyes remained open after his death. Lu Cheng's family continues to protest but there has been no concrete official response to date.

=== Chiang Kuo-ching's case ===
President Ma Ying-jeou and the Ministry of National Defense have made a public apology to the family of former Air Force Pvt. Chiang Kuo-ching for his wrongful execution in 1997. Chiang was arrested for the September 12, 1996, rape and murder of a five-year-old girl known only by the surname of Hsieh. He was tortured into making a false confession by military counterintelligence.

After reopening the case, investigators arrested Hsu Jung-chou, on 28 January 2011. Hsu then confessed to the crime, thereby posthumously exonerating Chiang. Chiang's family later received NT$103 million (equivalent to US$3.45 million) in compensation for the wrongful execution. In December 2011, Hsu was convicted of the murder of Hsieh and sentenced to 18 years in prison. However, Hsu appealed his conviction. In early April 2013, the Taiwan High Court determined that Hsu was not guilty of the crime after all, and he was released from prison immediately. The court found that Hsu was mentally challenged and could not write, operating on the emotional and intellectual level of a child between the ages of 9 and 12 years old, and that he had made seven confessions that were all contradicted by physical evidence and official autopsy findings. Moreover, his confessions had been written by a member of the military who refused to testify in person during Hsu's rehearing. The Taipei District Prosecutors' Office announced that once they read the ruling, they would determine if it was appropriate to appeal the acquittal to the Supreme Court, but as of August 2020, there have been no further legal developments in the case. The identity of the real murderer remains unknown.

The officials who handled the original investigation that led to Chiang's execution were protected from prosecution by the statute of limitations for public employees. However, many of the officers and civilians who had received awards for presumably solving the case had those awards revoked.

=== Chiou Ho-shun's case ===
In late 1987, two crimes were committed by a 12-man group led by Chiou Ho-shun. One was the murder of saleswoman Ko Hung Yu-lan, and the other was the kidnapping of schoolboy Lu Cheng. Both of these crimes were related to money and extortion. In September 1988, Chiou Ho-shun and the 11 accomplices were arrested, and Chiou was sentenced to death in 1989.

The case has achieved controversy due to the torture committed by police in order to obtain the confessions. Chiou was reported to be blindfolded, tied up, forced to sit on ice, shocked by electric batons, and made to swallow pepper water during his interrogations, some of which lasted up to 10 hours. In addition, no physical evidence of their crimes have been produced, and all evidence is solely provided by their confessions, many of which had inconsistent details, such as:

- The murder weapons used in the murder of Ko Hung Yu-lan were a rope and three sharp knives. However, a plastic bag found near the body contained a butcher's knife, a rectangular knife, and a veterinary syringe. The bag was later confiscated by the police and disappeared.
- Chiou confessed to taking Ko Hung to a hotel on the day of her death, but there is no record of them staying in a hotel.
- Chiou and others confessed kidnapping Lu Cheng as he was seen coming to school in a luxury car, but Lu's parents testified that he came to school by bus.
- The defendants mentioned eight sites where Lu's corpse was dumped. However, none have contained Lu's body.

After 11 retrials, in 2011 the Supreme Court upheld Chiou's death sentence.

== Religious attitudes ==
=== Buddhist ===
Taiwan's major Buddhist authorities hold diverse interpretations of what can be considered a "Buddhist perspective" to capital punishment:

- Fo Guang Shan Buddhist Order holds that the abolishment of capital punishment "is not necessary", and that it corresponds to the laws of cause and effect in Buddhism.
- Master Sheng Yen, founder of the Dharma Drum Mountain, said: "Now, should capital punishment be abolished? As a Dharma master, of course I hope it will be abolished". He taught that there are no unchangingly bad people, and all sentient beings can become Buddhas. He argued that abolishing capital punishment should take two paths: legally decrease the number of death sentences, and promote religious education so as to prevent crime.
- Tzu Chi Buddhist Master and Hsuan Chuang University College of Social Sciences Dean Shih Chao-hui has written:

...the Buddha has stated very clearly that 'no killing' is the first rule of the five basic moral ethics (the Five Precepts). It is absolutely impossible for Buddha to speak favorably of 'solving problems through killing'. Killings will only lead to more killings. It is not necessary for the victims and their family members to take revenge personally, and no third parties are needed to join into the network of killing. Their own karma will not let them run away.

== Political attitudes ==
The Kuomintang, New Party and People First Party strongly support the use of capital punishment.

The Democratic Progressive Party has both proponents and opponents of capital punishment, but its platform states that the party is discussing possibility of abolition of capital punishment.

Generally, the New Power Party and the Green Party Taiwan are for the abolition of capital punishment.

During a 2002 state visit by Taiwanese Minister of Justice Chen Ding-nan to the United States, US Attorney General John Ashcroft announced that Chen had made a policy statement of moving towards abolishing the death penalty using a phased approach.

Currently, there are a number of NGOs in Taiwan promoting the abolition of the death penalty. The organizations that actively advocate for abolition are Taiwan Association for Human Rights, Judicial Reform Foundation, Taiwan Covenants Watch, Amnesty International Taiwan, Taipei Bar Association, and Taiwan Alliance to End the Death Penalty.

== Temporary moratorium from 2006 to 2009 ==
These controversial cases apparently influenced the local judicial system.

After being elected in 2000, President Chen Shui-bian, announced that he supported the abolition of capital punishment in Taiwan. In 2001, Justice Minister Chen Ding-nan called for the abolition of capital punishment within Chen's first term, but said that "only when the public accepts abolition" would the government bring forward the necessary legislation. Although the death penalty was not abolished during that period, the Justice Ministry released a position statement in 2004 ("The Policy of the Ministry of Justice of Taiwan with Regard to Abolition of the Death Penalty") which envisioned a national dialogue toward the formation of "a popular consensus for abolition" followed by abolition. Under Chen, there was a major decline in capital punishment in Taiwan.

Although the right to abolish the death penalty is held by the Legislative Yuan which was dominated by the opposing Pan-blue coalition, as well as being more conservative on this issue, the Democratic Progressive Party government forced a moratorium by not signing death warrants except for serious and noncontroversial cases. As a result, the number of executions dropped significantly from 2002. In an October 2006 interview, Chen Ding-nan's successor Morley Shih said he would not sign any death warrants for the 19 defendants who had already been sentenced to death by the Supreme Court, because their cases were still being reviewed inside the Ministry. These conditions remained in effect until Chen Shui-bian's tenure expired on May 20, 2008.

In May 2008, Chen Shui-bian's successor Ma Ying-jeou nominated Wang Ching-feng as the Minister of Justice. Wang opposed capital punishment and delayed every case delivered to the Minister's Office. Until March 2010, a total of 44 prisoners given death sentences by the Supreme Court were detained by the Ministry but Wang still publicly announced her strong opposition to capital punishment during media interviews. This caused controversy and the consensus suddenly broke after entertainer Pai Bing-bing (whose daughter Pai Hsiao-yen was kidnapped and murdered in 1997) held a high-profile protest against Wang. Wang, who originally refused to step down, bowed to social pressure and resigned on March 11, 2010. Wang's successor Tseng Yung-fu promised premier Wu Den-yih that he would resume executions. On April 30, 2010, Tseng Yung-fu ordered four executions, ending the four-year moratorium.

== 2024 Constitutional Court hearing ==
In April 2024, a group of 37 people on Taiwan's death row, represented by lawyers Jeffrey and Nigel Li, petitioned the Constitutional Court to rule on the death penalty.

The court ultimately ruled on 20 September 2024 that the death penalty was constitutional and should remain for the most serious crimes and under certain circumstances that called for it. Three of the fifteen constitutional court justices recused from the case. The ruling considered the International Covenant on Civil and Political Rights, became effective immediately upon its pronouncement, and prohibited capital punishment for defendants with mental conditions, abolishing the requirement for defendants to prove that their mental conditions affected their judgment at the time of the crimes.

Since the Constitutional Court ruling, the death penalty was upheld in a case heard by the Taiwan High Court Kaohsiung Branch on 15 January 2025, and one of the accused who plead to the Constitutional Court, Huang Lin-kai, was executed the next day.

== 2025 referendum proposal ==
In May 2025, the Legislative Yuan, dominated by the Kuomintang (KMT) and the Taiwan People's Party (TPP), passed a second reading of a proposed referendum opposing the abolition of the death penalty. The referendum question asks voters whether they support removing the requirement for unanimous decisions by judicial panels when sentencing defendants to death. Proponents argue that the current legal requirement established by the Constitutional Court in 2023 effectively renders capital punishment unworkable and contradicts public sentiment, which overwhelmingly supports retaining the death penalty.

The move reignited debate between Taiwan's major political parties. While the Democratic Progressive Party (DPP) has long advocated for abolition and has not carried out executions regularly aside from a rare case in January 2024, it criticized the referendum as politically motivated and legally unnecessary. The DPP maintains that capital punishment yet to be formally abolished and accused the opposition of using the issue to galvanize support ahead of upcoming elections. The Central Election Commission rejected the capital punishment referendum proposal on 23 May 2025.

== See also ==
- Crime in Taiwan
- Law of Taiwan
