= Journalist (disambiguation) =

A journalist is a person who practises journalism, the gathering and dissemination of information about current events, trends, issues and people.

Journalist may also refer to:

- Journalist (British magazine), monthly magazine published by the UK's National Union of Journalists
- Journalist (Russian magazine), Russian magazine founded in 1914
- Journalist (rapper)
- Journalist (film), a 1979 Yugoslav film
- The Journalist, the narrator of Jeff Wayne's Musical Version of The War of the Worlds

== See also ==
- The Journalist (disambiguation)
- JournoList
- Journal (disambiguation)
