= Huang Lin-kai =

Taiwanese murderer (1993–2025)

- 黃麟凱
- Born: 1993; Taiwan
- Died: 16 January 2025 (aged 31–32); Taipei Detention Center, Agency of Corrections, Ministry of Justice, Taipei, Taiwan
- Cause of death: Execution by shooting
- Occupation: Conscript (Note: At the time of the murders.)
- Status: Executed
- Criminal charges: Murder x2; Rape
- Penalty: Death (Wang's murder); Life imprisonment without the possibility of parole (Wang's mother's murder)

Details
- Victims: Wang Ping-zhi (former girlfriend) and her mother

Huang Lin-kai (Chinese: 黃麟凱; 1993 – 16 January 2025) was a Taiwanese rapist and convicted double murderer who was executed by Taiwan for the murder of his former girlfriend in Sanchong District, New Taipei City, on 1 October 2013.

== Background and murders ==
Huang was an active-duty soldier within the Taiwanese Army, serving his conscription time when the crimes took place. In the late 2000s, Huang had met Wang Ping-zhi at the New Taipei Municipal San-Chung Commercial and Industrial Vocational High School, where they became engaged and developed an intimate relationship. The couple broke up in July 2013 but maintained frequent contact until September 2013, when Wang discovered that Huang had stolen money from her bank account. Bitter over the termination of their relationship, Huang planned the murder of his ex-girlfriend.

At around 4:00 p.m. on 1 October 2013, Huang broke into Wang's home and found her mother inside. He proceeded to kill the woman by strangling her to death, waiting for more than an hour for Wang to return home. When the young woman entered the house, Huang ambushed her and tied and duck-taped her mouth. He subsequently raped and murdered her by strangulation.

After the bodies were found by Wang's father and his eldest daughter's boyfriend, police arrived at the scene and found Huang hiding on the roof. He was arrested and taken to a police station.

== Trial and execution ==
Huang was charged with the rape and murder of his former girlfriend Wang Ping-zhi as well as with the murder of her mother. In 2017, the New Taipei District Court found him guilty of all counts and sentenced him to death for Wang's murder, while the court sentenced Huang to life in prison without the possibility of parole for the murder of Wang's mother.

After the first verdict, Huang appealed to the Supreme Court, asking for a review of his case and whether it constituted among the "most heinous" crimes, a requirement for the imposition of the death penalty in Taiwan. That same year, the Supreme Court upheld his death sentence as well as the life sentence over the two killings. The Constitutional Court finalized the death sentence in 2024, paving the path forward for Huang's execution. Wang's father asked for the sentence to be carried out as soon as possible.

In the early hours of 16 January 2025, the Ministry of Justice announced that Minister Cheng Ming-chien had signed Huang's death warrant and that he would be put to death that same night. Huang was executed by shooting at 10:02 p.m. local time on 16 January 2025 at the Taipei Detention Centre, becoming the first case of a death sentence being carried out under the presidency of Lai Ching-te and the first in the country since 2020.

Huang's execution was met with condemnation from local and international human rights organizations like Amnesty International, Human Rights Watch, and governments of the European Union, while Wang's father welcomed the decision to put Huang to death.

== See also ==
- Death penalty in Taiwan
- List of most recent executions by jurisdiction
