= Chang Jen-bao =

Taiwanese serial killer

- Born: 1972 (age 53–54); Taiwan
- Conviction: Murder (3 counts)
- Penalty: Death

Details
- Victims: 3
- Span of crimes: 1993–2003
- Country: Taiwan
- States: Miaoli, Chiayi, Taipei
- Date apprehended: August 8, 2003
- Imprisoned at: Taipei Detention Center

Chang Jen-bao (Chinese: 張人堡; born 1972) is a Taiwanese serial killer, who murdered three people from 1993 to 2003, including his cohabiting girlfriend. After the three cases were examined, he was sentenced to death by the Supreme Court on November 11, 2004. Chang is currently detained at the Taipei Detention Center, awaiting execution.

== Murders ==
=== Rape-murder in Miaoli (1993) ===
On August 14, 1993, while Chang was in military service in Miaoli County, he saw an 80-year-old woman walking alone. He then picked up a stick, beat the woman and then raped her. Afterwards, since he was afraid she would recognize him by his military uniform, he killed her by inserting a 52 cms long iron rod into her vagina. When he was arrested for the 2003 murder, he told the judge the following: "I wanted to see how the vagina of a teenage woman is different from the vagina of a woman in her eighties."

=== Murder of his mother's cohabitant (1994) ===
After the murder in Miaoli, he remained unknown. When he returned to Chiayi County the following year, he was dissatisfied with his mother's cohabitant, and so he punched and kicked the man, killing him as a result.

=== Taipei Shilin Box Corpse (2003) ===
After serving his sentence for nearly seven years, Chang settled in Taipei's Shilin District. There, he began interacting with a man named Yu and his girlfriend, who had ties in the drug business. On August 8, 2003, due to his dislike towards the girlfriend, Chang refused to help transport the drugs, with the woman then scratching his arm with a knife. Chang then took the knife and stabbed the woman in the chest three times, killing her and stuffing her body in a suitcase. The boxed body was then hung from the third floor residence with a rope. However, the rope broke off, and the suitcase fell and slammed loudly on the iron floor. Chang hid the suitcase in the fire escape. He then tried to take away the girlfriend's body away to the car, but her friends noticed her absence, so they called the police.

Chang was then arrested for the case. He refused to plead guilty in either of the three cases, showing no remorse for his crimes.

== Aftermath ==
In June 2004, the Shilin Court sentenced Chang Jen-bao to death concerning the Miaoli murder and Shilin murder. As of 2024, he is still under supervision by the Taipei Detention Center. Sometime between July and September 2024, the Taiwan Judicial Yuan is set to decide the constitutionality of the death penalty, which could waive the execution of Chang.

== See also ==
- List of serial killers by country
