= Wu Chen-huan =

Taiwanese politician

- 吳陳鐶
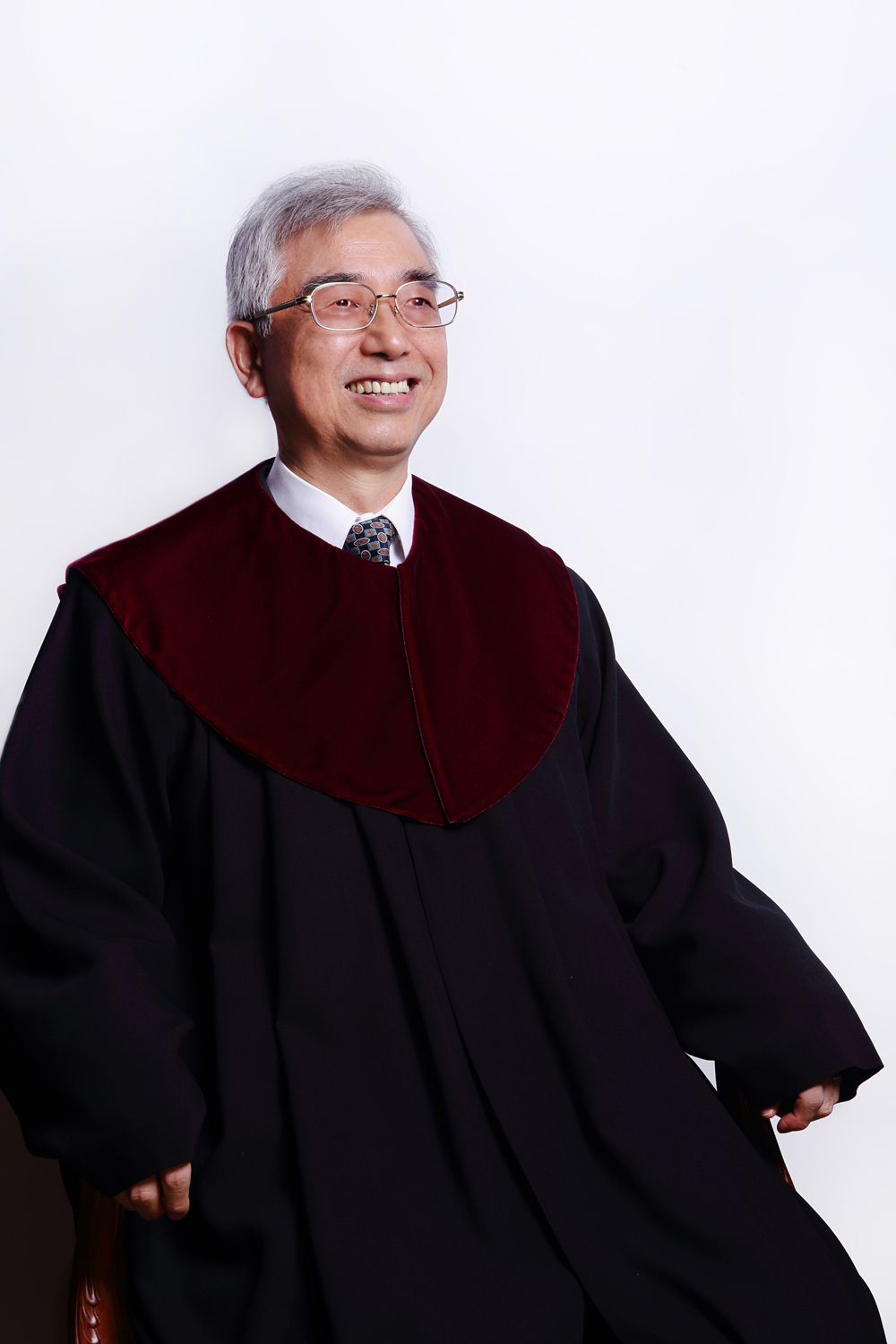

Political Deputy Minister of Justice of the Republic of China
- In office 1 January 2012 – September 2015
- Minister: Tseng Yung-fu; Chen Ming-tang (acting); Luo Ying-shay

Administrative Deputy Minister of Justice of the Republic of China
- In office May 2008 – December 2011
- Minister: Wang Ching-feng; Huang Shih-ming (acting); Tseng Yung-fu

Personal details
- Born: 28 September 1954 (age 71)
- Education: National Taipei University (LLB, LLM); American University (LLM); Bond University (PhD)

Wu Chen-huan (Chinese: 吳陳鐶; pinyin: Wú Chénhuán; born 28 September 1954) is a Taiwanese jurist. He was the Political Deputy Minister of the Ministry of Justice from 1 January 2012 until September 2015.

== Education ==
Wu obtained his bachelor's and master's degrees in law from National Taipei University, master's degree in law from American University in the United States and doctoral degree in legal science from Bond University in Australia.

== Ministry of Justice ==
Wu served in the Ministry of Justice as counselor from November 1995 until January 1998 and September 1998 until January 2000. He became the secretary-general of the ministry in June 2000, serving in this capacity until April 2002. From May 2008 until December 2011 he was the Administrative Deputy Minister and from January 2012 until September 2015 he was the Political Deputy Minister.

== See also ==
- Law of the Republic of China
