= The Journalist =

The Journalist may refer to:

- The Journalist (Bhutan), a weekly newspaper published in Bhutan.
- Journalist (British magazine), or The Journalist, a British newspaper and magazine
- The Journalist (newspaper), a 19th- and 20th-century American trade publication
- The Journalist (1967 film), a Soviet romantic drama
- The Journalist (1979 film), an Australian sex comedy
- The Journalist (2019 film), a Japanese drama
- The Journalist, a character in Yandere Simulator

== See also ==
- Journalist (disambiguation)
