= Yeh Chin-fong =

Taiwanese politician (born 1943)

- 葉金鳳

Minister of Justice of the Republic of China
- In office 1 February 1999 – 20 May 2000
- Deputy: Tseng Yung-fu
- Preceded by: Cheng Chung-mo
- Succeeded by: Chen Ding-nan

Ministry of the Interior of the Republic of China
- In office 15 May 1997 – 5 February 1998
- Preceded by: Lin Fong-cheng
- Succeeded by: Huang Chu-wen

Personal details
- Born: 22 June 1943 (age 83) Taichū, Taiwan, Empire of Japan
- Party: Kuomintang
- Education: National Chung Hsing University (LLB)

Yeh Chin-fong (Chinese: 葉金鳳; pinyin: Yè Jīnfèng; born 22 June 1943) is a Taiwanese politician. She was the Minister of Justice from 1999 to 2000.

== Minister of Justice ==
=== 1999 judicial person of the year ===
In January 2000, Yeh was chosen as the Judicial Person of the Year for 1999.

== 2001 Changhua County magistrate election ==
On 1 December 2001, Yeh joined the Changhua County magistrate election from Kuomintang. However, she lost to Democratic Progressive Party (DPP) candidate Wong Chin-chu.

2001 Changhua County Magistrate Election Result
No.	Party	Candidate	Votes	Percentage
1	PFP	Cheng Hsiu-chu (鄭秀珠)	39,056	6.37%
2	KMT	Yeh Chin-fong	257,504	41.99%
3	DPP	Wong Chin-chu	301,584	49.17%
4	Independent	Hong Can-min (洪參民)	8,219	1.34%
5	Independent	Chen Wan-zhen (陳婉貞)	6,934	1.13%
