= Luo Ying-shay =

Taiwanese politician (1951–2021)

- 羅瑩雪
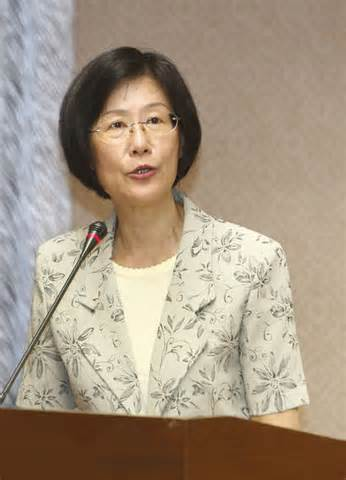
- Luo in 2012

Minister of Justice of the Republic of China
- In office 30 September 2013 – 20 May 2016
- President: Ma Ying-jeou
- Deputy: Chen Ming-tang; Wu Chen-huan
- Preceded by: Tseng Yung-fu; Chen Ming-tang (acting)
- Succeeded by: Chiu Tai-san

Governor of Fujian Province
- In office 1 August 2013 – 29 September 2013
- Preceded by: Chen Shyh-kwei
- Succeeded by: Schive Chi

Minister of the Mongolian and Tibetan Affairs Commission of the Executive Yuan
- In office 9 February 2011 – 29 September 2013
- Preceded by: Kao Su-po
- Succeeded by: Chen Ming-jen (acting); Jaclyn Tsai

Minister without Portfolio
- In office 9 February 2011 – 29 September 2013

Personal details
- Born: 8 November 1951 Taiwan
- Died: 3 April 2021 (aged 69) Taiwan
- Party: Kuomintang
- Education: National Taiwan University (LLB); University at Albany (MA)

Luo Ying-shay (Chinese: 羅瑩雪; pinyin: Luó Yíngxuě; 8 November 1951 – 3 April 2021) was a Taiwanese politician who served as the Minister of Justice from 30 September 2013 until 20 May 2016.

== Education ==
After high school, Luo attended law school at National Taiwan University, where she was classmates with Ma Ying-jeou. After graduating with an LL.B., she earned a master's degree in criminal justice from the University of Albany in the United States.

== Early career ==
After completing her education, Luo practiced law. Luo became a lecturer at the Central Police University in Taoyuan in 1977. She was an advocate of children's rights, and, during the 1990s, backed several amendments to the Child Welfare Act.

== ROC Mongolian and Tibetan Affairs Commission Ministry ==
=== Salute to Genghis Khan ===
In April 2012, Luo, on behalf of President Ma Ying-jeou, officiated a traditional ceremony to salute Genghis Khan of the Mongol Empire with some 200 Mongolians living in Taiwan. Luo said that Khan was a man with great talent and bold vision who broke ground and expanded frontiers. Luo and other dignitaries then offered flowers, incense and silk.

=== Merger of MTAC into MAC ===
In early April 2013, the plan to merge the Mongolian and Tibetan Affairs Commission (MTAC) with the Mainland Affairs Council (MAC) became an area of concern. Responding to the confusion, Luo said that the merger was not ideal, as approaching relations to Mongolia through the MAC might have caused the Mongolian government to believe that Taiwan's position was that Mongolia was a part of the People's Republic of China. Luo further clarified that direct Mongolia–Taiwan relations were diplomatic, while ethnic Mongolians and Tibetans in China and Taiwan were covered under Cross–Strait and domestic policies, respectively.

=== MTAC student exchange program ===
In early April 2013, Luo was questioned by Democratic Progressive Party (DPP) lawmaker Chen Chi-mai regarding the effectiveness of the MTAC-sponsored student exchange program from Taiwan to Inner Mongolia because most reports made of the trip by the Taiwanese students mentioned the ample drinking opportunities presented to them during the program. The DPP lawmaker even slammed Luo when he found out that one of the student reports said that "people from both side of the Taiwan Strait belong to one family".

Luo defended the program by stating that the drinking was only one of many other activities conducted during the student exchange program, which also included visits to historical and cultural sites. She also said that the students may have emphasized drinking because it was a novel experience they did not have in Taiwan.

== ROC Justice Ministry ==
=== Ministry appointment ===
The Executive Yuan announced Luo's appointment to become the Minister of Justice on 23 September 2013. She was the third woman to hold the post.

=== Taiwan inmates death sentence ===
On 29 April 2014, five convicts were executed after Luo gave the order to carry out the death sentences the day before, the first order since Luo took office as Minister of Justice in September 2013. Executions were done in prisons in Taipei, Taichung, Tainan and Hualien. The five executed inmates were Teng Kuo-liang (鄧國樑), Tu Ming-hsiung (杜明雄), Tu Ming-lang (杜明郎), Liu Yang-kuo (劉炎國) and Tai Wen-ching (戴文慶). They all had committed serious crimes including murders, sexual assaults and robberies. All of the five verdicts had received their final verdicts from the Supreme Court.

=== Visit to mainland China ===
On 28 March 2016, Luo departed to mainland China for a 5-day visit at the invitation of Supreme People's Procuratorate of the People's Republic of China becoming the first Justice Minister of the Government of the Republic of China to visit the mainland in her official capacity after the end of Chinese Civil War in 1949.

== Death ==
Luo died on 3 April 2021, aged 69. Although Kuomintang Culture and Communications Committee director-general Alicia Wang did not disclose a cause of death when announcing Luo's death, Luo had been diagnosed with breast cancer in 2013.
