= 2002 state visit by Chen Ding-nan to the United States =

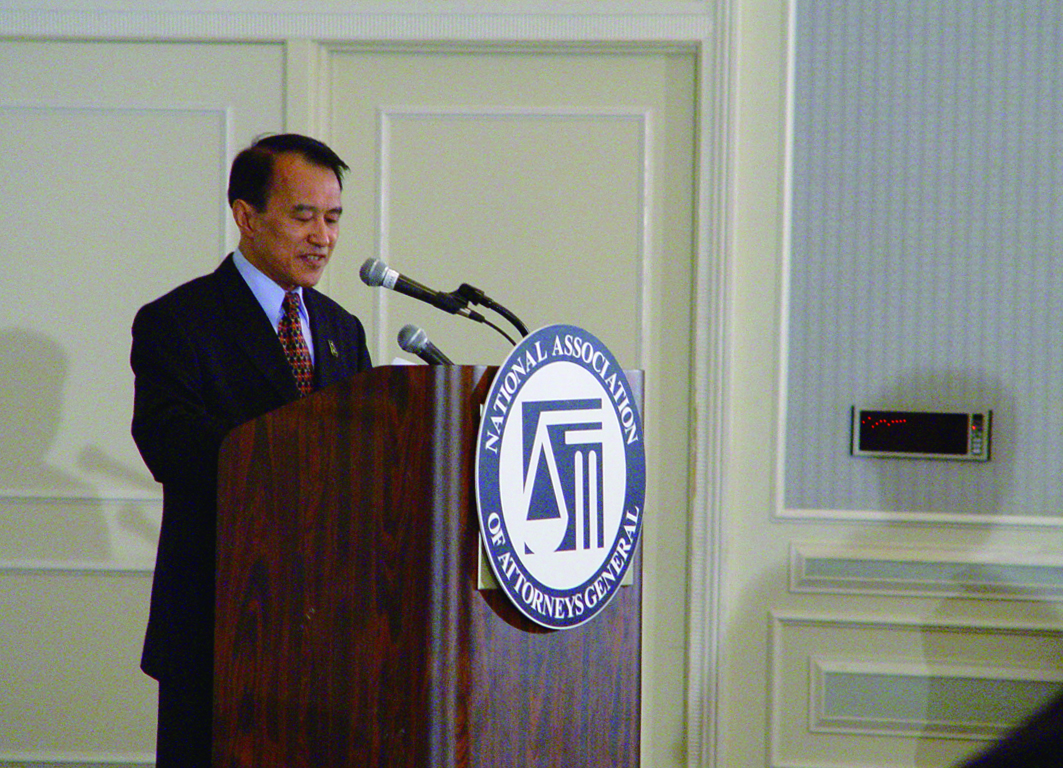
- Chen Ding-nan delivering a speech to the National Association of Attorneys General (NAAG) during his visit
- Native name: "就刑事司法互助等議題參訪美國司法部等有關機關及團體", Identification number "C09103647" in the Report archives of the Executive Yuan.
- Date: 9–13 July 2002
- Location: * The White House, Washington, D.C.; Harvard University; Yale University; New York City; Boston; The City of Los Angeles
- Cause: The September 11 attacks.; The signing of the "Agreement on Mutual Legal Assistance in Criminal Matters between the American Institute in Taiwan and the Taipei Economic and Cultural Representative Office in the United States" by Richard C. Bush III, chairman of American Institute in Taiwan (AIT), and representative Chen Chien-jen at the AIT headquarters in Arlington County.; See also: § Lead-up.
- Website: Report archives of the Executive Yuan (in Chinese)

The 2002 state visit by Chen Ding-nan to the United States involved discussing bilateral cooperation in law enforcement. The visit was headed by Chen Ding-nan, the Taiwanese Minister of Justice, with the highlight being the reception by his American counterpart John Ashcroft, Attorney General of the United States of America in the afternoon of 12 July 2002 local time (early morning of 13 July in Taipei time). Because of this visit, Chen became Taiwan's first government official after 1979 (when the United States cut its official diplomatic relations with Taiwan) to be invited into the White House.

== Meetings and visits ==
Other than with John Ashcroft, Chen met with ranking officials from the United States Department of Justice (such as the Drug Enforcement Administration (DEA) and the Federal Bureau of Investigation) and the United States Department of the Treasury (such as the Financial Crimes Enforcement Network), in order to discuss cooperation with regards to the legislation surrounding crime, in particular drug trafficking, commercial piracy, and global terrorism.

The visit included meetings with members of the United States House of Representatives such as congressmen Jim Sensenbrenner, Representative for the Fifth Congressional District of Wisconsin (at that time also chairman of the House Judiciary Committee) and John Conyers, Representative for the Thirteenth Congressional District of Michigan.

Other than visiting Washington, D.C., Chen visited Harvard University and Yale University and observed local community service programs for criminals and private prisons in New York City, Boston, and the City of Los Angeles.

Headed by Chen, the Taiwanese delegation also included the director of the Ministry of Justice's Prosecutorial Affairs Department Tsai Pi-yu, counselor to the Ministry of Justice Chang Tse-wei and Kuo Shih-sung, director of the Ministry of Justice Investigation Bureau.

The meetings were described to have been friendly and with active cooperation. The trip was described as successful, positive, and constructive by media and observers.

== Lead-up ==
The lead-up to the visit was the Agreement on Mutual Legal Assistance in Criminal Matters between Taiwan and the United States on 26 March 2002, the first judicial agreement signed between the countries, laying legal foundations for cooperation in crime investigation matters.

Reportedly, the lead up for the Agreement was the September 11 attacks, after which the United States Government wanted to take precautionary measures against terrorism, for which it asked for support from numerous countries, including Taiwan.

== Low-key visit due to the People's Republic of China's influence ==
It was claimed that, since Chen was a Minister of the Government of Taiwan, his visit to Washington and other cities of the United States of America would give rise to protest by the Chinese government and would impact the trilateral relations between the United States, the People's Republic of China and Taiwan. As far as media go, the trip had been characterized as a low-key visit, with neither media in Taiwan nor overseas announcing it loudly. The Chinese channel of the Voice of America cited Manfred Peng (Deputy Head of the Taipei Economic and Cultural Representative Office in the United States at that time) who claimed that it was not communicated whether or not Chen would meet senior officials during this visit, due to the "special relationship" between Taiwan and the United States by which, so he said, situations are generally not disclosed in advance. A Taiwanese newspaper also reported of such uncertainty, linking the unsureness of being able to meet Ashcroft in relation to the attention of the People's Republic of China to the trip. A documentary about Minister Chen details that, from the start, Minister Chen made it clear to the United States Government that he wanted to meet his counterpart, the Attorney General. Until the day before the meeting, it was reportedly unsure if Chen would be able to meet him, being told that the highest official the delegation would be able to meet would be the Deputy Attorney General. Finally the meeting with the Attorney General did occur.

While in the United States during his trip, Chen went to the Chinese Department of the Voice of America and was interviewed during its live-broadcast program called "時事大家談" (pinyin: shíshì dàjiā tán).

== Chen's comments about media in Taiwan ==
While answering questions from reporters in Washington, Chen accused the Taiwanese media of not striving for balanced reporting, illustrated by the reluctance of printing corrections and readers' letters, as well as of being immature, irresponsible, of breaching personal privacy and minimum levels of decency and respect. This lashing out created headlines in the Taiwanese media, reportedly overshadowing the coverage of the fact that he had been the first government official to be invited into the White House in twenty-three years.

== Abolition of the death penalty in Taiwan ==
One item which was communicated through local Taiwanese newspaper is that, during his visit, Ashcroft announced that Chen had made a policy statement of moving towards abolishing the death penalty but that, because most people in Taiwan at that time disapproved such an abolishment, it would, so he stated, occur as a phased approach, starting with the amending of the mandatory death penalty (Chinese: 絕對唯一死刑; pinyin: juéduì wéiyī sǐxíng).
