= New Taipei Municipal San-Chung Commercial and Industrial Vocational High School =

Coordinates: 25°04′10″N 121°28′52″E

Information
- School district: New Taipei City, Taiwan
- Enrollment: about 3394
- Affiliation: New Taipei City
- Website: http://www.scvs.ntpc.edu.tw/

New Taipei Municipal San-Chung Commercial and Industrial Vocational High School is an commercial and industrial high school district in the New Taipei City, Taiwan.

== Brief Introduction ==
Established in 1971, the school was originally named Taiwan Provincial San Chung Commercial and Industrial Vocational High School. Later, it was renamed National San Chung Commercial and Industrial Vocational High School. The school was classified into business and industrial categories,4 departments in each at first. The main goals of the school programs and curricula were designed especially for those students interested in learning technical skills and seeking a job in which these skills could be applied. In 1973, to meet the diverse needs of students and the people in the community, the Affiliated Night Division (evening school) was added, 5 departments included. In 1996, the Mechanical Drawing Department was added. In 2012, the school was again renamed New Taipei Municipal San Chung Commercial and Industrial Vocational High School with the administrative region adjustments. The current principal Dr. Ching-Kui Ni manages innovative changes for SCVS and is dedicated to raising the status of SCVS as a quality vocational senior high school in the Greater Taipei.

== Notable alumni ==
- Huang Lin-kai, convicted murderer and rapist who became the first inmate to be executed under President Lai Ching-te in January 2025. Attended the school until 2009.
