= Tsai Ching-hsiang =

Taiwanese politician and lawyer

- 蔡清祥
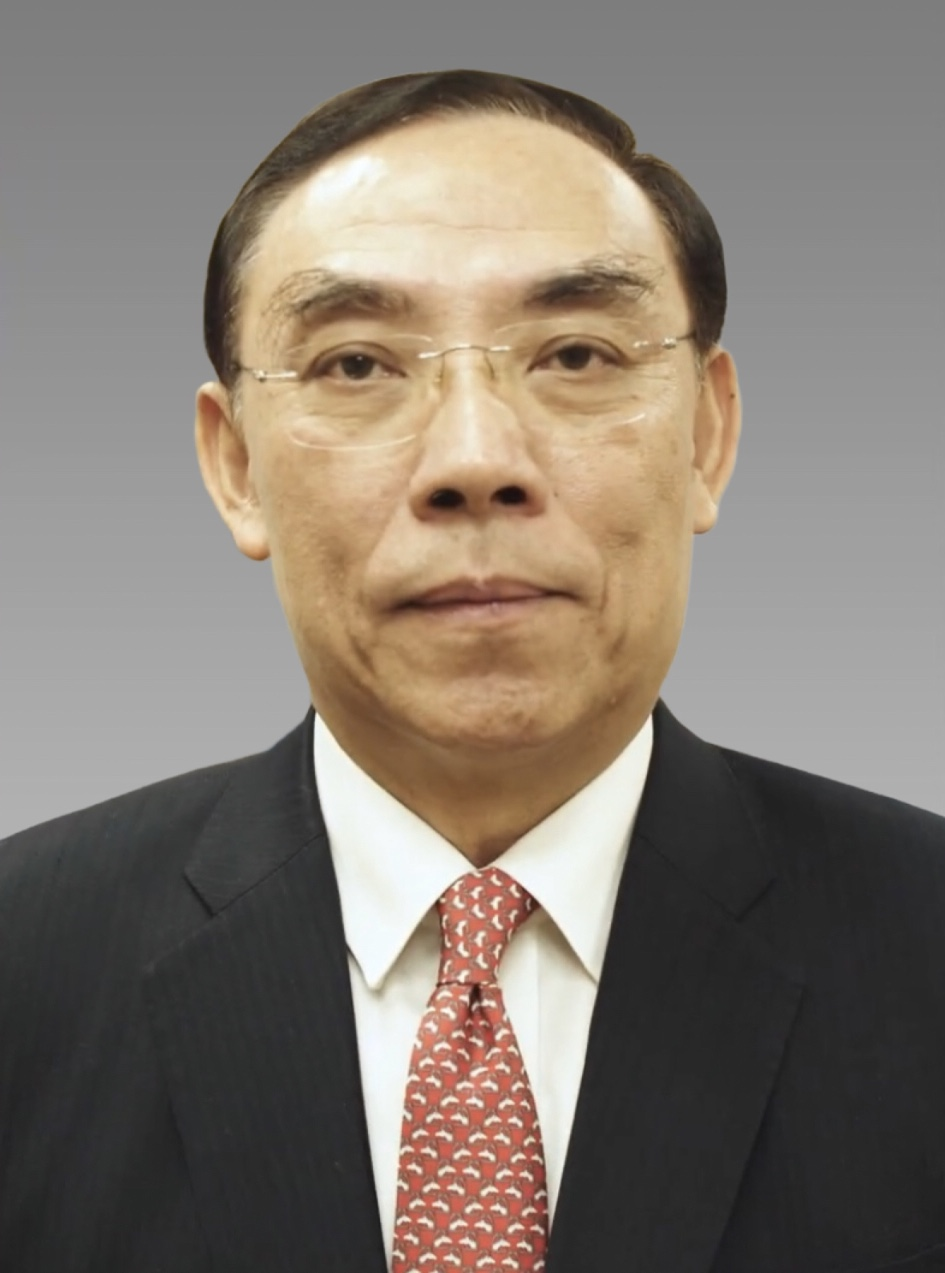

15th Minister of Justice
- In office 16 July 2018 – 20 May 2024
- Prime Minister: William Lai; Su Tseng-chang; Chen Chien-jen
- Deputy: Tsai Pi-chung; Chen Ming-tang
- Preceded by: Chiu Tai-san
- Succeeded by: Cheng Ming-chien

Director-General of the Investigation Bureau
- In office 5 August 2016 – 15 July 2018
- MOJ Minister: Chiu Tai-san
- Preceded by: Joey Chung-I Wang
- Succeeded by: Lin Lin-lan

Personal details
- Born: January 15, 1953 (age 73)
- Party: Independent
- Education: Soochow University (LLB); Chinese Culture University (LLM); National Taiwan University (MBA)

Tsai Ching-hsiang (Chinese: 蔡清祥; pinyin: Cài Qīngxiáng; born January 15, 1953) is a Taiwanese politician and lawyer. He has served as the Minister of Justice since 2018.

Before his ministerial career, he also served as the Director-General of the Investigation Bureau and the President of the Academy for the Judiciary of the Ministry of Justice. He is also known by the English name Shawn Tsai.

== Education ==
Tsai graduated from Soochow University with a Bachelor of Laws (LL.B.) degree and earned a Master of Laws (LL.M.) from Chinese Culture University in 1982. His master's degree thesis was titled, "A study of civil legal issues concerning public nuisance" (Chinese: 公害民事法律問題之研究).

After receiving his master's degree, Tsai became a visiting scholar at Harvard Law School. He later earned an executive Master of Business Administration (M.B.A.) from National Taiwan University.

== Career ==
Tsai served as head prosecutor in Kinmen and Miaoli, before taking office as the prosecutor-general of Keelung. He later led the Department of Prosecutorial Affairs at the Ministry of Justice. In this role, Tsai facilitated the extradition of Gerhard Dieter Rockmann to Germany and Wang You-theng from the United States. In mid-2007, Tsai was named head prosecutor of the Shilin District Prosecutors' Office. After leaving Shilin, Tsai served as lead prosecutor in Taoyuan and chief secretary of the justice ministry, followed by a stint as principal of the Judges Academy. He was subsequently named to the Supreme Prosecutors’ Office in July 2016. In 2016, Tsai was appointed director general of the Investigation Bureau. As bureau leader, Tsai investigated environmental damage and was especially known for leading drug busts. Tsai was respected for his high standards, efficiency, and personal leadership style. He was also known for his close relationship with William Lai.

=== Minister of Justice ===
Tsai was appointed Minister of Justice in July 2018, succeeding Chiu Tai-san. Tsai was formally sworn in on 16 July 2018.

On 31 August 2018, Tsai Ching-hsiang ordered the execution of convicted murderer Lee Hung-chi. Lee's death was the first execution carried out by the Tsai Ing-wen administration.
