= Chen Ding-nan =

Taiwanese politician and lawyer (1943–2006)

Chen Ding-nan MLY
- 陳定南
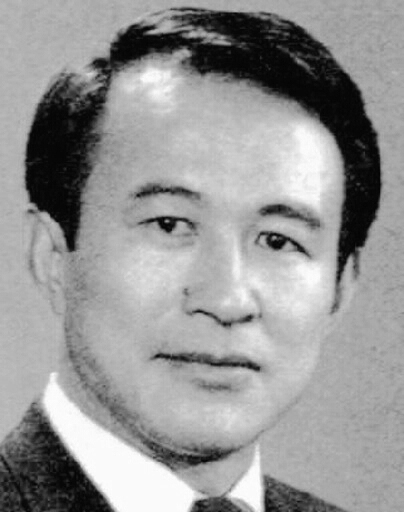

Minister without Portfolio of the Executive Yuan
- In office 20 May 2000 – 5 November 2006
- Prime Minister: Tang Fei; Chang Chun-hsiung; Yu Shyi-kun; Frank Hsieh; Su Tseng-chang

Minister of Justice
- In office 20 May 2000 – 1 February 2005
- Prime Minister: Tang Fei; Chang Chun-hsiung; Yu Shyi-kun
- Preceded by: Yeh Chin-fong
- Succeeded by: Shih Mau-lin

Member of the Legislative Yuan
- In office 1 February 1990 – 19 May 2000
- Constituency: Yilan County

Magistrate of Yilan County
- In office 20 December 1981 – 20 December 1989
- Preceded by: Lee Feng-ming
- Succeeded by: Yu Shyi-kun

Personal details
- Born: 29 September 1943 Sansei village, Ratō District, Taihoku Prefecture, Taiwan, Empire of Japan (modern-day Sanxing Township, Yilan County)
- Died: 5 November 2006 (aged 63) Taipei, Taiwan
- Party: Independent party candidate, Democratic Progressive Party
- Education: National Taiwan University (LLB)
- Profession: Lawyer

Chen Ding-nan
- Traditional Chinese: 陳定南
- Simplified Chinese: 陈定南
Transcriptions
Standard Mandarin
- Hanyu Pinyin: Chén Dìngnán
- Wade–Giles: Chén Tìng-nán
Southern Min
- Hokkien POJ: Tân Tēng-lâm
- Tâi-lô: Tân Tīng-lâm

Chen Ding-nan (29 September 1943 – 5 November 2006), sometimes transliterated Chen Ting-nan or referred to as David Chen, was a Taiwanese politician, lawyer, and environmentalist who served as Minister of Justice and was known as a leader of the country's anti-nuclear movement. Due to the 9–13 July 2002 state visit to the United States of America Chen became the first Taiwan government official since 1979 (when the United States cut its official diplomatic relations with Taiwan) to have been invited into the White House.

== Early life ==
In 1966, Chen obtained an undergraduate degree in law from the National Taiwan University. Consecutively, he fulfilled his military duty and then began a fourteen-year career in business, starting as a salesperson and then quickly becoming general manager and running various businesses before beginning an official political career.

The Lin family massacre (see Lin Yi-hsiung § Lin Family Massacre) on 28 February 1980 reportedly was a life-changing event for Chen and made him give up his business career and enter into politics. Reportedly, the massacre was the main reason for this career change. At the time of the Kaohsiung Incident (late 1979), Chen was still running the business of a successful shoe exporter. Even though Chen held a graduate degree in law, he never took the exam for lawyer or judge, reportedly because he witnessed dark sides during his military service as a martial judge. The outbreak of the massacre changed his mind, as it forced him to face the injustice in Taiwan's society. It has been claimed that Chen formulated his decision to give up his businesses as follows:

At that time, I told myself: Taiwan's society has become like this, what is the meaning of making a larger fortune? (Chinese: 「當時我告訴自己，台灣的社會已經變成這樣，賺再多錢有什麼意思？」)

— Chen Ding-Nan, after the Lin Family Massacre, 宜蘭經驗 陳定南從政傳奇

== Politics ==
Chen first got involved with politics due to connections with the Tangwai movement. His twenty-five-year political career officially started in 1981. By the end of this year, he was supported by the Tangwai movement and was elected magistrate of Yilan County as an independent party candidate with fifty-two percent of the votes, beating the Kuomintang candidate by a gap of 7000 votes. Thus Chen became the first non-KMT magistrate of Yilan County. Chen would hold the position for two terms (being re-elected with seventy percent of the votes), until 1989.

In 1993 he joined the Democratic Progressive Party so as to run for the provincial governor elections in 1994, but lost the elections in second position.
Cf.: § 1994 provincial governor elections.

A further career highlight includes serving three successive terms as a legislator for the Legislative Yuan, starting with being elected in the 1989 elections. During one of the re-elections periods, one of the supporting slogans was reportedly "Support Chen Ding-Nan, Stir Taiwan Province" (Chinese: 支持陳定南，轟動台灣省！). After his second term (commencing on 1 February 1993) and his third term (commencing in 1996), he renewed his term of office for a fourth administration (commencing on 1 February 1999) but left the post early on 20 May 2000 to take up his ministerial appointment.

In 2000, when the DPP came to power, Chen became Minister of Justice, heading the Taiwan's Ministry of Justice until 2005.

According to a 2002 article in The Journalist, Chen was part of what was referred to as the 'Ilan gang', a group of DPP officials associated with the New Tide faction in the party and having ties to Premier Yu Shyi-kun. Other members of the 'gang' included Chen Chu and Lee Kun-tse, all originally from Yilan as well.

In 2005, he ran again for the office of Magistrate of Yilan County but lost to the Kuomintang candidate Lu Kuo-hua.

After this defeat, Chen thanked his supporters, suggesting an end to his political career.

=== Policies ===
Chen is noted for introducing policy which made days off for national holidays more flexible. Many of his policy decisions reduced the control exerted or traditions enforced by the authoritarian Kuomintang-dominated central government. These choices included the 1986 announcement to end flag-raising ceremonies on New Year's Day, as well as the 1988 decision to stop enforcing the requirement that movie theatres play the national anthem before each film showing. He also removed the portraits of Chiang Kai-shek and Chiang Ching-kuo from government buildings such as schools, destroyed "loyalty records" kept of local public sector employees, and, within Yilan County Government, deactivated the Human Resources Second Office, alternatively known as the Second Section of Personnel Office, incorporated as a department of every public institution.

=== 1994 provincial governor elections ===
The first ever elections for the post of provincial governor of Taiwan, held on 3 December 1994, with a turnout of 76 percent, resulted in a clear favor of James Soong (56 percent of votes) of the Kuomintang, followed by Chen (39 percent) of the Democratic Progressive Party (DPP), Ju Gau-jeng (4 percent) of The New Party and the two remaining candidates, Wu Tzu of the Taiwan United People's Party and the independent Tsai Cheng-chih (1 percent for the two candidates combined).

For the first and only time during the 1990s, the KMT made corruption its main theme of attacking a candidate of the DPP, as Soong accused Chen of hiring land speculators and drug dealers as campaigners. Soong distributed a series of advertisements attacking Chen for corruption during his two terms as magistrate of Yilan County, containing slogans targeting Chen such as: 'number one at land speculation' (Chinese: 炒地他第一) and 'cultivating corruption expert series' (Chinese: 養貪高手系列) or depicting Chen in the gown of a judge with the Chinese character for 'speculation' (炒) on the gown. In response, Chen accused Soong of breaking the election law with these accusations. Furthermore, other than spreading their own advertisements accusing the Kuomintang of past false accusations, the DPP also responded with promoting Chen's record of fighting corruption as magistrate of Yilan County, for example by means of an advertisement showing a picture of Chen and Lee Kuan Yew of Singapore, with the slogan 'Choosing Chen Ting-nan equals Lee Kuan Yew becoming Provincial Governor' (Chinese: 選擇陳定南，等於李光耀當省長), insinuating how Chen had followed Lee's cracking down on corruption and discriminatory privileges.

=== Sober personal expenditure ===
Lee Kun-tse (Chinese: 李昆澤), who was Chen's chief secretary while the latter was justice minister, claimed that his former boss used the public bus as a general means of transportation, in contrast with other politicians of high ranks, and noted that he never spent over NT$70 on a meal and used the public train for his travels home to Yilan.

=== Anti-corruption efforts ===
A thirty-eight second long anti-corruption advertisement produced by the Ministry of Justice in 2001, at the time when Chen Ding-nan was Minister of Justice (featuring English or Chinese subtitles).

Immediately after assuming his post as Minister of Justice in 2000, Chan founded the 'Black Gold Investigation Center' (Chinese: 查緝黑金行動中心) under the Taiwan High Prosecutors Office in an attempt to reduce 'black gold'. The center would thus have four offices, in Taipei, Taichung, Tainan and Kaohsiung respectively. He set the strictest ever minimum amount for election bribery - NT$30.

In June 2004, Chen attempted to close the center down because it became difficult to secure funds. Due to opposition by Eric Chen (Chinese: 陳瑞仁), Hou Kuan-jen (Chinese: 侯寬仁) and Shen Ming-lun (Chinese: 沈明倫), the center's prosecutors, the center stayed open. In January 2005, three opposition lawmakers, which were being investigated by the center for alleged acts of bribery, threatened to cut down on the center's proposed NT$7,000,000 budget. This did not happen, as prosecutors shared this threat with reporters. Subsequently, other lawmakers and two non-governmental organizations also vouched their support for the center. Afterwards, the legislature approved the center's budget for 2005. In February 2005 some District Court prosecutors expressed their doubt on the importance of the center, claiming that its role overlaps with their own as part of the district anti-corruption task forces.

Chen was dubbed by the media as and known as 'Mr. Clean' (Chinese: 陳青天) due to his efforts to limit corruption. The Wall Street Journal Asia lauded Chen as 'Taiwan’s black gold nemesis' (Chinese: 台灣的黑金剋星), implying 'Taiwan’s anti-corruption star'. It has been claimed that Chen never accepted any lobby invitations during his political career.

=== Environmentalist ===
Political analyst Shih Cheng-fong claimed that Chen focused on the environmental protection of Yilan County's ecology, rather than transforming it into an industrial center. According to Shih, Chen insisted that efforts in environmental conservation, such as through the reduction of pollution, are important indicators of a county's progress, and that such progress can not be merely equated to economic growth.

=== Influence ===
According to the 'Chen Ding-nan Educational Foundation', in 1988, the CommonWealth Magazine (Chinese: 天下雜誌) listed Chen as one of the fifty most influential persons in the history of Taiwan.

When DPP candidate Lin Tsung-hsien won the 2009 elections for the Yilan County magistrate, certain media attributed his success partly due to the handing over of Chen's briefcase to Lin by Chen's widow Chang Chao-yi (Chinese: 張昭義), seen as a gesture symbolizing her endorsement for the candidate.

In 2015, while William Lai was still mayor of Tainan, Lai noted that he saw Chen as the embodiment of integer and diligent government. The media noted that Lai has often said that his political career is greatly influenced by Chen and that he has literally pledged to carry on 'the spirit of Chen Ding-nan' in his own governance.

== Death ==
After the race for the 2005 Yilan County magistrate elections, Chen's health quickly worsened, suffering a constant fever. In April 2006 he was diagnosed with late stage lung adenocarcinoma, a type of lung cancer, after which he was hospitalized multiple times. After two treatments of chemotherapy, doctors stopped the treatment, resorting to an organic diet and Qigong. On 19 October 2006 he was admitted to the hospital with fluid in his lungs and on 6 November 2006, aged 63, he died due to cancer-related causes in the National Taiwan University Hospital.

Chen left instructions asking for no shrine with his portrait to be arranged and no wake to be held for him. Also, he left instructions that his body must be cremated within 72 hours (3 days), and to sprinkle part of his ashes into the Yilan lands and some placed beside his family graveyard. Eventually, due to legal restrictions and the offer from Yilan County Government on making a special project for tree burial that did not match Chen's personality, his ashes were fully buried in his family graveyard in Yilan.

== Commemoration ==
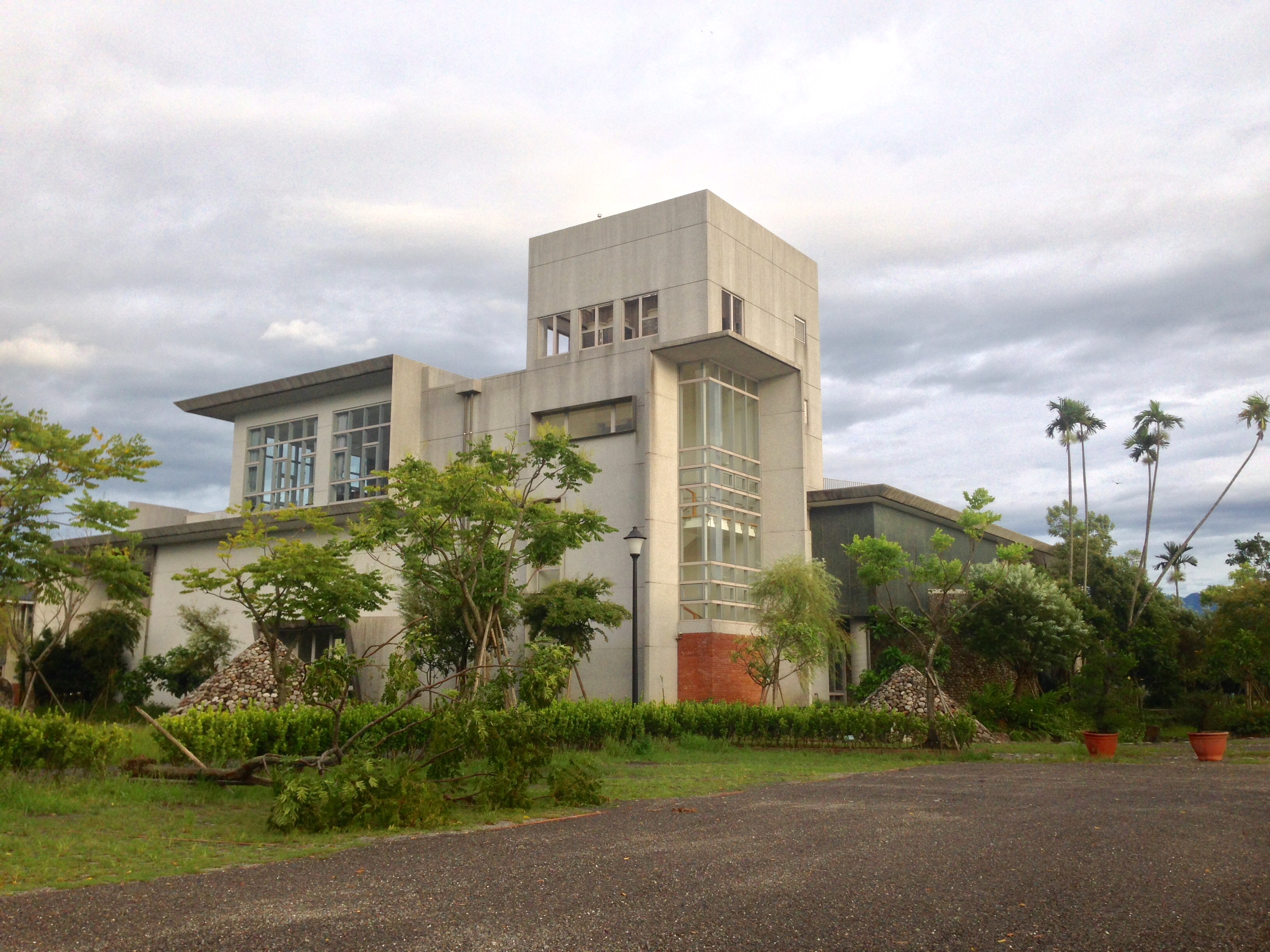
Chen Ding-nan Memorial Hall in Yilan County. Photographed in September 2016.

After Chen's death, the Chen Ding-nan Educational Foundation (Chinese: 陳定南教育基金會) was established. The foundation published a biography of Chen in November 2007, An Official with an Esteemed Personality. It also raised funds for the construction of a memorial park near his former residence in Sanxing Township. On 5 November 2011, marking five years since Chen's death, such a park opened under attendance of Taiwan Solidarity Union Chairman Huang Kun-huei, amongst others, receiving the name of 'Chen Ding-nan Memorial Hall' (Chinese: 陳定南紀念館).

The memorial, to which the admission is free of charge, preserved the house of his birth and new structures were added by architect Huang Chien-hsing (Chinese: 黃建興), while the landscape was designed by Toshiya Ishimura. Its exhibition hall documents Chen's life and features an artwork depicting Chen's portrait by artist Wang Chun-lung (Chinese: 王俊隆).

Government offices
Preceded by Lee Feng-ming	Magistrate of Yilan County; 1981–1989	Succeeded by Yu Shyi-kun
Preceded by Yeh Chin-fong	ROC Minister of Justice; 2000–2005	Succeeded by Morley Shih
