= 1996 Taiwanese presidential election =

- 23 March 1996
- Registered: 14,313,288
- Turnout: 76.04%
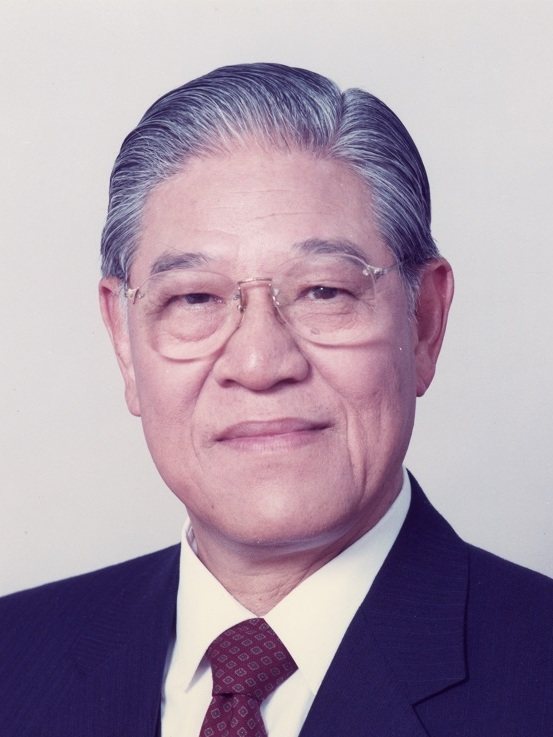

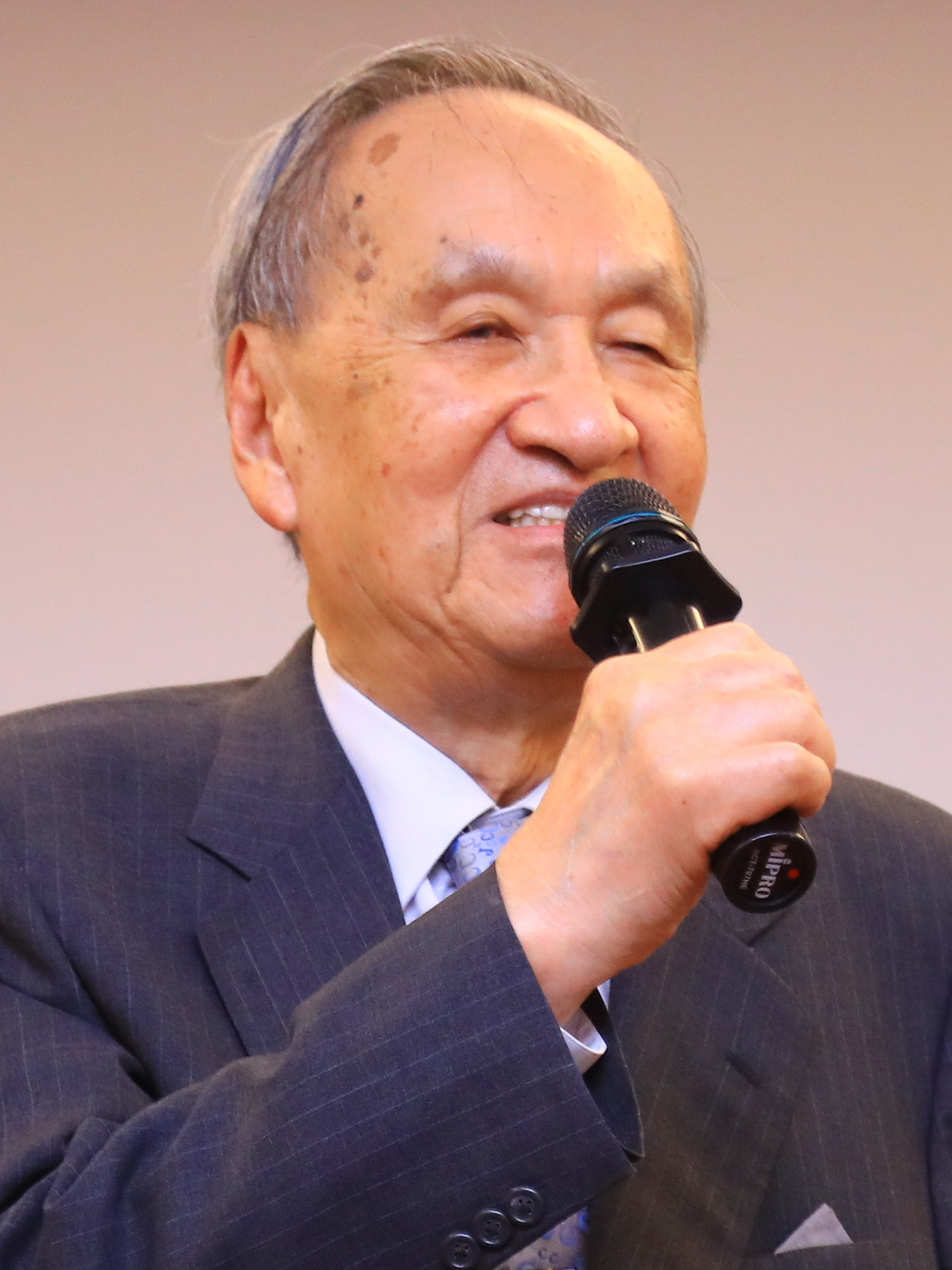

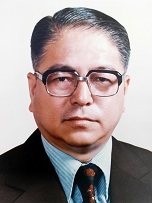

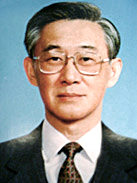
Nominee	Lee Teng-hui	Peng Ming-min
Party	KMT	DPP
Running mate	Lien Chan	Frank Hsieh
Popular vote	5,813,699	2,274,586
Percentage	54.00%	21.13%
Nominee	Lin Yang-kang	Chen Li-an
Party	Independent	Independent
Running mate	Hau Pei-tsun	Wang Ching-feng
Popular vote	1,603,790	1,074,044
Percentage	14.90%	9.98%
President before election
Lee Teng-hui
KMT
Elected President
Lee Teng-hui
KMT

Presidential elections were held in Taiwan on 23 March 1996. It was Taiwan's first direct presidential election, officially the Republic of China. In the previous eight elections, the president and vice president had been chosen in a ballot of the deputies of the National Assembly, in accordance with the 1947 constitution. These were the first free and direct elections in the history of Taiwan.

Lee Teng-hui was re-elected President, and Lien Chan as Vice President. Lee stood as the candidate for the ruling Kuomintang. He won a majority of 54% of the votes cast. His election followed missile tests by the People's Republic of China (PRC). These attempted to intimidate and discourage the Taiwanese electorate from supporting Lee; however, the tactic backfired. Voter turnout was 76.0%.

== Candidates ==
The ruling Kuomintang nominated President Lee Teng-hui in August 1995 at its 14th Party Congress after plans to institute a closed primary system by his opponents were thwarted. As his running mate, Lee chose Lien Chan, who had attempted to resign as Premier of the Republic of China, to join Lee's ticket. Lee did not accept Lien's resignation, as Lien's potential successors to the premiership stood little chance of legislative confirmation. After the election, the Judicial Yuan allowed Lien to keep both posts.

The opposition Democratic Progressive Party conducted an extensive nomination process: the presidential candidate was selected after two rounds of voting and fifty public debates between the two finalists. Hsu Hsin-liang, Lin Yi-hsiung, You Ching, and Peng Ming-min contended for this position. The seventy-two-year-old Peng emerged victorious and nominated legislator Frank Hsieh as his running mate. Peng opposed trade with mainland China unless the PRC promised to "treat Taiwan as an equal." Though he argued that the One-China policy would lead to another February 28 Incident, he took the position that Taiwan was already de facto independent, so a formal declaration of Taiwan independence was unnecessary unless the PRC attacked. However, Peng rejected unification with the mainland outright, describing the notion as "suicide" and "self-destruction."

Former Taiwan Provincial Governor Lin Yang-kang ran independently with former Premier Hau Pei-tsun as his running mate. After the pair registered as candidates, they were endorsed by the New Party. Both Lin and Hau were expelled from the Kuomintang on 13 December 1995. They supported the One-China principle and favored opening direct links with the mainland. They argued that the KMT, led by Lee, had abandoned all attempts at unification.

A second independent ticket consisted of former Control Yuan President Chen Li-an for president and Control Yuan member Wang Ching-feng for vice president. Chen Li-an, the son of former Premier and Vice President Chen Cheng, used his Buddhist background (lay leader of the Fo Guang Shan order) and stressed moral purity and honest government. He walked wearing a farmer's straw hat for eighteen days to spread his views.

Former Taipei mayor Kao Yu-shu declared an end to his candidacy in January 1996. Feminist writer Shih Chi-ching also bid for the presidency, selecting Wu Yue-chen as her vice president. However, Shih and Wu's campaign ended after the Judicial Yuan ruled against them, finding that the ticket failed to meet the endorsement quota. Mudslinging was rampant between the remaining four presidential tickets. The KMT claimed that the Taiwanese mafia had amputated Peng's arm to recoup gambling debts. However, Peng had lost his arm in an American air raid on Nagasaki during World War II. Independent candidate Lin Yang-kang alleged that Lee Teng-hui was a member of the Chinese Communist Party, which he denied at the time, but later admitted involvement in a 2002 interview. The Kuomintang's website was also subject to cyberattacks. Chen Li-an criticized every other candidate for their advanced age.

== 1996 Taiwan Strait Crisis ==
From March 8 to March 15, the People's Liberation Army sent ballistic missiles within 46 to 65 km (25 to 35 nmi) (just inside the ROC's territorial waters) off the ports of Keelung and Kaohsiung. This action was intended to intimidate the Taiwanese electorate into voting against Lee and Peng, which Beijing branded "absolutely identical in attempting to divide the motherland." Similarly, Chen Li-an warned, "If you vote for Lee Teng-hui, you are choosing war." The crisis ended when two U.S. aircraft carrier battle groups were positioned near Taiwan.

Lee, who told his people to resist "state terrorism," was seen as a strong leader who could negotiate with the PRC. Because of this, many constituents from southern Taiwan who favored independence voted for him. One Taipei newspaper, United Daily News, reported that up to 14 to 15 percent of Lee's 54% vote share came from DPP supporters.

== Results ==
Candidate	Running mate	Party	Votes	%
Lee Teng-hui	Lien Chan	Kuomintang	5,813,699	54.00
Peng Ming-min	Frank Hsieh	Democratic Progressive Party	2,274,586	21.13
Lin Yang-kang	Hau Pei-tsun	Independent	1,603,790	14.90
Chen Li-an	Wang Ching-feng	Independent	1,074,044	9.98
Total			10,766,119	100.00
Valid votes			10,766,119	98.92
Invalid/blank votes			117,160	1.08
Total votes			10,883,279	100.00
Registered voters/turnout			14,313,288	76.04
Source: CEC

=== By administrative division ===
Subdivision	Electorate	1		2		3		4		Invalid	Turnout	Margin
Subdivision	Electorate	Chen Li-an		Lee Teng-hui		Peng Ming-min		Lin Yang-kang		Invalid	Turnout	Margin
Subdivision	Electorate	Wang Ching-feng		Lien Chan		Frank Hsieh		Hau Pei-tsun		Invalid	Turnout	Margin
Subdivision	Electorate	Votes	%	Votes	%	Votes	%	Votes	%	Invalid	Turnout	Margin
Taipei City	1,842,261	165,541	11.89%	541,721	38.90%	338,895	24.34%	346,272	24.87%	12,522	76.26%	202,826
Taipei County	2,166,016	186,973	11.37%	793,718	48.28%	370,728	22.55%	292,541	17.79%	17,074	76.69%	422,990
Keelung City	254,276	25,950	13.42%	97,223	50.27%	34,256	17.71%	35,978	18.60%	1,747	76.75%	62,967
Yilan County	313,770	20,573	8.94%	126,405	54.92%	68,044	29.56%	15,154	6.58%	2,063	74.02%	58,361
Taoyuan County	985,365	91,048	12.02%	423,198	55.85%	114,901	15.16%	128,607	16.97%	9,955	77.91%	308,297
Hsinchu County	270,365	24,746	11.67%	140,321	66.20%	23,555	11.11%	23,342	11.01%	3,051	79.53%	116,766
Hsinchu City	226,574	22,603	12.93%	93,812	53.65%	28,281	16.17%	30,155	17.25%	2,031	78.07%	65,531
Miaoli County	376,581	29,884	10.31%	202,593	69.87%	31,036	10.70%	26,459	9.12%	3,795	78.01%	171,557
Taichung County	897,357	71,030	10.01%	426,668	60.15%	115,034	16.22%	96,594	13.62%	9,099	80.06%	311,634
Taichung City	555,794	46,844	11.11%	195,865	46.45%	82,416	19.55%	96,509	22.89%	4,084	76.60%	113,449
Changhua County	841,294	62,138	9.70%	407,820	63.63%	116,154	18.12%	54,776	8.55%	8,412	77.18%	291,666
Nantou County	371,630	14,552	5.31%	86,357	31.52%	45,556	16.63%	127,537	46.55%	2,786	74.48%	40,801
Yunlin County	521,592	25,914	7.22%	237,871	66.29%	68,785	19.17%	26,247	7.31%	4,343	69.63%	169,086
Chiayi County	398,362	17,515	6.37%	180,709	65.70%	63,101	22.94%	13,716	4.99%	3,105	69.82%	117,608
Chiayi City	175,137	12,761	9.90%	60,628	47.04%	42,984	33.35%	12,515	9.71%	1,130	74.24%	17,644
Tainan County	742,953	41,263	7.48%	347,825	63.05%	134,969	24.47%	27,590	5.00%	5,686	75.02%	212,856
Tainan City	469,463	39,058	10.97%	201,436	56.58%	84,929	23.85%	30,603	8.60%	3,136	76.50%	116,507
Kaohsiung City	952,202	68,158	9.29%	371,391	50.62%	200,406	27.32%	93,691	12.77%	7,089	77.79%	170,985
Kaohsiung County	809,157	47,790	7.64%	374,386	59.88%	151,943	24.30%	51,139	8.18%	6,210	78.04%	222,443
Pingtung County	623,207	26,644	5.78%	289,812	62.91%	117,283	25.46%	26,902	5.84%	4,752	74.68%	172,529
Taitung County	176,313	8,160	7.52%	74,211	68.42%	14,506	13.37%	11,584	10.68%	1,709	62.49%	59,705
Hualien County	245,715	14,568	8.91%	104,740	64.05%	18,383	11.24%	25,836	15.80%	2,364	67.51%	86,357
Penghu County	63,533	4,170	10.29%	25,367	62.61%	8,070	19.92%	2,907	7.18%	563	64.65%	17,297
Kinmen County	30,476	5,805	28.09%	8,401	40.65%	336	1.63%	6,123	29.63%	401	69.12%	8,065
Lienchiang County	3,895	356	13.56%	1,221	46.51%	35	1.33%	1,013	38.59%	53	68.75%	1,186
Source: CEC Overview Table CEC Visual Query

=== Maps ===

Result by County level

Result by Township level

Vote leader and vote share in township-level districts.

Vote leader in county-level districts.

National winner vote lead over national runner-up by township/city or district (Note: Lee did not lead in all township-level units.)

- Blue: Lee-Lien ticket; Yellow: Lin-Hau ticket
