= Chen Ming-tang =

Taiwanese lawyer

- 陳明堂
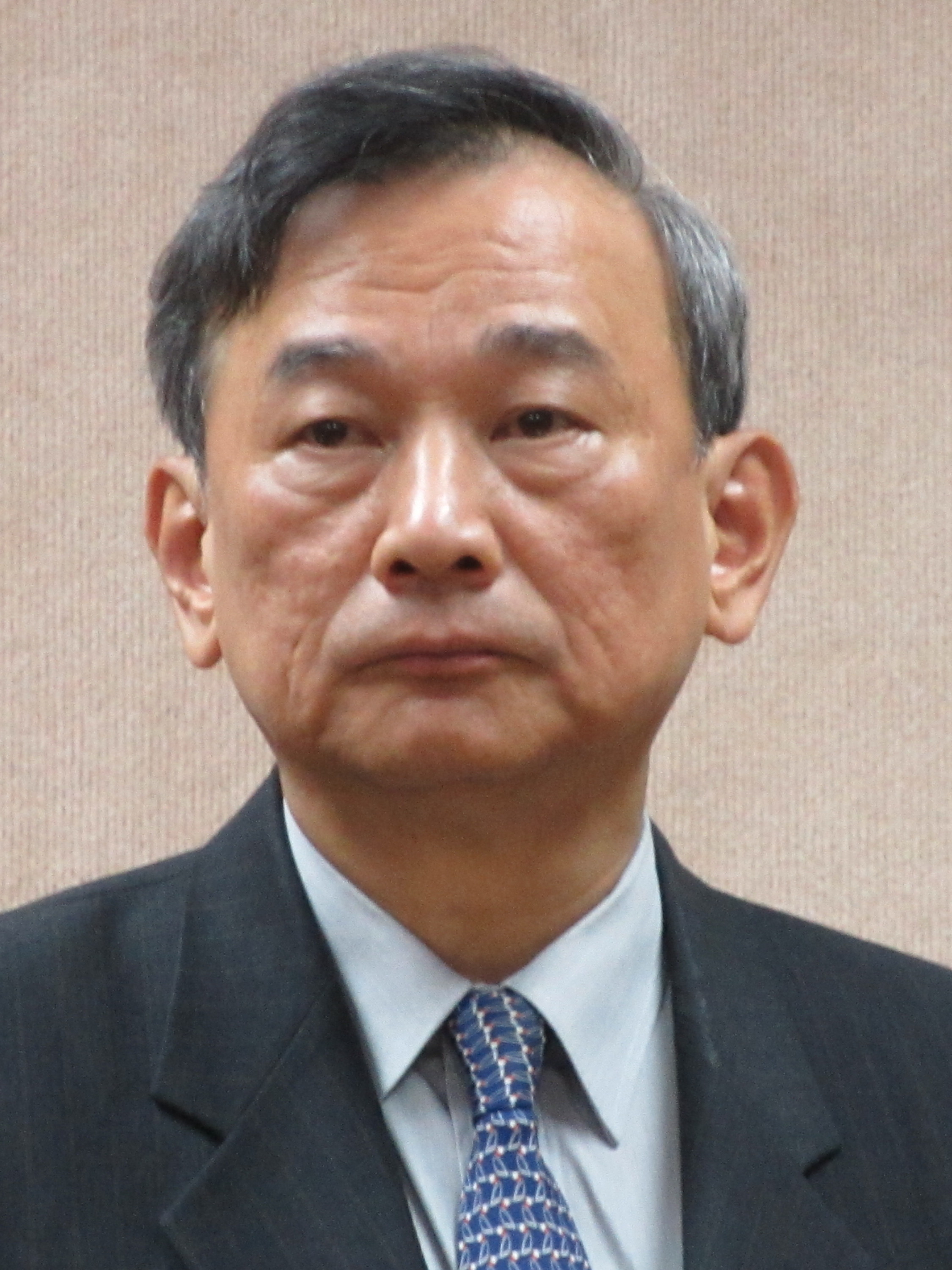

Deputy Minister of Justice
- In office 30 September 2013 – 20 May 2024 Serving with Tsai Pi-chung
- Minister: Luo Ying-shay; Chiu Tai-san; Tsai Ching-hsiang
- Deputy: Wu Chen-huan
- Succeeded by: Huang Shih-chieh

Minister of Justice
- Acting; 6 September 2013 – 29 September 2013
- Prime Minister: Jiang Yi-huah
- Deputy: Wu Chen-huan
- Preceded by: Tseng Yung-fu
- Succeeded by: Luo Ying-shay

Administrative Deputy Minister of Justice
- In office 11 March 2013 – 6 September 2013
- Minister: Tseng Yung-fu
- Deputy: Wu Chen-huan

Personal details
- Party: Independent
- Education: Soochow University (LLB); Chinese Culture University (LLM); National Taiwan Ocean University (PhD)

Chen Ming-tang (traditional Chinese: 陳明堂; simplified Chinese: 陈明堂; pinyin: Chén Míngtáng) is a Taiwanese lawyer. He served as the Administrative Deputy Minister of Justice in the Executive Yuan since from 2013 to 2024. In September 2013, he briefly became the acting Minister of Justice after incumbent Minister Tseng Yung-fu's sudden resignation.

== Education ==
Chen graduated from Soochow University with a Bachelor of Laws (LL.B.) in 1967, then earned his Master of Laws (LL.M.) degree from Chinese Culture University and, in 2017, his Ph.D. in ocean law from National Taiwan Ocean University. His doctoral dissertation was titled, "A Study on the Legalization of International Conventions in Taiwan – Focusing on Human Rights and Maritime Law".

== ROC Justice Administrative Deputy Ministry ==
=== Chen Shui-bian prison transfer ===
In mid-April 2013, Deputy Minister Chen confirmed that former ROC president Chen Shui-bian was transferred from Taipei Veterans General Hospital to Pei-de Hospital in Taichung Prison, where he will serve his remaining 20 years of sentence there. Deputy Minister Chen added that this transfer was made to ensure former president Chen's proper medical attention, in which it was made in consideration of him being prison inmate, patient and a former president.

=== Taiwanese fisherman shooting incident ===
Responding to the shooting incident of Taiwanese fisherman by Philippine government vessel on 9 May 2013 at the disputed water in South China Sea, in end of May 2013, Chen said that the ROC MOJ has declined Philippine request for bilateral judicial assistance because Manila refusal of handing over the incident video to ROC government, although they have agreed to allow Taiwanese investigators to board the Philippine Coast Guard vessel involved in the shooting incident.

== See also ==
- Law of the Republic of China
