= Cheng Ming-chien =

Taiwanese lawyer and politician

- 鄭銘謙
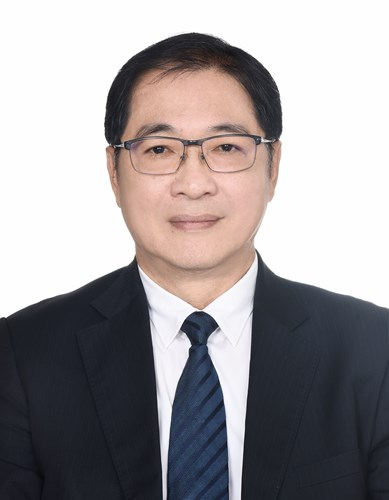
- Official portrait, 2024

16th Minister of Justice
- Incumbent
- Assumed office 20 May 2024
- Prime Minister: Cho Jung-tai
- Preceded by: Tsai Ching-hsiang
Previous offices
27th Chief Prosecutor of Taipei
In office 3 May 2023 – 20 May 2024
Justice Minister	Tsai Ching-hsiang
Preceded by	Lin Ban-liang
Succeeded by	Tsai Wei-yi (acting)
5th Director-General of the Agency Against Corruption
In office 31 January 2019 – 19 May 2022
Justice Minister	Tsai Ching-hsiang
Preceded by	Chu Chia-chi
Succeeded by	Chuang Rong-sung
25th Chief Prosecutor of Yunlin
In office 7 May 2015 – 8 July 2018
Justice Minister	Luo Ying-shay; Chiu Tai-san
Preceded by	Hung Pei-gen
Succeeded by	Cheng Hsin-hung

Personal details
- Born: 12 October 1958 (age 68) Taiwan
- Party: Independent
- Education: National Chung Hsing University (LLB)

Cheng Ming-chien (Chinese: 鄭銘謙; born 12 October 1958) is a Taiwanese lawyer and politician who has served as Minister of Justice since 2024.

Cheng earned a bachelor's degree in law from National Chung Hsing University.

He led the Ministry of Justice's Agency Against Corruption, was deputy head of the MOJ department of legal affairs, and served as chief prosecutor of Tainan, Yunlin, and Taipei before his appointment as Minister of Justice on 12 April 2024, by premier-designate Cho Jung-tai.
