= Lee Yuan-tsu =

Vice President of the Republic of China (1923–2017)

- 李元簇
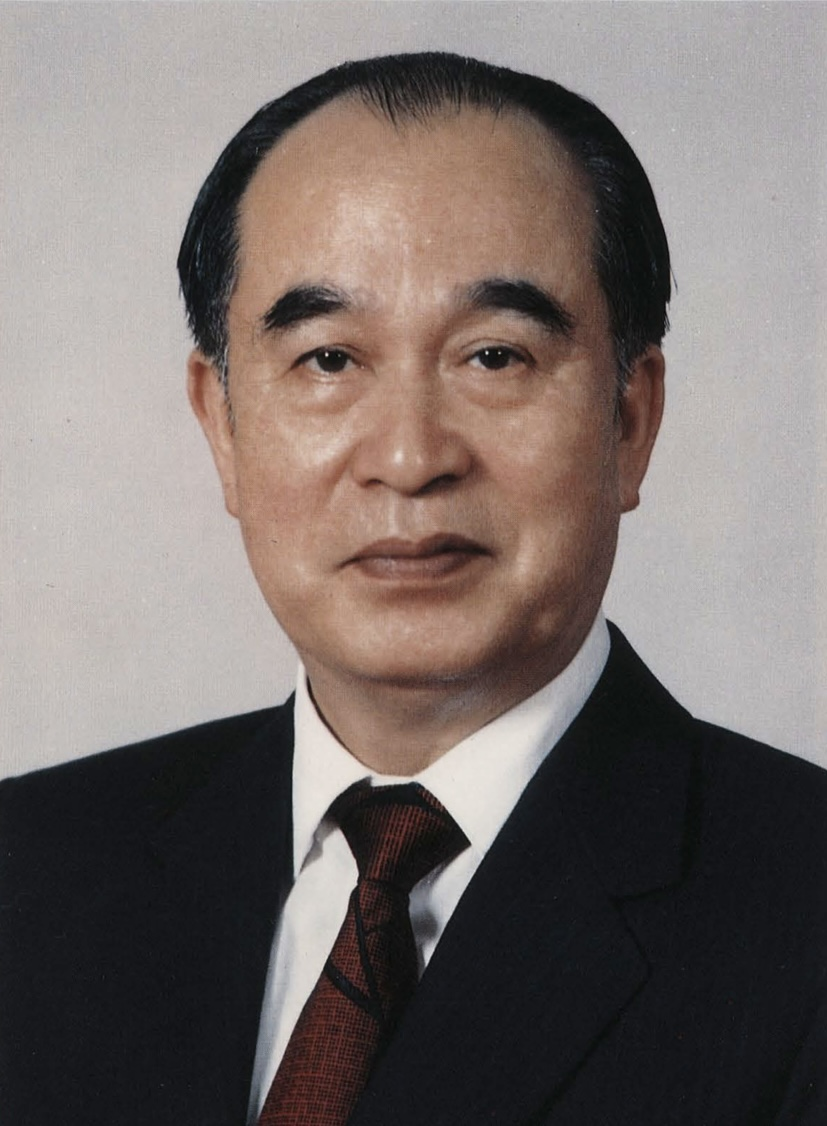
- Official portrait, 1990

6th Vice President of the Republic of China
- In office 20 May 1990 – 19 May 1996
- President: Lee Teng-hui
- Preceded by: Lee Teng-hui
- Succeeded by: Lien Chan

Secretary-General to the President
- In office 18 October 1988 – 19 May 1990
- President: Lee Teng-hui
- Deputy: Cheyne J. Y. Chiu
- Preceded by: Shen Chang-huan
- Succeeded by: Chiang Yen-si

Minister of Justice
- In office 30 May 1978 – 1 June 1984
- Premier: Hsu Ching-chung (acting); Sun Yun-suan
- Preceded by: Wang Daoyuan (汪道淵)
- Succeeded by: Shih Chi-yang

Minister of Education
- In office 19 April 1974 – 29 May 1978
- Premier: Chiang Ching-kuo; Hsu Ching-chung (acting)
- Preceded by: Chiang Yen-si (蔣彥士)
- Succeeded by: Chu Hui-sen (朱匯森)

Personal details
- Born: 24 September 1923 Pingjiang, Yueyang, Hunan, Republic of China
- Died: 8 March 2017 (aged 93) Toufen, Miaoli, Taiwan
- Party: Kuomintang
- Spouse: Xu Manyun (c.1948— January 1998)
- Education: National Chengchi University (LLB, LLM); University of Bonn (PhD)

Lee Yuan-tsu (Chinese: 李元簇; pinyin: Lǐ Yuáncù; Wade–Giles: Li^{3} Yüan^{2}-tsʻu^{4}; 24 September 1923 — 8 March 2017) was a Taiwanese lawyer and politician who served under Lee Teng-hui as the sixth vice president of the Republic of China. He was of Hakka ancestry and was a member of the Kuomintang.

== Early life and education ==
Lee was born in Pingjiang, Hunan, in 1923 to a Hakka Chinese family. His ancestral home was in Meixian, Guangdong.

Lee graduated from National Chengchi University with a bachelor's degree in law and political science in 1946. In 1949, after the Chinese Civil War, he migrated to Taiwan from mainland China during the Great Retreat with the National Revolutionary Army. In 1963, he earned a Ph.D. in law from the University of Bonn in Germany in 1963.

== Political career ==
Lee entered politics in 1969 when he became a legal consultant for the Ministry of National Defense. He served as Minister of Education from 1974 to 1978, then Minister of Justice until 1984 and Secretary-General to the President between 1988 and 1990.

He was nominated by Lee Teng-hui to be the Vice President of the Republic of China after the death of President Chiang Ching-kuo in 1988. In 1989, President Lee stated that his vice president must be a Mainland Chinese. Eventually Lee Yuan-tsu was elected as the Vice President by the National Assembly on 21 March 1990, becoming the last vice president to be elected by the National Assembly before the introduction of direct presidential and vice presidential elections in Taiwan afterwards. He took office on 20 May 1990 serving until 19 May 1996.

== Retirement ==
After retiring from politics in 1996, Lee resumed his teaching position at National Chengchi University. His wife died in 1998. Eventually, he moved to Toufen in Miaoli County, where he lived a low-profile life.

== Death ==
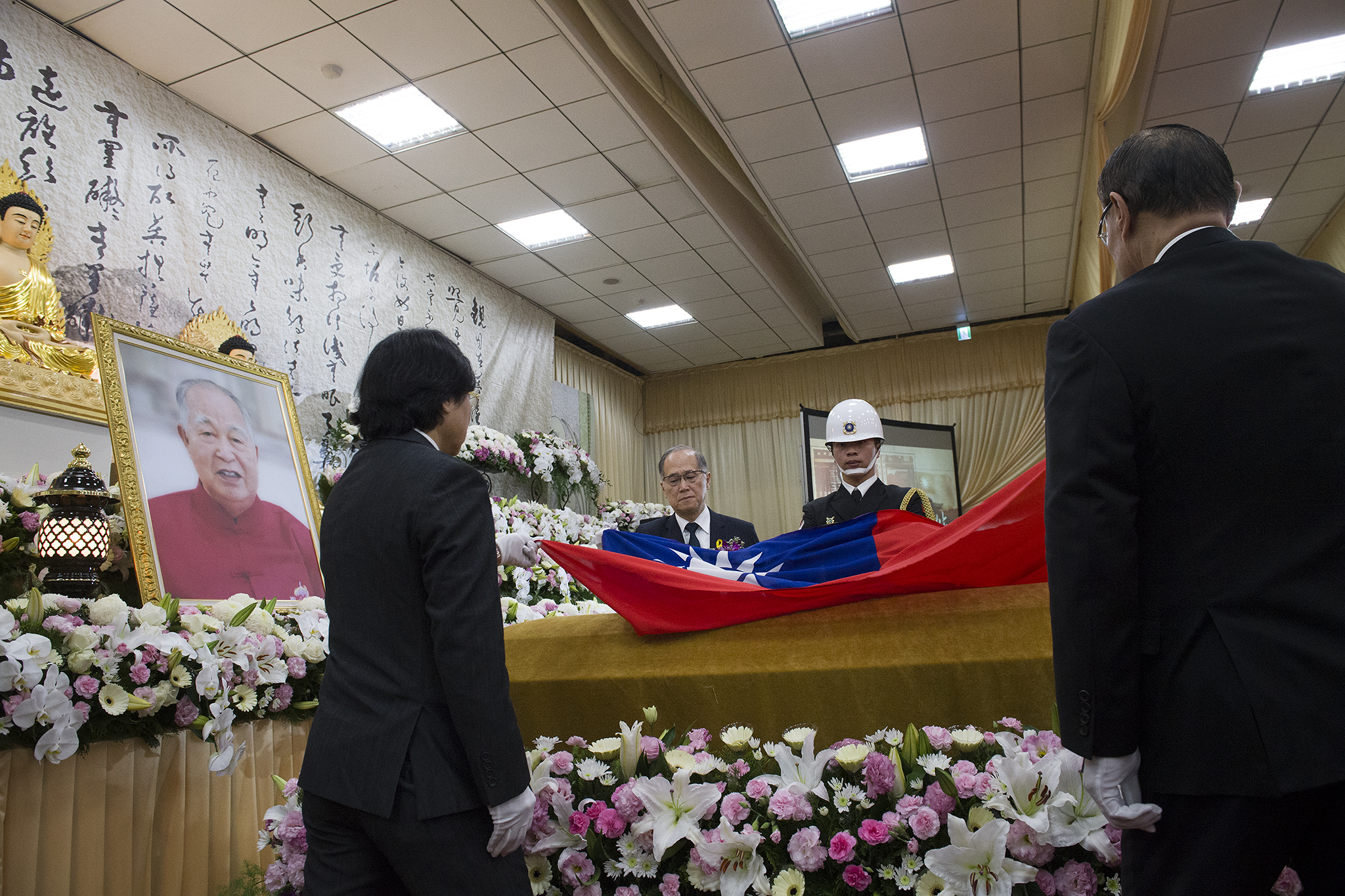
Lee's death memorial service

In his later life, Lee started to develop kidney problems which he treated with dialysis. Weeks before his death, Lee had stopped eating and depended on nutritional injection only. He told his medical team that he wished to die with dignity and rejected resuscitation. Lee died of kidney failure at 4:15 a.m. on 8 March 2017, aged 93, in his home in Miaoli County.

== Honours ==
- Guatemala:
  - Grand Cross of the Order of Antonio José de Irisarri (August 1992)
- South Africa:
  - Grand Cross of the Order of Good Hope
