= Hsiao Teng-tzang =

Taiwanese politician (1934–2017)

Hsiao Teng-tzang MLY
- 蕭天讚

Minister of Justice
- In office 24 July 1988 – 6 October 1989
- Preceded by: Shih Chi-yang
- Succeeded by: Lu Yu-wen

Minister without portfolio
- In office June 1986 – 23 July 1988

Member of the Legislative Yuan
- In office 1 February 1973 – June 1986
- Constituency: Taiwan 4th Yunlin County, Chiayi County, Tainan County, Tainan City

Personal details
- Born: 25 August 1934 Tōseki, Tōseki, Tainan Prefecture, Taiwan, Empire of Japan (today Dongshi, Chiayi, Taiwan)
- Died: 16 November 2017 (aged 83) Taipei, Taiwan
- Party: Kuomintang
- Education: National Taiwan University (LLB)

Hsiao Teng-tzang (Chinese: 蕭天讚; pinyin: Xiāo Tiānzàn; 25 August 1934 – 16 November 2017) was a Taiwanese politician. He was a member of the Legislative Yuan from 1973 to 1986 and served as Minister of Justice between July 1988 and October 1989. Hsiao later chaired the Central News Agency.

== Career ==
Hsiao was born in 1934 and studied law at National Taiwan University before becoming a teacher at Taiwan Provincial Chiayi High School. From 1963 to 1970, he served as a district court judge. He was named a high court judge later that year and served until his first election to the Legislative Yuan. Hsiao contested the next three consecutive legislative elections, resigning in 1986 before the end of his fourth term to become minister without portfolio. Concurrently with his legislative stint, Hsiao served in multiple positions within the Kuomintang. He succeeded Shih Chi-yang as justice minister in 1988. Hsiao stepped down in 1989, an exit later attributed to his actions regarding the ministry's Investigation Bureau. He was named senior adviser to President Lee Teng-hui before assuming the chairmanship of the Central News Agency, from which he stepped down in 2002. In 2009, Hsiao became an adviser to President Ma Ying-jeou. Hsiao supported Ma's unsuccessful attempt to remove Wang Jin-pyng as legislative speaker in September 2013.

Hsiao died at the age of 83 on 16 November 2017, in Taipei.
