= Shih Chi-yang =

Taiwanese lawyer and politician (1935–2019)

- 施啟揚
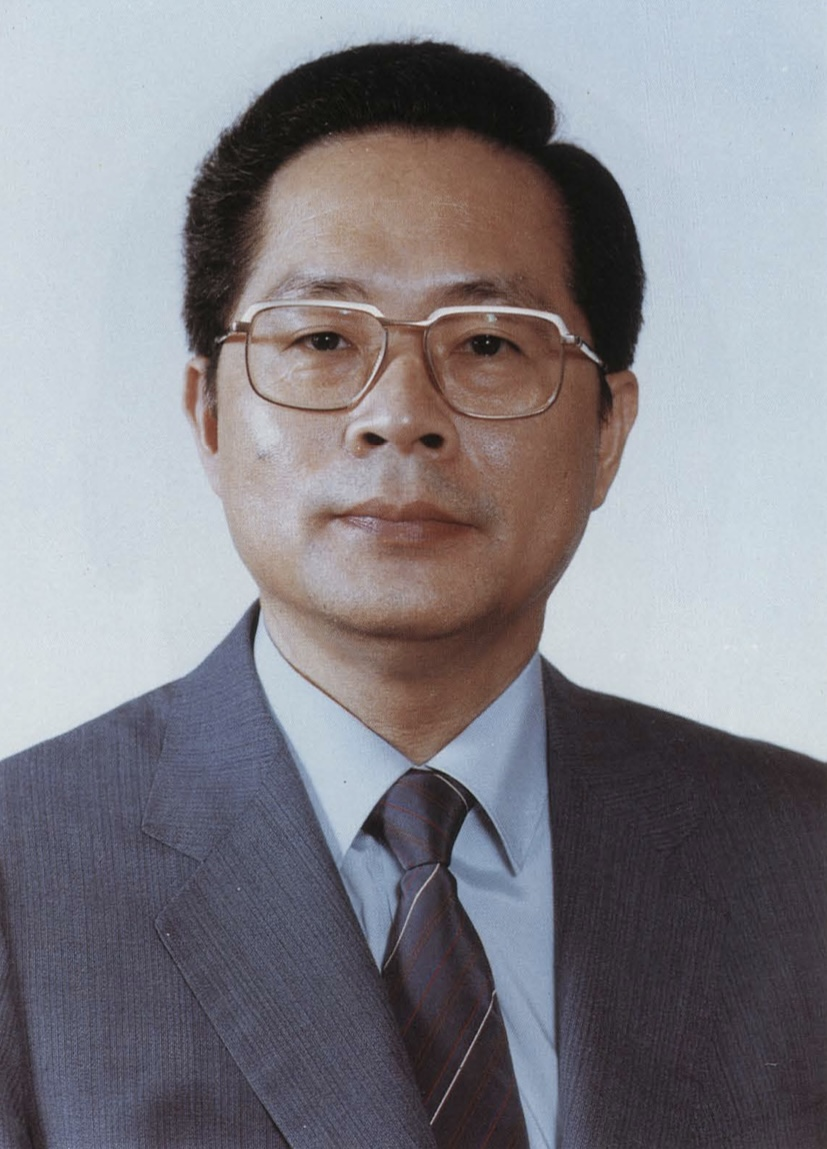

President of the Judicial Yuan
- In office 18 August 1994 – 25 January 1999
- Preceded by: Lin Yang-kang
- Succeeded by: Lu Yu-wen (acting); Weng Yueh-sheng

Minister of the Mainland Affairs Council
- In office 7 February 1991 – 31 May 1991
- Preceded by: Position established
- Succeeded by: Huang Kun-huei

Vice Premier of the Republic of China
- In office 22 July 1988 – 27 February 1993
- Premier: Yu Kuo-hwa; Lee Huan; Hau Pei-tsun
- Preceded by: Lien Chan
- Succeeded by: Hsu Li-teh

Minister of Justice
- In office 28 May 1984 – 20 July 1988
- President: Chiang Ching-kuo; Lee Teng-hui
- Preceded by: Li Yuan-tsu
- Succeeded by: Hsiao Teng-tzang

Personal details
- Born: 5 May 1935 Rokkō, Shōka, Taichū Prefecture, Taiwan, Empire of Japan (today Lukang, Changhua, Taiwan)
- Died: 5 May 2019 (aged 84) Sanxia, New Taipei, Taiwan
- Party: Kuomintang
- Spouse: Jeanne Li
- Education: National Taiwan University (LLB, LLM); Heidelberg University (LLD)

Shih Chi-yang (Chinese: 施啟揚; pinyin: Shī Qǐyáng; Wade–Giles: Shih^{1} Chʻi^{3}-yang^{2} [ʂí tɕʰì.jǎŋ]; 5 May 1935 – 5 May 2019) was a Taiwanese lawyer, legal scholar, and politician. He was Vice Premier of the Republic of China from 1988 to 1993 and convener of the Executive Yuan's Mainland Affairs Committee, which was established in 1988, and became the first Minister of the Mainland Affairs Council of the Executive Yuan when it was established in 1991. He was President of the Judicial Yuan from 1994 to 1999.

== Personal life ==
Shih graduated from National Taiwan University with a bachelor's degree and master's degree in law. He earned his doctorate in law in Germany from Heidelberg University in 1969. He was married to Jeanne Li, who led the China Youth Corps from 1987 to 2005.

Shih died at home in Sanxia District, New Taipei, of multiple organ failure on 5 May 2019.

== Awards ==
- 2013, Order of Propitious Clouds with Special Grand Cordon
