= Lu Yu-wen =

Taiwanese politician

- 呂有文

Acting President of the Judicial Yuan
- In office 25 January 1999 – 1 February 1999
- Preceded by: Shih Chi-yang
- Succeeded by: Weng Yueh-sheng

Vice President of the Judicial Yuan
- In office 1 May 1993 – 1 August 1998
- President: Lin Yang-kang; Shih Chi-yang
- Preceded by: Wang Daoyuan
- Succeeded by: Cheng Chung-mo

Minister of Justice of the Republic of China
- In office 7 October 1989 – 27 February 1993 acting until 27 November 1989
- Preceded by: Hsiao Teng-tzang
- Succeeded by: Ma Ying-jeou

Personal details
- Born: 1926 Sichuan
- Died: 29 October 1999 (aged 72–73) Taipei
- Education: Chaoyang University (LLB)

Lu Yu-wen (Chinese: 呂有文; pinyin: Lǚ Yǒuwén; [lỳ jòʊ.wə̌n]; 1926 – October 1999) was a Taiwanese politician. He served as Minister of Justice from 1989 to 1993. Lu was later named Vice President of the Judicial Yuan, serving from 1993 to 1998. He died in 1999 due to lung cancer. He is survived by a son and three daughters, all born to his first wife, who had died in 1994.
