= Morley Shih =

Taiwanese prosecutor and judge

Shih Mao-lin
- 施茂林
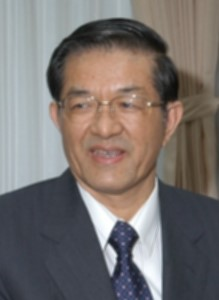

Minister of Justice of the Republic of China
- In office 1 February 2005 – 19 May 2008
- Deputy: Lee Chin-yung
- Preceded by: Chen Ding-nan
- Succeeded by: Wang Ching-feng

Personal details
- Born: 2 August 1950 (age 75) Chiayi, Taiwan
- Education: National Taiwan University (LLB)

Shih Mao-lin (Chinese: 施茂林; pinyin: Shī Màolín; born 2 August 1950), also known by his English name Morley Shih, is a Taiwanese lawyer and judge. He attended National Taiwan University and began his legal career in 1976. Shih was appointed Minister of Justice in 2005 and served until 2008.

== Early life and education ==
Shih was born in Chiayi on 2 August 1950. He attended law school at National Taiwan University, where he graduated with an LL.B. in 1972 and studied law alongside Ma Ying-jeou.

== Legal career ==
=== Prosecutor and judge ===
Shih began his legal career at the Taichung District Prosecutors' Office in 1976. In 1982, he was named a judge of the Taichung District Court. After two years on the bench, Shih was appointed chief justice of the Taichung District Court. Upon stepping down from the Taichung District Court, Shih returned to the Taichung District Prosecutors' Office, where he served as chief prosecutor. Shih received the most votes in a January 2000 poll run by the Prosecutors' Reform Association. Subsequently, Minister of Justice Chen Ding-nan named Shih chief prosecutor in Kaohsiung. The next year, Shih was tabbed to lead the Taipei District Prosecutors' Office. He remained in the position until 2004, when he was named Vice Minister of Justice under Chen in November.

=== Minister of Justice ===
It was widely speculated that Shih would be Chen's successor. Shih was then appointed in January 2005 by incoming premier Frank Hsieh, and took office on 1 February 2005 with the Hsieh cabinet. Shih retained his position after Su Tseng-chang and later Chang Chun-hsiung assumed the premiership. Throughout his tenure, Shih launched multiple investigations into electoral fraud. He also probed corruption, insider trading, and organized crime. Additionally, Shih promoted initiatives against drug offenses. Starting in 2006, Shih worked to implement a "conditional moratorium" on the death penalty, reducing executions of people on Taiwan's death row.

Shortly after leaving his position as the Ministry of Justice in May 2008, Shih petitioned for retirement as a prosecutor, which would permit him to collect a higher pension. His successor Wang Ching-feng rejected the appeal. Later that year, Shih was charged with fraud in relation to his use of special allowance funds. In 2011, charges against Shih were dropped after the use of special allowance funds was officially decriminalized.
