= Wang Ching-feng =

Taiwanese lawyer and politician

Wang Tsing-fong
- 王清峰
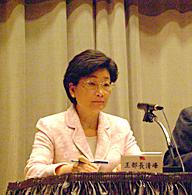
- Wang in 2009

Minister of Justice of the Republic of China
- In office 20 May 2008 – 12 March 2010
- Deputy: Wu Chen-huan
- Preceded by: Shih Mau-lin
- Succeeded by: Huang Shih-ming (acting); Tseng Yung-fu

Personal details
- Born: 1 January 1952 (age 74) Tainan City, Taiwan
- Education: National Chengchi University (LLB, LLM)

Wang Tsing-fong (Chinese: 王清峰; pinyin: Wáng Qīngfēng; Pe̍h-ōe-jī: Ông Chheng-hong; born 1 January 1952 in Tainan City) is a Taiwanese lawyer and politician.

== Education ==
Wang graduated from the Taipei First Girls' High School and received her bachelor's and master's degrees in law from National Chengchi University.

== Early career ==
Wang has been working as a lawyer since graduation. Since 1987, she has been organising activities to give legal support to help Taiwanese comfort women, child prostitutes, and rape victims.

== Political career ==
She was nominated as a member of the Control Yuan by President Lee Teng-hui, serving in this position from April 1993 to October 1995.

In October 1995, Wang resigned her Control Yuan position and accepted the invitation from Chen Li-an to be his partner in their 1996 ROC Presidential Election campaign. They finished last among the four candidates, winning 9.98% of the vote.

1996 Republic of China Presidential Election Result
President Candidate	Vice President Candidate	Party	Votes	%
Lee Teng-hui	Lien Chan	Kuomintang	5,813,699	54.0
Peng Ming-min	Frank Hsieh	Democratic Progressive Party	2,274,586	21.1
Lin Yang-kang	Hau Pei-tsun	Independent	1,603,790	14.9
Chen Li-an	Wang Ching-feng	Independent	1,074,044	9.9
Invalid/blank votes			117,160	
Total			10,883,279	100

In 2004, as an independent, Wang served as a member in the highly controversial 3-19 Shooting Investigation Committee organised by the pan-blue coalition after its loss in the 2004 ROC Presidential election. In 2005 Wang secured a seat in the National Assembly of the Republic of China after the Democratic Action Alliance led by Chang Ya-chung, her recommending party, won 1.68% vote in the 2005 Republic of China National Assembly election and thereby secured five seats. Wang resigned her seat immediately upon taking office.

== ROC Justice Ministry ==
Wang was nominated by President Ma Ying-jeou to be Minister of Justice after he won the 2008 ROC Presidential Election. On 10 March 2010, Wang announced that she is in favour of the eventual abolition of the death penalty; she emphasised that she would not allow any executions during her tenure. Her speech aroused public protests led by relatives of murder victims, such as the entertainer Pai Bing-bing (whose daughter was kidnapped and murdered in 1997). There were calls for her to step down. Wang quit her ministerial position the next day.
