= Journalist (Russian magazine) =

Journalist (Russian: Журналистъ) is a Russian magazine founded in 1914 by literary critic Vladimir Friche aimed at newsworkers. With the growing number of periodicals in pre-World War I Russia, Friche recognised the need for a publication which served the people who worked in the industry and could help to strengthen their cohesion sense of identity.

In 2004, Journalist celebrated its 90th year of operation.
