= Tseng Yung-fu =

Taiwanese politician

- 曾勇夫
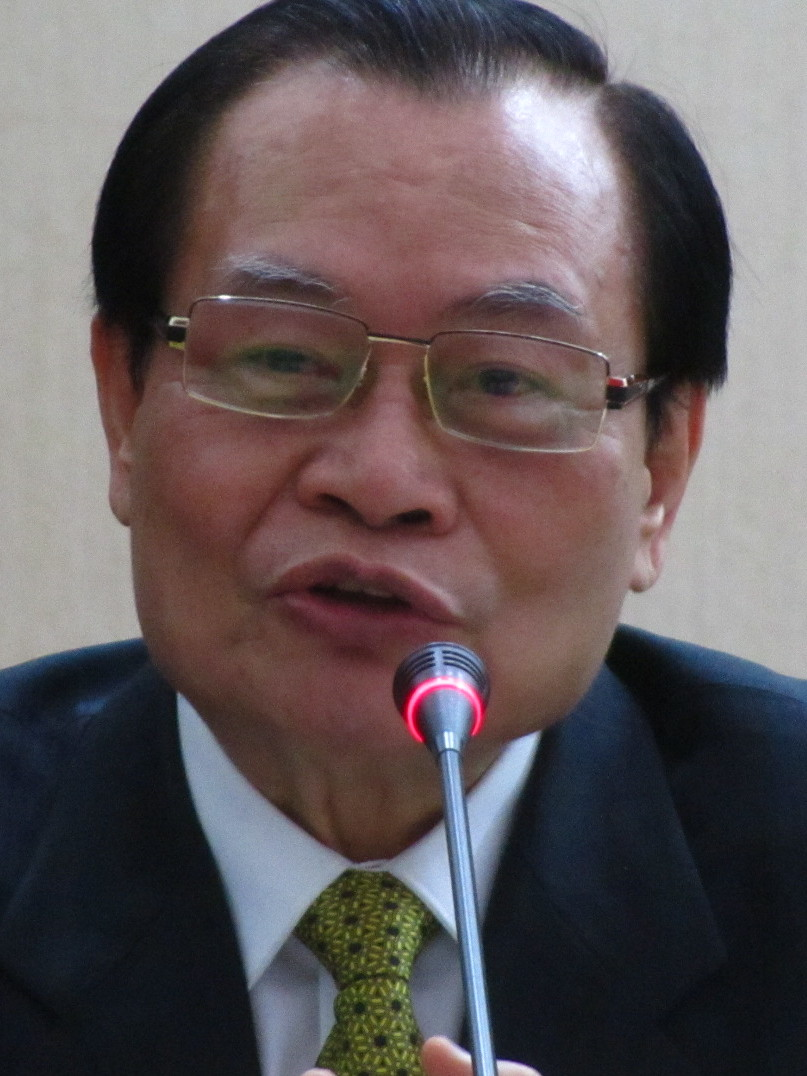

Minister of Justice of the Republic of China
- In office 22 March 2010 – 6 September 2013
- Deputy: Chen Ming-tang; Wu Chen-huan
- Preceded by: Wang Ching-feng; Huang Shih-ming (acting)
- Succeeded by: Chen Ming-tang (acting)

Political Deputy Minister of Justice of the Republic of China
- In office 1999–2000
- Minister: Yeh Chin-fong

Personal details
- Born: 12 January 1943 (age 83)
- Education: National Taiwan University (LLB)

Tseng Yung-fu (Chinese: 曾勇夫; pinyin: Zēng Yǒngfū; born 12 January 1943) is a Taiwanese politician. He was the Minister of Justice of the Executive Yuan from 22 March 2010 to 6 September 2013.

== Early career ==
Tseng had served as chief prosecutor before in Taipei, Tainan, Taitung, Yunlin, Chiayi and Kinmen.

== ROC Justice Ministry ==
On 19 March 2010, ROC Premier Wu Den-yih, after obtaining consent from ROC President Ma Ying-jeou, named Tseng to replace incumbent MOJ Minister Wang Ching-feng who had resigned days before.

=== Taiwan inmates death sentence ===
Since Tseng took the MOJ ministerial office in 2010, a total of 21 inmates have been executed. He promised that every execution shall be carried out according to the law, when his predecessor Wang Ching-feng resigned from the ministerial post due to her disagreement regarding capital punishment in Taiwan. The first execution order signed by Tseng was for four inmates on 30 April 2010.

Second execution order for five inmates was carried out on 4 March 2011, with the identified inmates are Guang Chung-yen, Wang Kuo-hua, Chung Teh-shu, Wang Chih-huang and Chuang Tien-chu.

Third execution order signed by Tseng for six inmates held on 21 December 2012, which are Zeng Si-ru, Hung Ming-tsung, Huang Hsien-cheng, Chen Chin-huo, Kuang Te-chiang and Tai Te-ying. MOJ was condemned because the ministry didn't inform the inmates' family members prior to the execution, and only did so after when they were informed to collect the dead body of their relatives. Even it was condemned by Amnesty International by saying the execution is "cold-blooded killing".

On 17 April 2013, Tseng signed the order to execute the death penalty to the six awaiting inmates, in which the capital punishment order was executed two days later. The inmates and their execution place are Lin Chin-te in Taipei Prison, Chen Jui-chin at Greater Taichung Prison, Chen Tung-jung at Greater Tainan Prison, Chang Pao-hui, Chi Chun-i and Lee Chia-hsuan at Hualien Prison. Tseng added that various public survey had shown that people support for the death penalty in Taiwan. However, the MOJ received heavy protest due to the allegation that those inmates were executed before their appeals have been heard.

=== Detention of Chen Shui-bian ===
In March 2012, Tseng granted former ROC President Chen Shui-bian a leave from Taipei Prison to undergo medical checkup at Taoyuan General Hospital in Taoyuan after meeting with legislators from Democratic Progressive Party and Taiwan Solidarity Union.

=== Taiwan HSR explosive device discovery incident ===
Commenting on the discovery of explosive device inside Taiwan High Speed Rail on 12 April 2013, speaking at Legislative Yuan in mid April 2013, Tseng said that the MOJ will draft a law about counter-terrorism within three months.

== See also ==
- Law of the Republic of China
