= The Journalist (British magazine) =

The Journalist is the magazine of the United Kingdom's National Union of Journalists (NUJ) which is published six times a year. It was started as a newspaper and was relaunched as a magazine in 1993. Since April 2008, the magazine is available online.
