= Ministry of Justice (Taiwan) =

Taiwanese ministry responsible for law

- 法務部; Fǎwùbù (Mandarin); Fap-vu Phu (Hakka)
- Emblem of the Ministry of Justice

- Seal of the Ministry of Justice (法務部印)

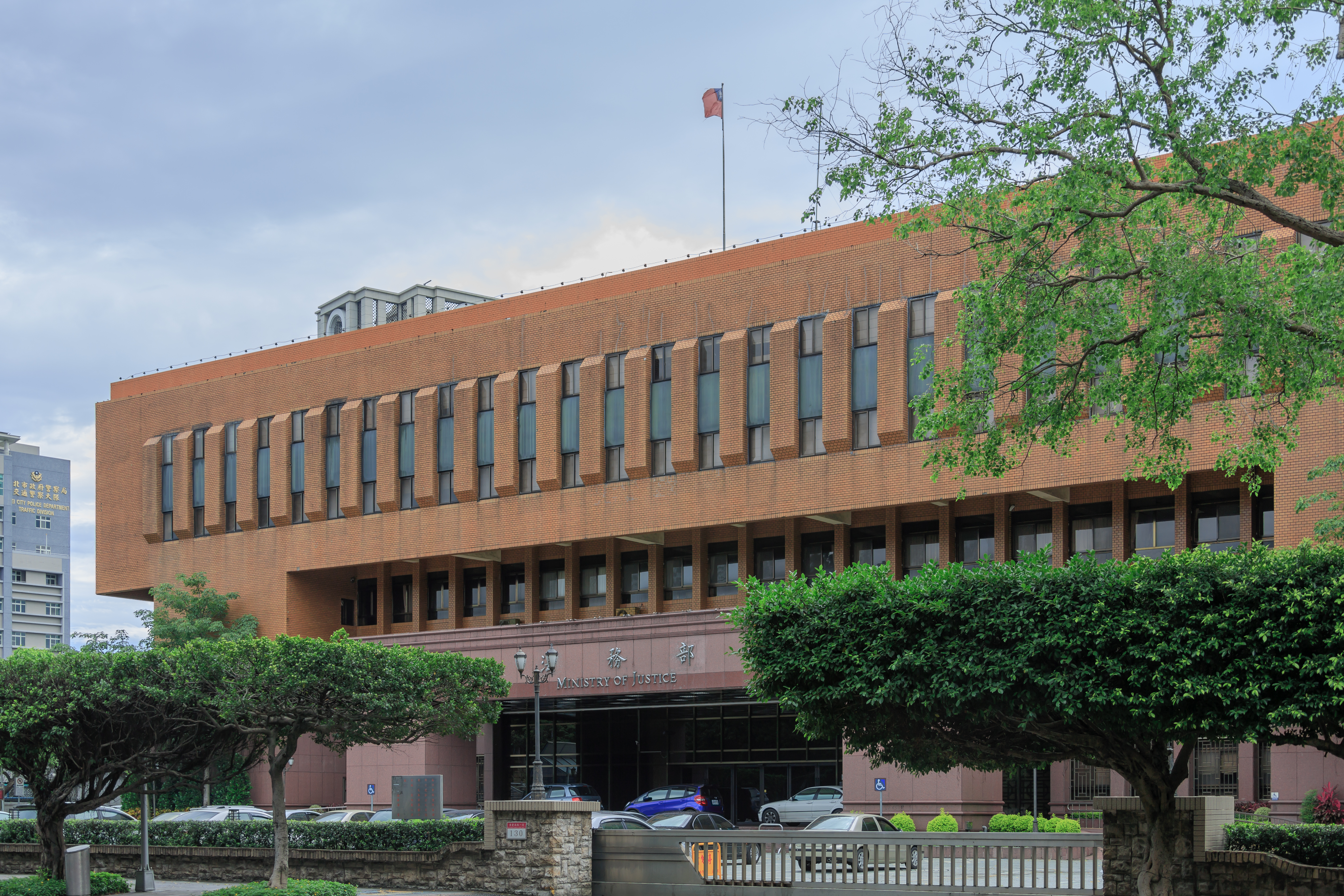
- Headquarters in Taipei

Agency overview
- Formed: 1895 (Japanese colonial era); 25 October 1945; 80 years ago (Note: Originally established on 1 January 1912 in mainland China)
- Preceding agency: Ministry of Judicial Administration
- Jurisdiction: Taiwan
- Headquarters: Zhongzheng, Taipei
- Minister responsible: Cheng Ming-chien
- Deputy Minister responsible: Huang Shih-chieh
- Agency executive: Miao Zhuoran, Director-Secretary
- Parent agency: Executive Yuan
- Child agency: Ministry of Justice Investigation Bureau
- Website: www.moj.gov.tw

The Ministry of Justice (MOJ; Chinese: 法務部; pinyin: Fǎwùbù; Pe̍h-ōe-jī: Hoat-bū-pō͘) is a ministerial level body of the government of the Republic of China (Taiwan), responsible for carrying out various regulatory and prosecutorial functions.

== History ==
=== Origins and early development (1906–1949) ===
The origins of the Ministry of Justice can be traced to the judicial reforms of the late Qing dynasty, when the imperial Ministry of Punishments (刑部) was reorganized as the Ministry of Law (法部) in 1906, with responsibility for judicial administration. Following the establishment of the Republic of China in 1912, the Ministry of Law was succeeded by the Ministry of Justice (司法部).

In 1927, the Nationalist government established a Ministry of Justice to administer judicial affairs throughout the country. The ministry was renamed the Ministry of Judicial Administration (司法行政部) in 1928 and incorporated into the newly established Judicial Yuan, one of the five branches of government under the constitutional framework advocated by Sun Yat-sen. The Judicial Yuan was formally inaugurated on 16 November 1928, with the Ministry of Judicial Administration established as one of its constituent institutions. The Organic Act governing the ministry's organization was promulgated on 19 November 1928.

The ministry was transferred from the Judicial Yuan to the Executive Yuan on 1 January 1932. It returned to the Judicial Yuan on 17 October 1934, following another reorganization of the Nationalist government's institutions. On 1 January 1943, during the Second Sino-Japanese War, the ministry was again placed under the Executive Yuan.

Following the end of Japanese rule in Taiwan in 1945, the Republic of China authorities reorganized Taiwan's existing judicial institutions, including the former colonial high court and district courts, under the Republic of China's judicial system. After the relocation of the Republic of China government to Taiwan in 1949, the Ministry of Judicial Administration continued to exercise administrative supervision over the high courts and district courts as an agency of the Executive Yuan.

=== Development in Taiwan (1950–1980) ===
Following the government's relocation to Taiwan, the Ministry of Judicial Administration organized judicial personnel training programs between 1950 and 1954 for judicial officials and candidates who had passed the relevant civil service examinations. In 1955, it established the Judges and Prosecutors Training Institute in Taipei as a specialized institution for the professional education of judicial personnel. On 1 June 1956, the Investigation Bureau, previously subordinate to the Ministry of the Interior, was transferred to the Ministry of Judicial Administration.

Under the existing judicial administration system, the ministry exercised authority over the appointment and supervision of high court and district court personnel, prompting criticism that the executive branch possessed excessive influence over the judiciary. To address the division of responsibilities between judicial administration and adjudication, the government undertook a major restructuring of the court and prosecutorial systems in 1980. On 29 June 1980, the government promulgated amendments to the ministry's organizational legislation and the Court Organization Act, establishing the legal framework for the separation of court administration from prosecutorial administration.

On 1 July 1980, the Ministry of Judicial Administration was reorganized as the Ministry of Justice (法務部), remaining subordinate to the Executive Yuan. Under the new arrangement, the administration of the high courts and lower courts was transferred to the Judicial Yuan, while the Ministry of Justice retained administrative responsibility for the prosecutorial system and correctional institutions. The reorganization also expanded the ministry's responsibilities to include judicial protection and legal affairs on behalf of the Executive Yuan. Lee Yuan-tsu, who had served as Minister of Judicial Administration, became the first Minister of Justice following the reorganization. The ministry's former Prison Department was reorganized as the Department of Corrections and Rehabilitation, responsible for correctional administration and crime prevention. On 1 August 1980, the Investigation Bureau was reorganized under the name Ministry of Justice Investigation Bureau.

=== Expansion of responsibilities (1990s–2000s) ===
The ministry's responsibilities expanded during the 1990s to include the centralized administration of government employee ethics. Following the promulgation of the Act of the Establishment of Government Employee Ethics Units and Officers on 1 July 1992, existing personnel evaluation units across government agencies were reorganized into government employee ethics units on 16 September of that year. The Ministry of Justice was designated the competent authority for government employee ethics administration nationwide, with responsibility for supervising the newly established units.

Amendments to the Administrative Enforcement Act, promulgated on 11 November 1998, provided for the transfer of the enforcement of monetary obligations under public law from the courts to specialized administrative enforcement authorities. The ministry established the Administrative Enforcement Agency on 1 January 2000 to oversee this system. On 1 January 2001, twelve regional administrative enforcement offices began operations, assuming responsibility for cases involving unpaid taxes, fines, and other monetary obligations under public law.

== Organizational structure ==
The Ministry of Justice has the following branches:

=== Departments ===
- Department of Legal System
- Department of Legal Affairs
- Department of Prosecutorial Affairs
- Department of International and Cross-Strait Legal Affairs
- Department of Prevention, Rehabilitation and Protection
- Department of Government Employee Ethics
- Department of Personnel
- Department of Accounting
- Department of Statistics
- Department of Information Management
- Secretariat

=== Affiliated agencies ===
- Supreme Prosecutors Office
  - Taiwan High Prosecutors Office
- Investigation Bureau
- Administrative Enforcement Agency
- Agency Against Corruption
- Agency of Corrections
- Academy for the Judiciary
- Institute of Forensic Medicine

== Functions ==
- Legal Affairs
- Procuratorial Administration
- Correctional Operations
- Judicial Protection
- Operations on Government Employee Ethics
- Information Management
- Investigation Work
- Cultivation of Personnel

== List of ministers ==
Political parties: Kuomintang Democratic Progressive Party Non-partisan/ unknown

No.	Name	Term of office		Days	Party	Cabinet
Minister of Judicial Administration
1	Xie Guansheng (謝冠生)	1944	December 1948		Kuomintang	Weng Wenhao; Sun Fo
2	Mei Ju-ao (梅汝璈)	did not take office				
3	Zhang Zhiben (張知本)	4 April 1949	December 1949		Kuomintang	He Yingqin; Yan Xishan
4	Lin Bin (林彬)	16 March 1950	1 June 1954	1538	Kuomintang	Chen Cheng I
5	Gu Fengxiang (谷鳳翔)	1 June 1954	1 June 1960	2192	Kuomintang	Yu Hung-chun; Chen Cheng II
6	Zheng Yanfen (鄭彥棻)	1 June 1960	6 December 1967	2744	Kuomintang	Chen Cheng II; Yen Chia-kan
7	Zha Liangjian (查良鑑)	6 December 1967	10 July 1970	947	Kuomintang	Yen Chia-kan
8	Wang Renyuan (王任遠)	10 July 1970	11 June 1976	2163	Kuomintang	Yen Chia-kan; Chiang Ching-kuo
9	Wang Daoyuan (汪道淵)	11 June 1976	30 May 1978	718	Kuomintang	Chiang Ching-kuo
Minister of Justice (since 1 July 1980)
10	Lee Yuan-tsu (李元簇)	30 May 1978	1 June 1984	2194	Kuomintang	Sun Yun-suan
11	Shih Chi-yang (施啟揚)	1 June 1984	23 July 1988	1513	Kuomintang	Yu Kuo-hua
12	Hsiao Teng-tzang (蕭天讚)	23 July 1988	7 October 1989	441	Kuomintang	Yu Kuo-hua; Lee Huan
—	Lu Yu-wen (呂有文)	7 October 1989	27 November 1989	51	Kuomintang	Lee Huan
13	Lu Yu-wen (呂有文)	27 November 1989	27 February 1993	1188	Kuomintang	Lee Huan; Hau Pei-tsun
14	Ma Ying-jeou (馬英九)	27 February 1993	10 June 1996	1199	Kuomintang	Lien Chan
15	Liao Cheng-hao (廖正豪)	10 June 1996	14 July 1998	764	Kuomintang	Lien Chan; Vincent Siew
16	Cheng Chung-mo (城仲模)	14 July 1998	1 February 1999	202	Kuomintang	Vincent Siew
17	Yeh Chin-fong (葉金鳳) (Note: First female Minister of Justice.)	1 February 1999	20 May 2000	474	Kuomintang	Vincent Siew
18	Chen Ding-nan (陳定南)	20 May 2000	1 February 2005	1718	Democratic Progressive Party	Tang Fei; Chang Chun-hsiung I Yu Shyi-kun
19	Shih Mau-lin (施茂林)	1 February 2005	20 May 2008	1204	Independent	Frank Hsieh; Su Tseng-chang I Chang Chun-hsiung II
20	Wang Ching-feng (王清峰)	20 May 2008	12 March 2010	661	Independent	Liu Chao-shiuan; Wu Den-yih
—	Huang Shih-ming (黃世銘)	12 March 2010	22 March 2010	10		Wu Den-yih
21	Tseng Yung-fu (曾勇夫)	22 March 2010	6 September 2013	1264		Wu Den-yih; Sean Chen; Jiang Yi-huah
—	Chen Ming-tang (陳明堂)	6 September 2013	30 September 2013	24		Jiang Yi-huah
22	Luo Ying-shay (羅瑩雪)	30 September 2013	20 May 2016	963	Kuomintang	Jiang Yi-huah; Mao Chi-kuo; Chang San-cheng
23	Chiu Tai-san (邱太三)	20 May 2016	16 July 2018	787	Democratic Progressive Party	Lin Chuan; William Lai
24	Tsai Ching-hsiang (蔡清祥)	16 July 2018	20 May 2024	2135		William Lai; Su Tseng-chang II; Chen Chien-jen
25	Cheng Ming-chien (鄭銘謙)	20 May 2024	Incumbent	882		Cho Jung-tai

== Access ==
The MOJ building is within walking distance just north of the Xiaonanmen Station of the Taipei Metro on the Green Line.

== See also ==
- Justice ministry
- Constitution of the Republic of China
- Six Codes
- Law of Taiwan
- Law schools in Taiwan
- Judicial Yuan
- Politics of the Republic of China
- Supreme Court of the Republic of China
- Supreme Prosecutors Office
- Taiwan High Prosecutors Office
- District Courts (Taiwan)
