= Politics of Taiwan =

- Emblem
- Polity type: Unitary parliamentary constitutional republic under a semi-presidential system
- Constitution: Constitution of the Republic of China; Additional Articles of the Constitution of the Republic of China
- Formation: 28 May 1948; 78 years ago

Legislative branch
- Name: Legislative Yuan
- Type: Unicameral
- Presiding officer: Han Kuo-yu, President of the Legislative Yuan

Executive branch
- Head of state
- Title: President
- Currently: Lai Ching-te
- Appointer: Direct popular vote
- Head of government
- Title: Premier
- Currently: Cho Jung-tai
- Appointer: President
- Cabinet
- Name: Executive Yuan
- Current cabinet: Cho cabinet
- Leader: Premier
- Deputy leader: Vice Premier
- Ministries: 12

Judicial branch
- Judicial Yuan
- Chief judge: Shieh Ming-yan (acting)
- Seat: Judicial Building
- Supreme Court
- Chief judge: Kao Meng-hsun
- Seat: Zhongzheng, Taipei

Civil service branch
- Name: Examination Yuan
- President: Chou Hung-hsien
- Vice President: Hsu Shu-hsiang
- Members: 9

Auditory branch
- Name: Control Yuan
- President: Chen Chu
- Vice President: Lee Hung-chun
- Members: 29

Taiwan, officially the Republic of China (ROC), is governed in a framework of a representative democratic republic under a five-power system. The president is the head of state, with the premier as the head of government, currently ruled by the Democratic Progressive Party (DPP) since 2016. Taiwan's 6 major cities, Kaohsiung, New Taipei, Taichung, Tainan, Taipei, and Taoyuan, are special municipalities. The rest of the country is divided into 3 cities and 13 counties.

The Republic of China was established in 1912 in Nanjing. In 1949, the government relocated to Taiwan because of its military losses in the Chinese Civil War, and was internationally recognized as the official government of China until 1971 by the United Nations and until 1979 by the United States. Prior to the constitutional reforms in 1991, the political system of Taiwan took place in a framework of a parliamentary representative democratic republic, where the President served a primarily ceremonial role as head of state. Legislative power is formally vested in both the government and its tricameral parliament: the National Assembly which elects the President and Vice President as well as makes major constitutional amendments, the Control Yuan and the Legislative Yuan.

Until the end of the martial law period in 1987, the Taiwanese political system under the KMT Dang Guo regime and White Terror was authoritarian, whereby political opposition was harshly suppressed, all religious activity controlled by the KMT, dissent not permitted, and civil rights curtailed. After democratization in the 1990s, new political parties became legal, and restrictions on free speech and civil rights were lifted. The Economist Intelligence Unit rated Taiwan 8th place as a "full democracy" in 2022. According to the V-Dem Democracy indices, in 2026, Taiwan was the third most electorally and liberally democratic country in Asia.

== Constitution ==
Taiwan is governed under the Constitution of the Republic of China, which was drafted in 1947 before the fall of the mainland China to the Chinese Communist Party (CCP) and the full retreat of the ROC government to Taiwan. The Constitution outlined a government intended for Greater China, with territorial considerations encompassing mainland China, Mongolia, Taiwan, and other Qing-ruled areas. Significant amendments were made to the Constitution in 1991, and there have been a number of judicial interpretations made to take into account the fact that the Constitution covers a much smaller area than originally envisioned.

As the Kuomintang (KMT) government continued to insist that it was the only legitimate government of Greater China, when the KMT retreated to Taipei in 1949, it re-established the full array of central political bodies which existed in mainland China in the de jure capital of Nanjing (Nanking). While much of this structure remains in place, in 1991 President Lee Teng-hui unofficially abandoned the government's claim of sovereignty over mainland China by stating that Taiwan does not "dispute the fact that the Communists control mainland China." However, the National Assembly has not officially altered the nominal national borders, since to do so might be viewed as a prelude to formal Taiwanese independence. The People's Republic of China has several times threatened to start a war if the government of Taiwan formalizes independence, as codified in its Anti-Secession Law. Neither the National Assembly nor the Supreme Court has defined the term "existing national boundaries," as stated in the constitution. The latter refused to do so, noting it was a "significant political question."

Amending the ROC constitution now requires the approval of three-fourths of the quorum of members of the Legislative Yuan. This quorum requires at least three-fourths of all members of the Legislature. After passing by the legislature, the amendment needs ratification in a referendum from at least fifty percent of all eligible voters of the ROC regardless of voter turnout.

== Administrative divisions ==
Since the de facto end of the Chinese Civil War and the retreat of the government of the Republic of China to Taiwan, the modern-day ROC, or the "free area", has consisted of Taiwan Island, Penghu, Kinmen, Matsu and several smaller islands, including Taiping Island in the South China Sea. The whole country is divided into two streamlined provinces (Taiwan and Fukien) and six special municipalities. Since the provinces are streamlined and the de facto dissolution of the provincial governments, the cities and counties are directly governed by the central government, namely Executive Yuan. The central governed administrative divisions are listed below.

- Six special municipalities: Kaohsiung, New Taipei, Taichung, Tainan, Taipei, and Taoyuan.
- Two non-functioning provinces: Fukien and Taiwan
  - Three provincial cities: Chiayi, Keelung, Hsinchu.
  - Thirteen counties: Changhua, Chiayi, Hsinchu, Hualien, Kinmen, Lienchiang, Miaoli, Nantou, Penghu, Pingtung, Taitung, Yilan and Yunlin.

== Government ==
Under the current constitutional amendments, the government is run under a de facto semi-presidential system, consisting of the presidency and five branches (Yuan; 院, literally "Government Agency"): the Executive Yuan, Legislative Yuan, Judicial Yuan, Examination Yuan, and Control Yuan, modeled on Sun Yat-sen's political philosophy of Three Principles of the People.

The president may appoint the premier, the head of government, without the consent of the legislature, but they share limitations found in other semi-presidential systems, including the lack of a strong veto and no direct control of most administrative policy. Executive power is exercised by the Executive Yuan. Legislative power is vested primarily in the Legislative Yuan. Taiwan's judiciary is independent of the executive and the legislature. In addition, the Examination Yuan is in charge of validating the qualification of civil servants, and the Control Yuan inspects, reviews, and audits the policies and operations of the government. Since the 2005 amendments of the Additional Articles of the Constitution, the Legislative Yuan has been the de facto unicameral parliamentary body of the country.

=== Presidency ===
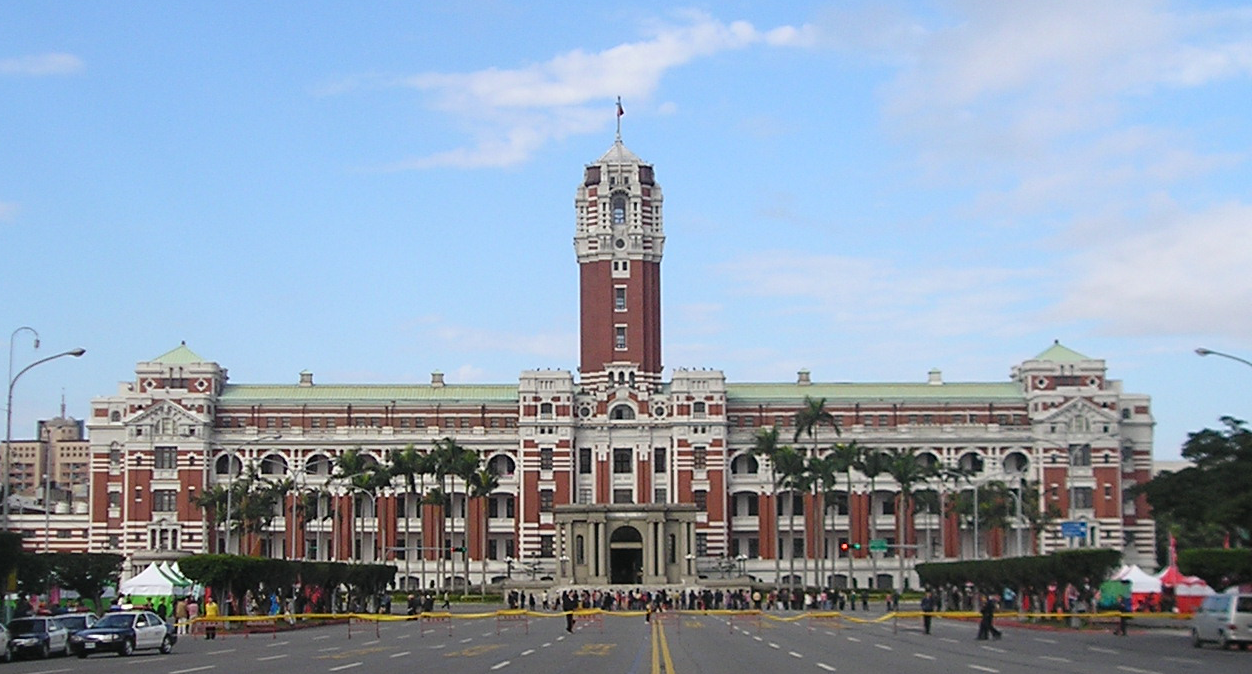
Presidential Office Building

The President is the head of state of the Republic of China and commander-in-chief of the armed forces. Based on the Constitution of the Republic of China, the head of state is the president, who is elected by popular vote for a four-year term on the same ticket as the vice-president. The leadership of the country consists of the two top officials that is directly and jointly elected by citizens of the Republic of China residing in the Taiwan Area.

The president has authority over the five administrative branches (Yuan): Executive, Legislative, Control, Judicial, and Examination. The president appoints the members of the Executive Yuan as the cabinet, including a premier, who is officially the president of the Executive Yuan; members are responsible for policy and administration. Under the president, two advisory and administrative agencies are established to support the work of the president.

=== Executive Yuan ===
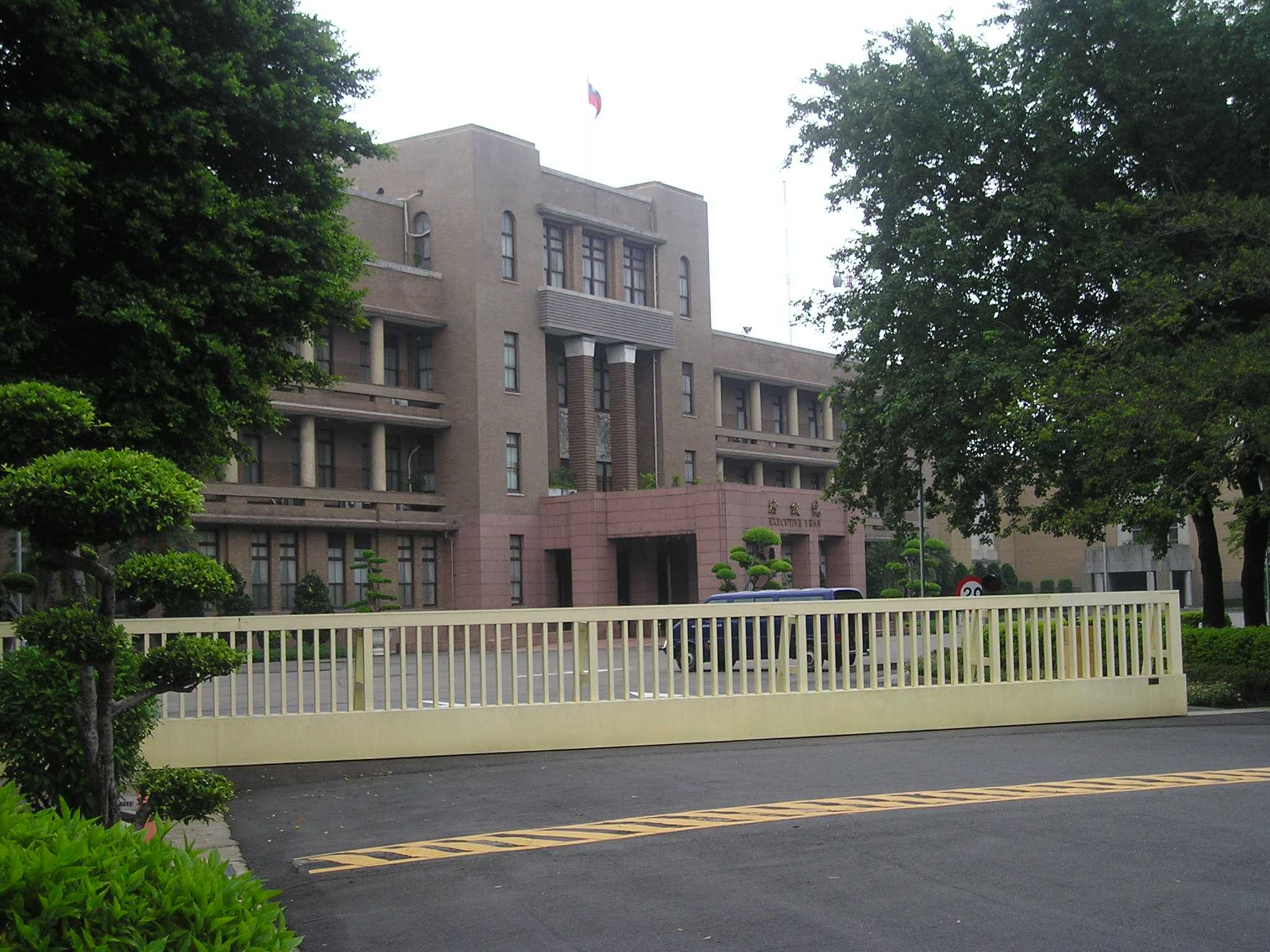
Executive Yuan Building

The Executive Yuan comprises the premier, vice-premier, and the cabinet members who are responsible for policy and administration. However, the ROC's political system does not fit traditional models. The premier is selected by the president without the need for approval from the Legislature, but the Legislature can pass laws without regard for the president, as neither the president nor the premier wields veto power. Thus, there is little incentive for the president and the legislature to negotiate on legislation if they are of opposing parties. During the tenure of the pan-Green's Chen Shui-bian the continued control of the Legislative Yuan by the pan-Blue majority caused legislation to repeatedly stall, as the two sides were deadlocked.

There is another curiosity of the ROC system; because the ROC was previously dominated by strongman one-party politics, real power in the system shifted from one position to another, depending on what position was currently occupied by the leader of the state (Chiang Kai-shek and later his son, Chiang Ching-kuo). This legacy has resulted in executive powers currently being concentrated in the office of the president rather than the premier.

=== Legislative Yuan ===
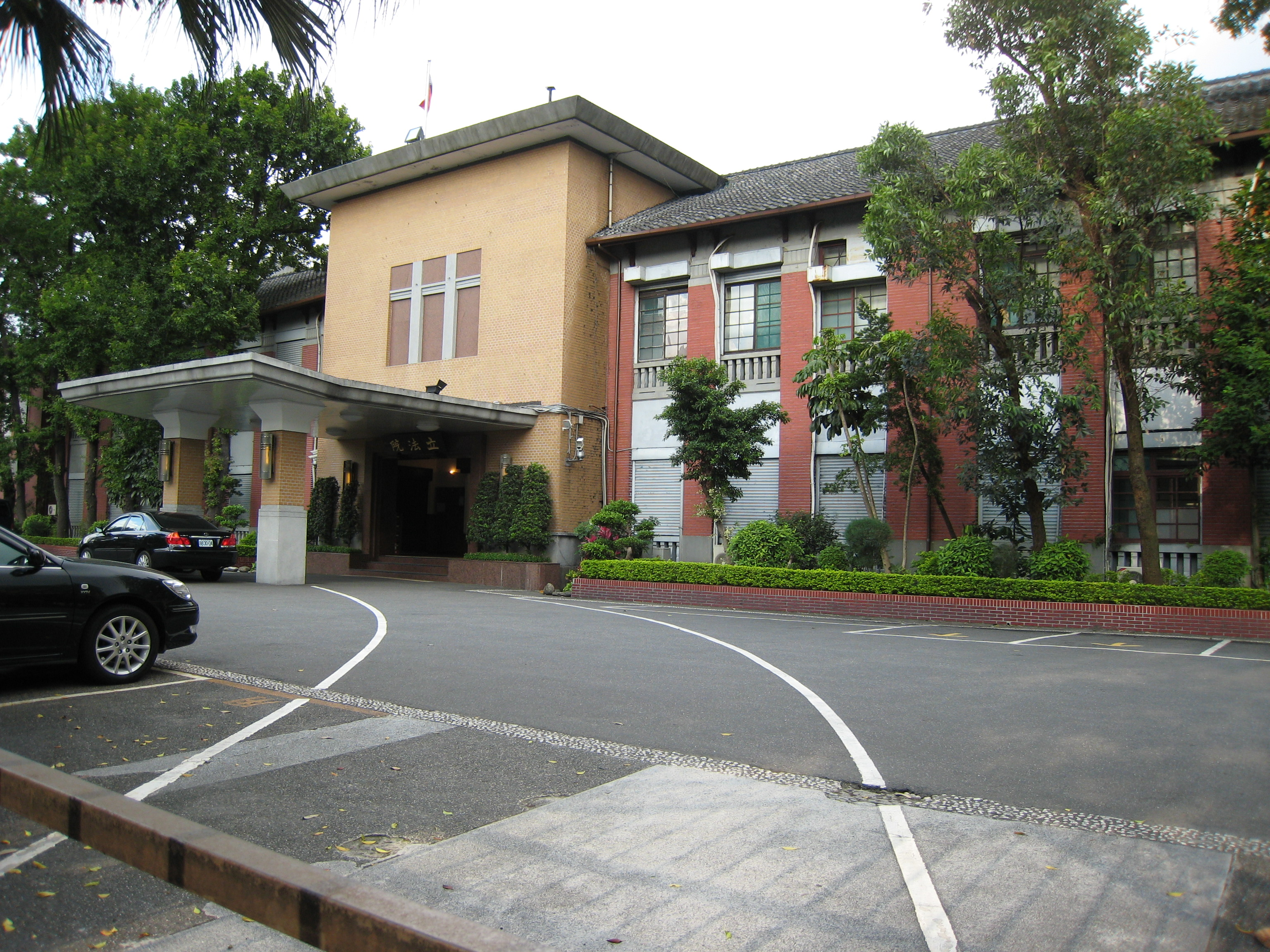
Legislative Yuan Building

The main legislative body is the unicameral Legislative Yuan with one hundred and thirteen seats. Seventy-three are elected in single member districts; thirty-four are elected based on the proportion of nationwide votes received by participating political parties, and six seats are reserved to represent aboriginal groups. Members serve four-year terms. Although sometimes referred to as a "parliament", the Legislative Yuan, under Sun's political theory, is a branch of government, while only the National Assembly of the Republic of China, which is now abolished, with the power to amend the constitution and formerly to elect the president and vice president, could be considered a parliament. However, after constitutional amendments effectively transferring almost all of the National Assembly's powers to the Legislative Yuan in the late 1990s, it has become more common for newspapers in Taiwan to refer to the Legislative Yuan as the nation's "parliament" (國會, guóhuì).

The first LY had 773 seats and was viewed as a "rubber stamp" institution. Like the National Assembly, representatives elected in 1947–48 held these seats "indefinitely" until the 1991 ruling. The second LY was elected in 1992. The third LY, elected in 1995, had 157 members serving 3-year terms. The fourth LY, elected in 1998, was expanded to 225 members. The LY has greatly enhanced its standing in relation to the Executive Yuan and has established itself as an important player on the central level. Along with increasing strength and size this body is beginning to reflect the recently liberalized political system.

In the 1992 and 1995 elections, the main opposition party, the Democratic Progressive Party (DPP), challenged the KMT dominance of the Legislature. In both elections the DPP won a significant share of the LY seats, and the KMT held only half the seats in the LY. In 1998, however, the KMT increased its LY majority from 50% to 55% and continued to play a dominant role in the legislature as the leading opposition party. In the 2001 election, the DPP became the largest party after large losses suffered by the KMT. Control of the Yuan swung back to the KMT after the 2008 elections, while in 2016 the DPP regained the status as the largest party and achieved a majority for the first time in history.

=== Judicial Yuan ===
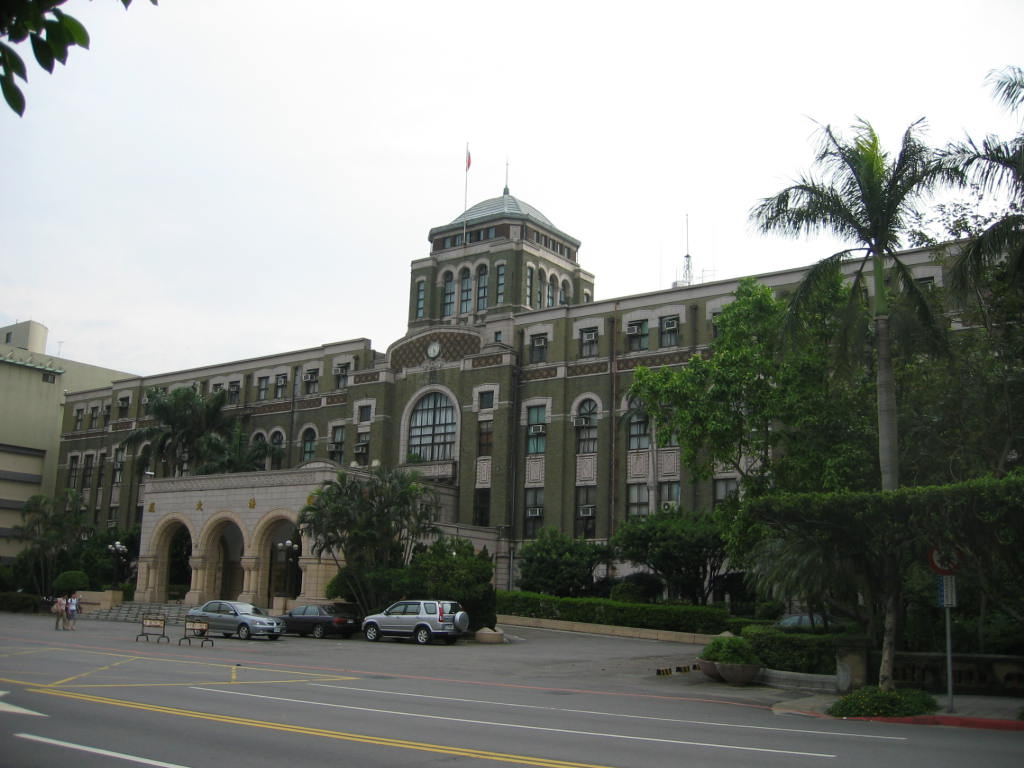
Judicial Yuan Building

The Judicial Yuan is the ROC's highest judiciary. The President and vice-president of the Judicial Yuan and fifteen Justices form the Council of Grand Justices. Grand Justices are appointed by the President, with the consent of the Legislative Yuan, to eight-year terms. The highest court, the Supreme Court, consists of a number of civil and criminal divisions, each of which is formed by a presiding Judge and four Associate Judges, all appointed for life.

In 1993, a separate constitutional court was established to resolve constitutional disputes, regulate the activities of political parties and accelerate the democratization process. There is no trial by jury but the right to a fair and public trial is protected by law and respected in practice; many cases are presided over by multiple judges. Capital punishment is legal. Efforts have been made by the government to reduce the number of executions, although they have not been able to completely abolish the punishment. As of 2006, about 80% of Taiwanese want to keep the death penalty.

=== Examination Yuan ===
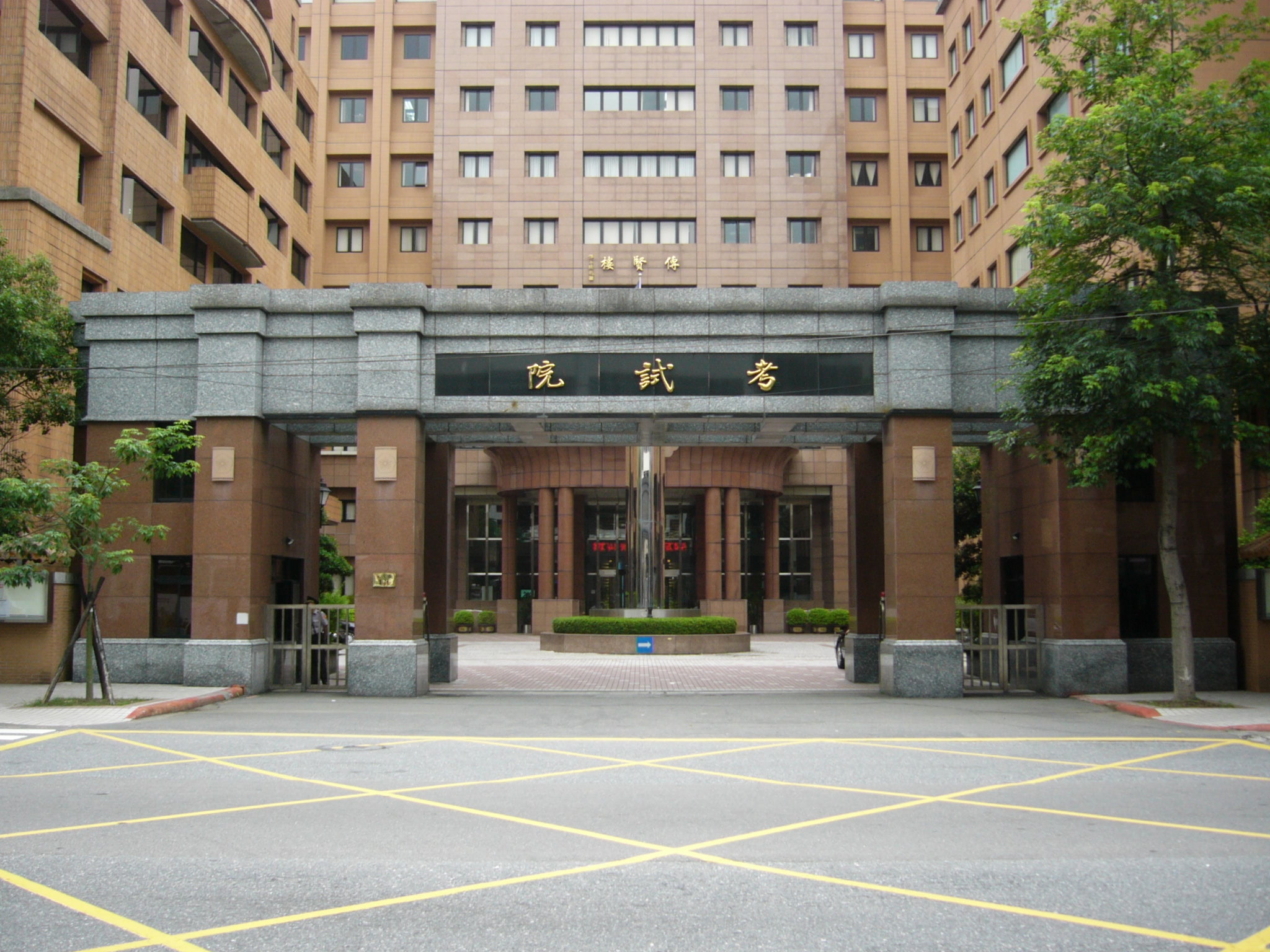
Examination Yuan Building

The Examination Yuan (ExY) functions as a civil service commission and includes two ministries: the Ministry of Examination, which recruits officials through competitive examination, and the Ministry of Personnel, which manages the civil service. The concept of the Examination Yuan is based on the old Imperial examination system used in Imperial China. As a special branch of government under the Three Principles of the People. The President appoints the Examination Yuan's President. The current President of the Examination Yuan is Chou Hung-hsien.

=== Control Yuan ===
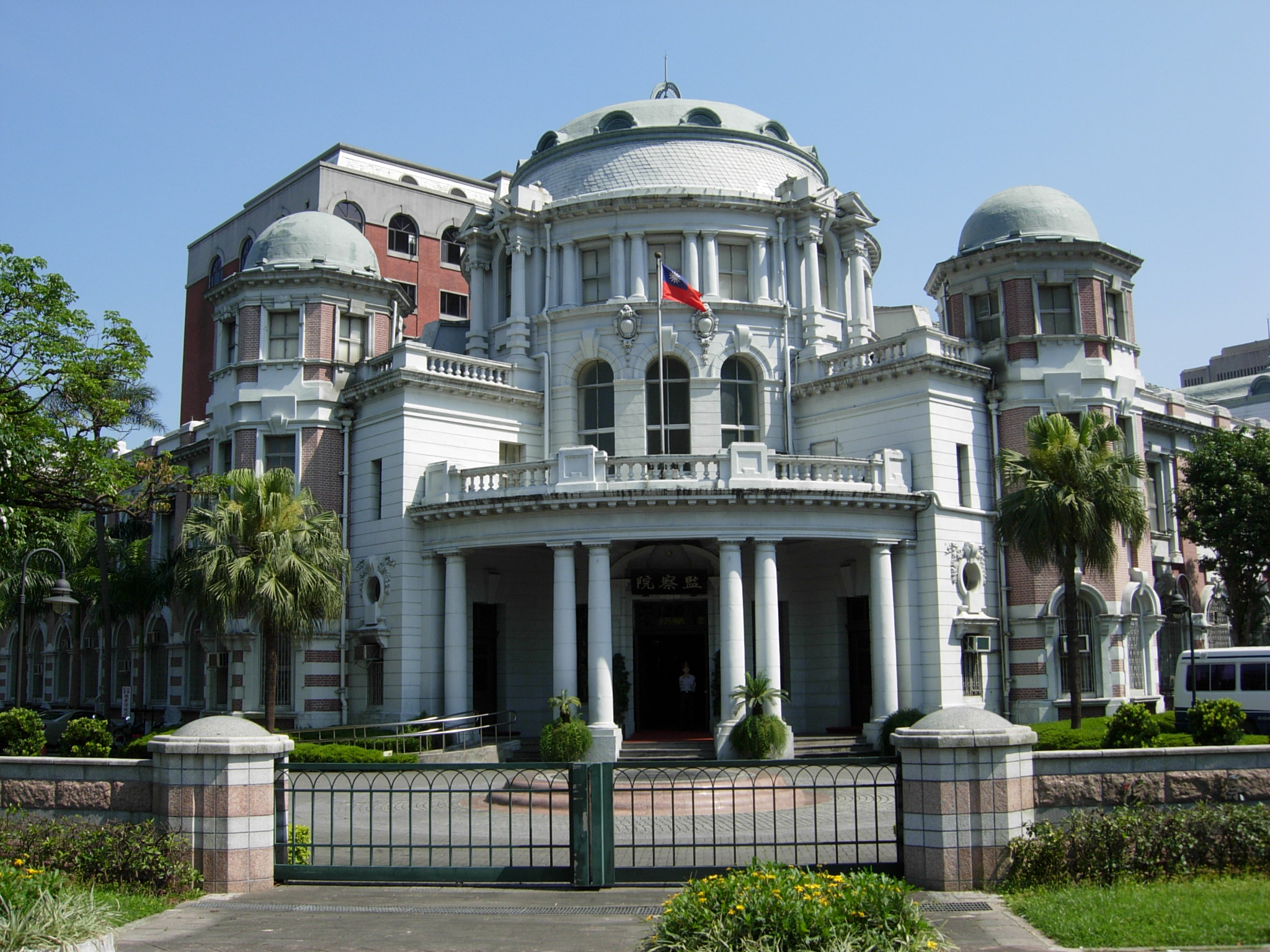
Control Yuan Building

Based on the traditional Chinese censorate, the Control Yuan is an investigatory agency that monitors the other branches of government. It may be compared to the Court of Auditors of the European Union, the Government Accountability Office of the United States, a political ombudsman, or a standing commission for administrative inquiry. Before the 1990s, it was the upper chamber of the tricameral parliament.

The Control Yuan (CY) was elected in 1947 by provincial legislatures. The current form since 1993 monitors the efficiency of public service and investigates instances of corruption. The 29 Control Yuan members are appointed by the president and approved by the Legislative Yuan; they serve 6-year terms. In recent years, the Control Yuan has become more active, and it has conducted several major investigations and impeachments. The current president of the Control Yuan is Chen Chu.

== Elections ==
2024 presidential election results:

Candidate	Running mate	Party	Votes	%
Lai Ching-te	Hsiao Bi-khim	Democratic Progressive Party	5,586,019	40.05
Hou Yu-ih	Jaw Shaw-kong	Kuomintang	4,671,021	33.49
Ko Wen-je	Cynthia Wu	Taiwan People's Party	3,690,466	26.46
Total			13,947,506	100.00
Valid votes			13,947,506	99.28
Invalid/blank votes			100,804	0.72
Total votes			14,048,310	100.00
Registered voters/turnout			19,548,531	71.86
Source: Central Election Commission

2024 legislative election results:

Party	Votes	%	Total seats	+/–
Kuomintang	4,764,293	34.58	52	+14
Democratic Progressive Party	4,981,060	36.16	51	-10
Taiwan People's Party	3,040,334	22.07	8	+3
New Power Party	353,670	2.57	0	-3
Taiwan Obasang Political Equality Party	128,613	0.93	0	0
Green Party Taiwan	117,298	0.85	0	0
Taiwan Statebuilding Party	95,078	0.69	0	0
People First Party	69,817	0.51	0	0
MiLinguall Party	44,852	0.33	0	0
Taiwan Solidarity Union	43,372	0.31	0	0
New Party	40,429	0.29	0	0
Judicial Reform Party	37,755	0.27	0	0
Institutional Island of Saving the World	19,691	0.14	0	0
Unionist Party	18,425	0.13	0	0
The People Union Party	11,746	0.09	0	0
Taiwan Renewal Party	10,303	0.07	0	0
Independents			2	0
Vacant			–	–
Total	13,776,736	100.00	113	–
Source: Central Election Commission

== Political parties ==
As of October 2026, there are 397 officially registered parties in Taiwan, and 79 active parties. The complex structure of the party system in Taiwan was also influenced by the voting system which uses single non-transferable vote for legislative elections and first past the post for executive elections. Starting with the 2008 legislative elections, the SNTV system was discarded in favor of a mixed single member district (SMD) with proportional representation based on national party votes, similar to Japan.

The aftermath of the 2000 Presidential election and the 2001 legislative election left the Taiwanese fragmented among several political parties. These parties can be divided into "blue" factions (Pan-Blue Coalition) and "green" factions (Pan-Green Coalition), with the "blue" faction tending toward unification and a national identity that is linked with China and the "green" faction leaning toward a national identity based on Taiwan independence which is separate from the Chinese national identity. The "blue" faction comes from the color of the KMT and includes the KMT, the People First Party, and the New Party. The "green" faction comes from the color of the Democratic Progressive Party and includes the Democratic Progressive Party, Social Democratic Party, and the Taiwan Statebuilding Party.

The party system is currently dominated by two major parties: the Kuomintang (KMT), which broadly favors maintaining the constitutional framework of the Republic of China Constitution and economic cooperation with mainland China, and the Democratic Progressive Party (DPP), which broadly favors de jure Taiwanese independence, and the eventual abolition of the ROC Constitution in favor of creating a "Taiwanese Republic."

Democratic Progressive Party (DPP)

After 1986, the KMT's hold on power was challenged by the emergence of competing political parties. Before 1986, candidates opposing the KMT ran in elections as independents or "nonpartisans." Before the 1986 island-wide elections many "nonpartisans" grouped together to create Taiwan's first opposition party, the Democratic Progressive Party (DPP). Despite the official ban on forming new political parties, the government authorities did not prohibit the DPP from operating, and in the 1986 elections DPP and independent candidates captured more than 20% of the vote. The Civic Organizations Law passed in 1989 allowed for the formation of new political parties, thereby legalizing the DPP, and its support and influence increased.

In the 1992 Legislative Yuan elections, the DPP won 51 seats in the 161-seat body. While this was only half the number of KMT seats, it made the DPP's voice an important factor in legislative decisions. Winning the Taipei mayor's position in December 1994, significantly enhanced the DPP's image. The DPP continued its strong showing in the 1995 LY race, winning 45 of the 157 seats to the KMT's 81. The DPP for the first time succeeded in outpolling the KMT in the November 1997 local elections, gaining 12 of the 23 magistrate and mayoral seats as opposed to the KMT's 8 and winning 43% of the vote versus the KMT's 41%.

The DPP membership is made up largely of the Hoklo people, the largest ethnic group in Taiwan. The DPP maintains that Taiwan is an entity separate from mainland China and supports an independent "Republic of Taiwan" as part of its platform. The recent downplaying of Taiwan independence by the DPP as a party, however, led to the formation by hard-line advocates of a new political party called the Taiwan Independence Party in December 1996.

Kuomintang (KMT)

Until 1986, Taiwan's political system was effectively controlled by one party, the KMT, the leader of which also was the President. Many top political officials were members of the party. The party claimed over 2 million members, and its net assets were reputed to total more than NT $61.2 billion, making it the richest political party in the world.

Taiwan People's Party (TPP)

The Taiwan People's Party was formed on August 6, 2019 by Ko Wen-je, who served as its first chairman. It is a center-left party that considers itself as an alternative to both the DPP and the KMT.

New Power Party (NPP)

The New Power Party was formed in early 2015. The party emerged from the Sunflower Student Movement in 2014, and advocates for universal human rights, civil and political liberties, as well as Taiwan independence/nationalism. The NPP currently had 3 members in the LY.

Social Democratic Party (SDP)

The Social Democratic Party was formed in early 2015. The party emerged from the Sunflower Student Movement in 2014, and advocates for a social-democratic and progressive party, calling for a reduction in income inequality, the protection of labour rights, the abolition of the death penalty and the legalisation of same-sex marriage. The SDP currently had 1 members in the Taipei City Council.

Taiwan Statebuilding Party (TSP)

The Taiwan Statebuilding Party which advocates de jure Taiwan independence and the party is considered a close ally of the Democratic Progressive Party. The TSP was formed primarily because the DPP had to moderate its stance with regard to Taiwan independence, leaving a hole in the Taiwanese political spectrum. The party first came to national attention when Chen Po-wei won Taichung District 2 to secure the party's first Legislative Yuan seat.

People First Party (PFP)

A new opposition party was formed in the wake of the March 2000 presidential election by the runner up, a KMT maverick candidate. The People's First Party is composed primarily of former KMT and NP members who supported former KMT Taiwan Provincial Governor James Soong's presidential bid. The PFP currently had 17 members in the LY before the 2001 election, but increased its representation to over 40 in that election.

New Party (NP)

The New Party was formed in August 1993 by a group made up largely of second-generation mainlander KMT members who were unhappy both with corruption in the KMT and with what they saw as the "Taiwanization" of KMT ideology and leadership. The NP emphasizes "clean government" and the original KMT focus on unification with mainland China. NP influence remains modest and seems on the wane; it won 21 of the 164 LY seats in the 1995 elections but only 11 of 225 seats in 1998. The New Party was almost annihilated in the 2001 election as its members defected to the Peoples First Party.

Taiwan Solidarity Union (TSU)

In 2001, supporters of former President Lee founded the Taiwan Solidarity Union (TSU). Even though Lee did not join this party, he is named its spiritual leader and most believe he endorsed it. The TSU was formed primarily because the DPP, as it took power, had to moderate its standing as regards Taiwan independence, leaving a hole in the Taiwanese political spectrum. In a bid to help the "green" side achieve control in the Legislative Yuan, the TSU was formed to attract the radical votes left over from DPP and the localist support for KMT. The TSU had often expressed that it wanted to be the "decisive minority".

Other parties than the parties listed above include:

- Taiwan Number One Party
- New Nation Association
- Democratic Alliance
- Natural Law Party
- Taiwan Independence Party
- Green Party Taiwan
- Non-Party Alliance
- Farmers' Party
- Chinese Liberal Democratic Party
- Labor Party
- Third Society Party

Although some friction between 1949 Chinese immigrants and Taiwanese Aboriginals still exists, it has abated with time, and there has been a gradual melding of the two communities. In 1972, then-Premier Chiang Ching-kuo began a concentrated effort to bring Taiwanese into more senior position in the central administration and the KMT. Upon his accession to the presidency in January 1988, Lee Teng-hui, who is a native Taiwanese, continued this process. Steps by the government to redress past wrongs such as setting up a memorial to the victims of the February 28 Incident have contributed to this process.

== History ==
=== Early history ===
After the conquest of the Kingdom of Tungning by Qing admiral Shi Lang, Taiwan was brought under Qing rule from 1683 to 1895. After the First Sino-Japanese War, Qing China ceded Formosa and surrounding islands to Empire of Japan. Under Japanese rule, Taiwan had its governor general as its head of government under the constitutional monarchy led by the Emperor. Taiwanese citizens in Formosa and Pescadores were Japanese citizens until the end of World War II in 1945.

The Government of the Republic of China was formally established in 1912 in Nanjing, with Sun Yat-sen as President of the Provisional Government of the Republic of China under the Provisional Constitution of the Republic of China. After the successful Northern Expedition led by the Kuomintang (KMT) and its leader Chiang Kai-shek, the KMT managed to unify China nominally and established the National Government of the Republic of China (also known as the Nationalist Government; traditional Chinese: 國民政府; simplified Chinese: 国民政府; pinyin: Guómín Zhèngfǔ) with its capital in Nanjing, whose authority was maintained till the full-scale outbreak of the Second Sino-Japanese War in 1937. Prior to the retreat of the Republic of China to Taiwan in 1949, the Kuomintang (KMT) government of the Republic of China (ROC) took over administration of Taiwan from the Japanese. Escorted by George H. Kerr, KMT official Chen Yi officially accepted Japan's surrender on 25 October 1945 and proclaimed that day to be Retrocession Day. In the early years of KMT rule of Taiwan, rampant corruption in the new administration headed by Chen Yi caused high unemployment rates, widespread disease, and severe inflation, which in turn led to widespread local discontent. These domestic problems culminated in the eruption of an anti-government uprising in 1947.

The Constitution of the Republic of China was adopted by the National Assembly on 25 December 1946 and went into force a year later. The Tutelage Constitution of 1931 was replaced by the Constitution of the Republic of China in 1947. Chiang Kai-shek was also elected as the 1st President of the Republic of China under the constitution by the National Assembly in 1948, with Li Zongren being elected as vice-president. Chiang and Li inaugurated at the Presidential Palace in Nanjing on 20 May 1948, formally marking the transition from political tutelage to constitutional government.

=== Authoritarian rule ===
However, in 1946, the civil war with the communists led by Mao Zedong resumed despite mediation by the United States. Stretched and exhausted due to the long war with the Japanese, the Kuomintang-led government faced a disciplined and ever growing communist Red Army, which numbers grew in strength and was renamed as the People's Liberation Army (PLA) in 1946. The constitution was also superseded by the Temporary Provisions Effective During the Period of Communist Rebellion, which were a series of temporary constitutional provisions mainly to increase the powers of the president and suspended the two-term limit. The temporary provisions were passed by the National Assembly on 10 May 1948.

Although government forces were numerically superior and were equipped with modern weapons, they eventually lost due to low morale, defections, poor discipline as well as popular discontent with the ROC government due to skyrocketing inflation, corruption and administrative incompetence. Under intense pressure to take responsibility for the government's bleak outlook during the course of the civil war, Chiang resigned as president on 21 January 1949. The presidency was passed on to Vice-president Li Zongren, who was however unable to govern effectively due to Chiang pulling the strings behind government as Director-General of the Kuomintang. With the fall of Nanjing to the PLA in April 1949, the ROC government moved south to Guangzhou, and then to its wartime capital of Chongqing, and finally to Chengdu.

Sensing that he would eventually lose the mainland to the communists, Chiang secretly started preparations to move the government to the island of Taiwan, which was placed under the ROC's control on 25 October 1945. During that period, more than two million civilians, military personnel and government officials left the mainland for Taiwan. Chiang then declared Taipei as the provisional capital of the Republic of China on 7 December 1949, and left Chengdu for Taipei by air three days later when the city fell to the communists. The government imposed military repression in what became one of the longest imposition of martial law by any regime in the world, lasting a total of 38 years.

The National Assembly of the Republic of China was elected in mainland China in 1947 to officially carry out the duties of choosing the president, to amend the constitution, and to exercise the sovereignty of the citizens, but in actuality, the Assembly's role in Taipei seemed to reconfirm the executive powers of President Chiang Kai-shek. The National Assembly was re-established on Taiwan when the government moved. Because it was impossible to hold subsequent elections to represent constituencies in mainland China, representatives elected in 1947–48 held these seats "indefinitely."

After the death of Chiang Kai-shek in 1975, Vice President Yen Chia-kan briefly took over from 1975 to 1978, according to the Constitution, but the actual power was in the hands of Premier Chiang Ching-kuo, who was KMT chairman and son of Chiang Kai-shek. During the presidency of Chiang Ching-kuo from 1978 to 1988, Taiwan's political system began to undergo gradual liberalization. In 1977, Taiwan experienced its first mass political protest since the 1940s during the Zhongli Incident. Protesting election fraud by the KMT, a crowd of ten thousand clashed with soldiers and burned down a police station. In December 1979, a mass demonstration for democracy led to the Kaohsiung Incident in which police suppressed the demonstrations with violence, arresting dozens including eight opposition leaders known as the Kaohsiung Eight.

=== Transition to democracy ===
Changes in the political process were the result of the liberalizing trend that began in the 1980s under President Chiang Ching-kuo. In 1987, he lifted the emergency decree, which had been in place since 1948 and which had granted virtually unlimited powers to the president for use in the anti-communist campaign. This decree provided the basis for nearly four decades of martial law under which individuals and groups expressing dissenting views were dealt with harshly. Expressing views contrary to the authorities' claim to represent all of China or supporting independent Taiwan independence was treated as sedition. Since ending martial law, the Republic of China has taken dramatic steps to improve respect for human rights and create a democratic political system. Most restrictions on the press have ended, restrictions on personal freedoms have been relaxed, and the prohibition against organizing new political parties has been lifted. After the lifting of martial law, the opposition Democratic Progressive Party was formed and allowed to participate overtly in politics.

Vice-president Lee Teng-hui succeeded Chiang Ching-kuo as president when Chiang died on 13 January 1988. In June 1990, however, the Council of Grand Justices mandated the retirement, effective December 1991, of all remaining "indefinitely" elected members of the National Assembly, Legislative Yuan, and other bodies. Lee was elected by the National Assembly to a 6-year term in 1990, marking the final time a president was elected by the National Assembly. The second National Assembly, elected in 1991, was composed of 325 members. The majority was elected directly; 100 were chosen from party slates in proportion to the popular vote.

As the National Assembly took action in 1994 to allow for the popular election of the president, the LY in 1994 passed legislation to allow for the direct election of the governor of Taiwan Province and the mayors of Taipei and Kaohsiung Municipalities. These elections were held in December 1994, with the KMT winning the governor and Kaohsiung mayor posts, and the Democratic Progressive Party (DPP) winning the Taipei mayor's position. In March 1996, Lee Teng-hui was elected president and Lien Chan vice president in the first direct election by Taiwan's voters. In November 1997 local elections, the DPP won 12 of the 23 county magistrate and city mayor contests to the KMT's 8, outpolling the KMT for the first time in a major election. The position of elected governor and many other elements of the Taiwan Provincial Government were eliminated at the end of 1998. The stated purpose of this was to streamline administrative efficiency, but some commentators have argued that this was also intended to weaken the power base of Governor James Soong. In 1998, the KMT's Ma Ying-jeou wrestled back control of the mayorship of Taipei from the opposition DPP's most prominent figure Chen Shui-bian. In the same elections, however, the DPP's Frank Hsieh managed to defeat Kaoshiung's KMT incumbent.

In 2000, Chen Shui-bian of the pro-independence Democratic Progressive Party (DPP) was elected president, marking the first peaceful democratic shift in governance to an opposition party in ROC history and a decisive end to the KMT's governmental monopoly. The election also had the effect of splitting the KMT's support base. James Soong launched an independent bid for the presidency after failing to be nominated by the party. In response the KMT expelled Soong and his supporters. Soong and his supporters blamed then-KMT Chairman Lee Teng-hui of harboring pro-independence sentiments and purposely trying to aid Chen Shui-bian by splitting the KMT's vote by running the less charismatic Lien Chan along with Soong. After losing the vote narrowly to Chen and ahead of Lien, Soong established the People First Party. Lee Teng-hui was soon forced out of the KMT Chairmanship amid popular protests and riots demanding he take responsibility for the KMT's defeat. In the months following the 2000 presidential election, Lee Teng-hui's supporters established the Taiwan Solidarity Union, which advocated a more radical brand of Taiwan independence than the DPP. For this, Lee was expelled from the KMT and the KMT gradually moved itself to a more conservative and pro-unification position. This permitted the formation of two rival coalitions that have since dominated Taiwanese politics: the Pan-Blue Coalition formed by the KMT, People First Party, and New Party and the Pan-Green Coalition formed by the Democratic Progressive Party and Taiwan Solidarity Union.

In April 2000, the members of the National Assembly voted to permit their terms of office to expire without holding new elections. They also determined that such an election would be called in the event the National Assembly is needed to decide a presidential recall or a constitutional amendment. In the 2001 LY elections, the DPP won a plurality of seats for the first time. However, the Pan-Blue Coalition held a small majority over the Pan-Green Coalition, causing much of President Chen's agenda to be derailed. This also gave independents in the legislature more power, some of whom founded the Non-Partisan Solidarity Union in 2004. In both of Chen's terms, the DPP and the independence-leaning Pan-Green Coalition failed to secure a majority in the legislature, losing to the KMT and the pro-unification leaning Pan-Blue Coalition. This has led to many impasses; the president in the ROC system does not have the power of veto, so the legislature is not required to obtain the assent of the executive branch in order to make laws.

In the 2004 presidential election, the day after being shot while campaigning, Chen was reelected by a narrow margin of 0.2%. The KMT filed lawsuits to demand a recount, alleged voting fraud and staged huge rallies to demand a new election. The courts ruled that the election was accurate and valid. The March election also included a "peace referendum". Historically, the issue of referendums has been closely tied to the question of Taiwan independence, and thus has been a sensitive issue in cross Strait relations. There were two referendums before the voters on 20 March 2004. The first asked in light of the PRC missile threat whether the ROC should purchase anti-missile systems. The second asked whether Taiwan should adopt a "peace framework" for addressing cross Strait differences with the PRC. However both referendums failed to obtain support from over 50% of registered voters, as required to be valid. The Pan-Blue Coalition campaigned against the referendum as unnecessary and urged voters to boycott it.

President Chen Shui-bian has called for major constitutional reforms by 2006 aimed at further reducing layers of government, and making other structural changes aimed at improving governance. The People's Republic of China has accused Chen of using the constitution issue to move Taiwan towards independence. He expressed opposition, however, in his 20 May 2004 inaugural address to using constitutional reform to alter the constitution's definition of Taiwan sovereignty. The Legislative Yuan passed a set of constitutional amendments on 23 August 2004 that halve the number of LY seats and create single-member districts. The revisions also eliminate the role of the National Assembly and permit the public to confirm or reject future revisions passed by the LY. In 2005, the National Assembly permanently abolished itself by ratifying a constitution amendment passed by the Legislative Yuan.

Prior to the 11 December 2004 elections to the Legislative Yuan, signs indicated that the DPP would for the first time dominate the Legislative Yuan. Polls projected a huge pan-green victory, and the DPP's election tactics were based on them. This over-reliance on polls resulted in a huge setback. The pan-blue opposition managed to maintain their majority status within the Legislative Yuan, winning 114 seats out of the 225 seats. The Pan-Green only managed to win 101 seats. The remaining 10 seats were won by the independent candidates. Although the Pan-Green coalition increased their seats by one and the DPP remained the largest party, because of raised hopes the election was viewed as a disaster, and President Chen resigned his post as Chairman of DPP as a result. On 3 December 2005, the KMT made major gains in municipal elections, taking 14 of 23 mayor or county magistrate seats, while the DPP retained only six seats of their previous 10. The pan-blue People First Party and New Party each took one seat, and an independent won one seat. The pan-green TSU was completely shut out. DPP chairman Su Tseng-chang had promised to resign to take responsibility for the defeat. This dramatic setback for the DPP and pan-greens was seen as a reaction to recent corruption scandals, and public disapproval of Chen Shui-Bian's apparent refusal to improve cross-strait relations.

In January 2008, opposition party Kuomintang won a landslide victory in legislative election. President Chen Shui-bian's Democratic Progressive Party (DPP) lost. In March 2008, Ma Ying-jeou of Kuomintang party was elected as president. In January 2012, President Ma Ying-jeou was re-elected. In January 2016, Democratic Progressive Party candidate Tsai Ing-wen won presidential election. She became the first female president of Republic of China. In January 2020, Tsai was re-elected, and in the simultaneous legislative election, President Tsai's Democratic Progressive Party (DPP) won a majority, with 61 out of 113 seats. The Kuomintang (KMT) got 38 seats.

In the 21st century, Taiwan's political system has been moving towards digital democracy with increased participation from civil society and greater transparency from the government. In January 2024, William Lai Ching-te of the ruling Democratic Progressive Party won the 2024 Taiwanese presidential election. However, no party won a majority in the simultaneous Taiwan's legislative election for the first time since 2004, meaning 51 seats for the Democratic Progressive Party (DPP), 52 seats for the Kuomintang (KMT), and the Taiwan People's Party (TPP) secured eight seats.

== Issues ==
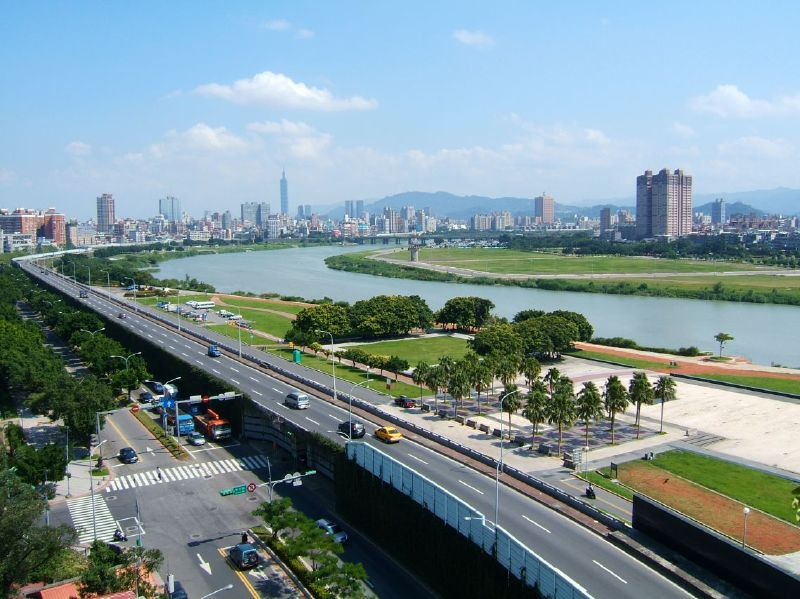
A highway section in Taipei, Taiwan.

Other major political issues include the passage of an arms procurement bill that the United States authorized in 2001. In 2008, however, the United States were reluctant to send over more arms to Taiwan out of fear that it would hinder the recent improvement of ties between China and Taiwan. Another major political issue is the establishment of a National Communications Commission to take over from the Government Information Office, whose advertising budget exercised great control over the media.

Banking reform, including consumer finance (limiting rates on credit cards) and bank mergers, is also a major issue. Taiwan's financial sector is quite unwieldy, with over 48 banks, none of which have a market share over 10%. In addition, the government controls 50% to 60% of Taiwan's banking assets. The ultimate aim is the creation of large financial institutions that will then have the ability to compete internationally.

=== Political status ===
One key issue has been the political status of Taiwan itself. With the diplomatic isolation brought about in the 1970s and 1980s, the notion of "recovering the mainland" by force has been dropped and the Taiwanese localization movement strengthened. The relationship with the People's Republic of China and the related issues of Taiwan independence and Chinese unification continue to dominate Taiwanese politics.

The political scene in the ROC is divided into two camps, with the pro-unification KMT, People First Party, and New Party forming the Pan-Blue Coalition; and the Democratic Progressive Party (DPP) and strongly pro-independence Social Democratic Party, and Taiwan Statebuilding Party (TSP) forming the Pan-Green Coalition. Because of the dominance of the unification-independence issue in Taiwan's political scene, it is difficult to categorise either camp as "right" or "left" on the conventional basis of economic or social policies.

Supporters of the Pan-Green camp tend to favor emphasizing the Republic of China as being a distinct country from the People's Republic of China. Many Pan-Green supporters seek formal Taiwan independence and for dropping the title of the Republic of China. However, more progressive members of the coalition, such as former President Chen Shui-bian, have moderated their views and claim that it is unnecessary to proclaim independence because Taiwan is already "an independent, sovereign country" and that the Republic of China is the same as Taiwan. Some members take a much more extreme view about Taiwan's status, claiming that the ROC is nonexistent and calling for the establishment of an independent "Republic of Taiwan". Supporters of this idea have even gone as far as issuing self-made "passports" for their republic. Attempts to use these "passports" however, have been stopped by officials at Chiang Kai-shek International Airport.

While the Pan-Green camp favors Taiwan having an identity separate from that of China, some Pan-Blue members, especially former leaders from the older generation, seem to be strongly supportive of the concept of the Republic of China, which remains an important symbol of their links with China. During his visit to mainland China in April 2005, former KMT Party Chairman Lien Chan reiterated his party's belief in the "One China" policy that states that there is only one China controlled by two governments and that Taiwan is a part of China. PFP Party Chair James Soong expressed the same sentiments during his visit in May. In contrast to the positions of these two leaders of the older generation, the more mainstream Pan-Blue position is to pursue negotiations with the PRC to immediately open direct transportation links with China and to lift investment restrictions. With regards to independence, the mainstream Pan-Blue position is to simply maintain the ROC's current state, and being open to negotiations for unification after China is democratized enough to respect human rights.

For its part, the PRC has indicated that it finds a Republic of China far more acceptable than an independent Taiwan. Although it views the ROC as an illegitimate entity, it has stated that any effort on Taiwan to formally abolish the ROC or formally renounce its claim over mainland China would result in a strong and possibly military reaction. However, the defense of Taiwan by the US and Japan is likely, so it is not, in reality, clear what the PRC reaction would be. The US's current position is that the Taiwan issue must be resolved peacefully and that it condemns unilateral action by either side, an unprovoked invasion by China or a declaration of formal independence by Taiwan.

A. M. Rosenthal, former executive editor of The New York Times accused China of fostering an "apartheid" policy toward Taiwan. Dr Tan Sun Chen, Taiwan's Minister of Foreign Affairs, asserts that China's obstruction in the international community has led to a "political apartheid" which "harms the human rights, interests, and dignity of Taiwan's people.".

=== National identity ===
Roughly 84% of Taiwan's population descends from Han Chinese who migrated from mainland China between 1661 and 1895. Another significant fraction descends from Han Chinese who immigrated from mainland China in the 1940s and 1950s. But between 1895 and the present, Taiwan and mainland China have shared a common government for only 4 years. The shared cultural origin combined with several hundred years of geographical separation, some hundred years of political separation and foreign influences, as well as hostility between the rival Taiwan and China have resulted in national identity being a contentious issue with political overtones. Since democratization and the lifting of martial law, a distinct Taiwanese identity (as opposed to Taiwanese identity as a subset of a Chinese identity) is often at the heart of political debates. Its acceptance makes the island distinct from mainland China, and therefore may be seen as a step towards forming a consensus for de jure Taiwan independence. The pan-green camp supports a distinct Taiwanese identity, while the pan-blue camp supports a Chinese identity only. The KMT has downplayed this stance in the recent years and now supports a Taiwanese identity as part of a Chinese identity.

According to a survey conducted in March 2009, 49% of the respondents consider themselves as Taiwanese only, and 44% of the respondents consider themselves as Taiwanese and Chinese. 3% consider themselves as only Chinese. Another survey, conducted in Taiwan in July 2009, showed that 82.8% of respondents consider that Taiwan and China are two separate countries developing each on its own. A recent survey conducted in December 2009 showed that 62% of the respondents consider themselves as Taiwanese only, and 22% of the respondents consider themselves as both Taiwanese and Chinese. 8% consider themselves as only Chinese. The survey also shows that among 18- to 29-year-old respondents, 75% consider themselves as Taiwanese only.

Percentage of Taiwanese residents who consider themselves Taiwanese, Chinese or Taiwanese and Chinese according to various surveys
Survey	Taiwanese	Chinese	Taiwanese and Chinese
Research, Development, and Evaluation Commission, Executive Yuan (April 2008)	67.1%	13.6%	15.2%
TVBS Poll Center (June 2008)	45%	4%	45%
Common Wealth Magazine (December 2009)	62%	8%	22%
National Chengchi University (June 2010)	51.6%	3.8%	40.4%
TVBS Poll Center (March 2009)	72%	16%	(not an option for this question)
TVBS Poll Center (March 2009)	49%	3%	44%

=== Cross-strait relations ===
The dominant political issue today in Taiwan is its relationship with the Government of the People's Republic of China (PRC) that has jurisdiction over mainland China. Specifically, many people in Taiwan desire the opening of direct transportation links with mainland China, including direct flights, which would aid many Taiwanese businesses that have opened factories or branches in mainland China. The former DPP administration feared that such links will lead to tighter economic and thus political integration with the PRC, and in the 2006 Lunar New Year Speech, Chen Shui-bian called for managed opening of links.

Mainland China and Taiwan resumed regular direct flights or cross-Strait relations on 4 July 2008, after six decades, as a "new start" in their tense relations. Liu Shaoyong, chair of China Southern Airlines, piloted the first flight from Guangzhou to Taipei (Taoyuan International Airport). Simultaneously, a Taiwan-based China Airlines flight flew to Shanghai. Five mainland Chinese cities will be connected with eight Taiwan airports, with 4 days a week, 36 round-trip flights across the Taiwan Strait, thereby eliminating time-consuming Hong Kong stopovers.

Despite the differences between Taiwan and mainland China, contact between the two sides of the Taiwan Strait has grown significantly over the past decade. The ROC has continued to relax restrictions on unofficial contacts with the PRC, and cross-strait interaction has mushroomed. Since 1987, when the ban on travel to mainland China was lifted, Taiwan residents have made more than 10 million trips to mainland China. The ROC Bureau of Foreign Trade estimates that indirect trade with mainland China reached about US$61.639 billion, or 18% of the total trade of the ROC, in 2004. This indirect trade runs heavily in Taiwan's favor, providing another outlet for the island's booming economy. In an attempt to facilitate trade, in 1995 the Executive Yuan approved the construction of an offshore transshipment center at the port of Kaohsiung through which direct shipping with the mainland would be permitted. In April 1997 the first sanctioned direct cross-strait shipping began between selected mainland China ports and Kaohsiung for cargo being transshipped through Taiwan.

Beijing has expressed a mixed view of these developments. PRC leaders are pleased at the development of economic ties and exchanges, which they believe helps their cause of unification. However, the increase in contacts, combined with domestic political liberalization on Taiwan, also has resulted in more open discussion in Taiwan of the future of Taiwan, including the option of independence, to which Beijing is strongly opposed.

When Lee Teng-hui visited his alma mater in the US in 1995, this caused harsh criticism from the PRC, which ultimately led to the Third Taiwan Strait Crisis. Lee Teng-hui's characterization in 1999 of relations between the ROC and mainland China as "between two states" was denounced by the Chinese government; Lee partially changed his earlier statement and referred to the 1992 Consensus between the ROC and the PRC. Taiwan business representatives have concerns about issues such as safety, corruption, and contract disputes, which have led to increased caution and a search for alternative investment venues but not to pulling out from mainland China altogether. President Chen has yet to revise the previous administration's "no haste, be patient" policy regarding Taiwan-mainland China investment to prevent over-dependence on the PRC. As a result of this policy the ROC placed restrictions on large-scale infrastructure investments on mainland China in 1997.

The development of semi official cross-strait relations has been incremental. Prior to April 1993, when talks were held in Singapore between the heads of two private intermediary organizations – Taiwan's Straits Exchange Foundation (SEF) and the PRC's Association for Relations Across the Taiwan Straits (ARATS) – there had been some lower-level exchanges between the two sides of the Strait. The April 1993 SEF-ARATS talks primarily addressed technical issues relating to cross-strait interactions. Lower-level talks continued on a fairly regular basis until they were suspended by Beijing in 1995 after President Lee's U.S. visit. Unofficial exchanges resumed in 1997 through informal meetings between personnel of the two sides' unofficial representative organizations. Direct SEF-ARATS contacts resumed in April 1998, and the SEF Chairman visited mainland China in October 1998. A planned visit by ARATS Chairman Wang Daohan to Taiwan in the fall, however, was postponed following statements made by then-President Lee Teng-hui that relations between mainland China and Taiwan should be conducted as "state-to-state" or at least as "special state-to-state relations." Since his 20 May 2000 inauguration, President Chen has called for resuming the cross-strait dialogue without any preconditions. President Chen has stated that such talks should be conducted on the basis of the "spirit of 1992," a reference to the agreement to hold the 1993 Singapore talks. The PRC, however, has insisted that President Chen must recognize the one China principle before talks can be held.

In April 2026, Cheng Li-wun, chair of Taiwan's opposition KMT, visited Beijing and met Xi Jinping, General Secretary of the Chinese Communist Party, who stated that people on both sides of the Taiwan Strait are Chinese and expressed a desire for peace. Cheng called for closer cross-strait ties, prompting debate in Taiwan over the island's political stance and potential influence from Beijing ahead of the 2028 election.

In August 2026, Taiwan's Mainland Affairs Council warned about China's new entry and exit rules could stop some Taiwanese travellers from leaving the country and could impose exit bans on national security or national interest grounds, with such restrictions lasting between six months and three years.

== See also ==
- Elections in Taiwan
- Foreign relations of Taiwan
- List of political parties in Taiwan
- Conservatism in Taiwan
- Black gold (politics)
- Iron vote
- Legislative violence
- History of Taiwan
