= Xie Yingzhou =

Chinese jurist

- 謝瀛洲
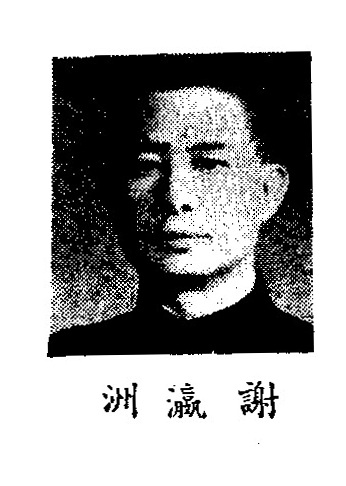

Vice President of the Judicial Yuan
- In office July 1966 – 20 April 1972
- President: Xie Guansheng; Tien Chung-chin
- Preceded by: Fu Bingchang
- Succeeded by: Tai Yen-hui

President of the Supreme Court of the Republic of China
- In office 13 July 1948 – 1966
- Preceded by: Xia Qin
- Succeeded by: Zha Liangjian

Personal details
- Born: 21 July 1894 Tsungfa, Kwangtung, China
- Died: 20 April 1972 Taipei, Taiwan
- Party: Kuomintang
- Spouse: Gao Yicha
- Education: University of Paris

Chinese name
- Traditional Chinese: 謝瀛洲
- Simplified Chinese: 谢瀛洲
Transcriptions
Standard Mandarin
- Hanyu Pinyin: Xiè Yíngzhōu
- Bopomofo: ㄒㄧㄝˋㄧㄥˊㄓㄡ
- Wade–Giles: Hsieh^{4} Ying^{2}-chou^{1}
Yue: Cantonese
- Jyutping: Ze^{6} Jing^{4}-zau^{1}
Southern Min
- Tâi-lô: Tsiā Îng-tsiu

Xie Yingzhou (Chinese: 謝瀛洲; 1894–1972) was a Chinese-born jurist.

== Career ==
Xie Yingzhou was born in 1894 to accountant Xie Weinan, who later served on the Guangdong Advisory Council. Xie's courtesy name was Xianting. He was educated in Tsungfa, and completed secondary education elsewhere in Guangdong and Shanghai. Xie married Gao Yicha at the age of 20, then left for France, where he pursued legal studies at the University of Paris.

Xie returned to China in 1924, joined the Kuomintang, and was offered a position on the faculty of law at National Guangdong University by school president Zou Lu.

The next year, Xie was named to positions within the Guangdong branch of the Kuomintang, working alongside Gu Ying-fen. In 1927, Xie began teaching at the Republic of China Military Academy, National Central University in Nanking and the Peking University Law School. On 6 November 1928, Xie started working at the Examination Yuan. That December, he transferred to the Ministry of Justice, where he remained until 1932. He was then named a member of the Guangdong Provincial Government, serving as provincial minister of education from 1933. In February 1935, Xie was appointed to the Guangdong High Court. He retired from the bench in 1937. His judgeship overlapped with his stint as dean of the Guangdong School of Law and as a member of the Southwestern Government Affairs Committee, which he left in November 1936 to take a position at the National Audit Office. He remained at the National Audit Office until September 1945.

Subsequently, Xie returned to the Ministry of Justice until he was elected to the presidium of the National Assembly in 1947. Shortly after Xie was seated, he was named secretary general of the Taiwan Provincial Government, serving between 18 September 1947 and 20 July 1948. On 13 July 1948, Xie became president of the Supreme Court.

Xie moved to Taiwan in October 1949, and taught law at National Taiwan University, National Chengchi University, and Soochow University. He remained president of the supreme court until 1966. After the death of Fu Bingchang, Xie succeeded him as vice president of the Judicial Yuan. Xie died in Taipei on 20 April 1972, and was replaced by Tai Yen-hui.

Xie's grandson Ming Hsieh founded Cogent Systems.
