= Xie Guansheng =

Chinese jurist and politician

- 謝冠生
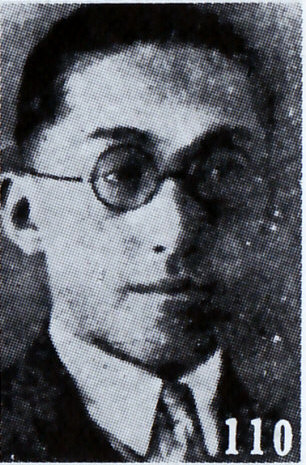
- Image of Xie published in The Most Recent Biographies of Chinese Dignitaries (1941)

President of the Judicial Yuan
- In office 18 March 1958 – 29 November 1971 acting until 14 June 1958
- Vice President: Fu Bingchang; Xie Yingzhou
- Preceded by: Wang Ch'ung-hui
- Succeeded by: Tien Chung-chin

Vice President of the Judicial Yuan
- In office May 1950 – June 1958
- President: Wang Ch'ung-hui
- Preceded by: Shi Zhiquan
- Succeeded by: Fu Bingchang

Minister of Justice
- In office August 1937 – December 1948
- Preceded by: Wang Yongbin
- Succeeded by: Mei Ju-ao

Personal details
- Born: 19 November 1897 Shengxian, Zhejiang, China
- Died: 22 December 1971 (aged 74) Taipei, Taiwan
- Party: Kuomintang
- Education: University of Paris (PhD)

Xie Shouchang (Chinese: 謝壽昌; Wade–Giles: Hsieh Kuan-sheng; 19 November 1897 – 22 December 1971), known by his courtesy name Xie Guansheng (謝冠生), was a Chinese jurist who served as Minister of Justice from 1937 to 1948. After the government of the Republic of China moved to Taiwan, Xie was President of the Judicial Yuan from 1958 to 1971.

== Career ==
Xie was born in Shengxian, Zhejiang. His grandfather, Xie Tingjun, was a businessman, and his father, Xie Kuang, a scholar. Upon graduating from primary school in 1910, Xie Guansheng was admitted to Hangzhou High School. Two years later, Xie transferred to Xuhui High School, where he graduated and later became a teacher. Xie left teaching to join the Commercial Press, where he helped publish the first edition of the Ciyuan, released in 1915. Xie later served as secretary to Yve Henry, who invited him to study law at Aurora University in Shanghai. Xie later furthered his legal education at the University of Paris, where he earned a doctorate.

After returning to China, Xie taught law at Aurora University and Fudan University, among other schools. In 1926, Xie was invited to join the Wuhan-based Nationalist government as a secretary for the Ministry of Foreign Affairs. Xie remained in his post after the Nationalist government had been consolidated in Nanjing. Concurrently, he was dean of the law school at National Central University. In April 1930, Xie began work for the Judicial Yuan. He moved to the Ministry of Justice in October 1934, becoming secretary of the ministry in March 1936.

Xie succeeded Wang Yongbin as justice minister in August 1937. In May 1945, Xie was elected to the Kuomintang Central Committee. On April 23, 1947, Xie was appointed to a special committee of the Executive Yuan. He continued serving as minister of justice until December 1948, when he was named the secretary-general of the Judicial Yuan.

Xie retreated to Taiwan with other Nationalist government officials after the Kuomintang lost the Second Chinese Civil War. In May 1950, he was named Vice President of the Judicial Yuan, serving until March 1958, when he was promoted to President of the Judicial Yuan.

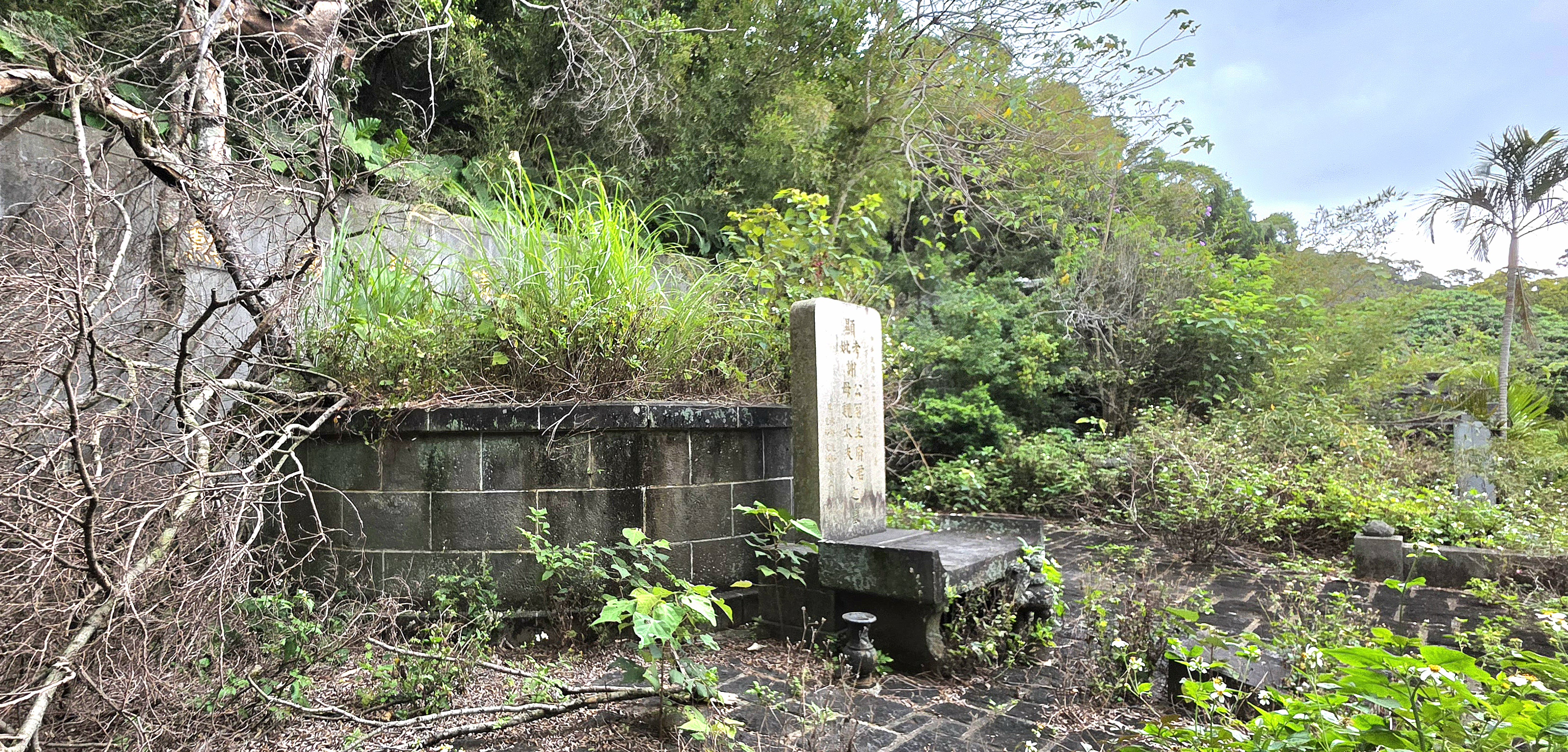
Xie Guansheng' s Tomb at Shibafen, Beitou District, Taipei.

Xie died on 22 December 1971 in Taipei, weeks after stepping down as President of the Judicial Yuan.
