= Foo Ping-sheung =

Republic of China politician

- 傅秉常
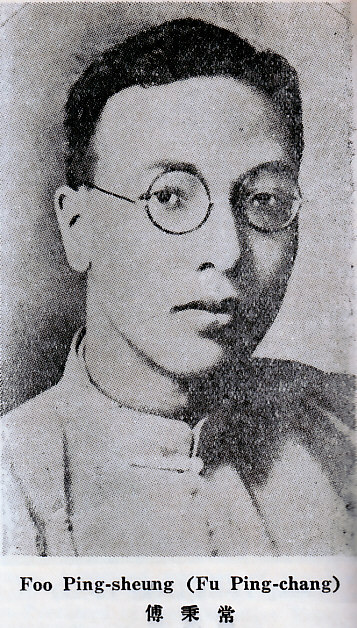
- Fu Bingchang in the 4th edition of《中國名人錄》（Who's Who in China）

Vice President of the Judicial Yuan
- In office June 1958 – July 1965
- President: Hsieh Kuan-sheng
- Preceded by: Shi Zhiquan
- Succeeded by: Xie Yingzhou (After a 1 year vacancy)

Personal details
- Born: 1895 or 1896 Nanhai, Foshan, Guangdong, Qing dynasty
- Died: 29 July 1965 (age 69-70) Taipei, Taiwan (Republic of China province), Republic of China
Foo Ping-sheung
- Chinese: 傅秉常
Transcriptions
Standard Mandarin
- Hanyu Pinyin: Fù Bǐngcháng
- Bopomofo: ㄈㄨˋ ㄅㄧㄥˇ ㄔㄤˊ
- Wade–Giles: Fu^{4} Ping^{3}-ch'ang^{2}
Hakka
- Pha̍k-fa-sṳ: Fu Pín-sòng
Yue: Cantonese
- Jyutping: Fu^{6} Bing^{2}soeng^{4}
Southern Min
- Hokkien POJ: Pò͘ Péng-siông
- Tâi-lô: Pòo Píng-siông

Foo Ping-sheung (Chinese: 傅秉常; pinyin: Fù Bǐngcháng; 1895–1965) was a diplomat and politician in the early Republic of China and later in Taiwan.

Foo was born to a well off family in Foshan, Guangdong. At the age of ten, he was sent to St. Stephen’s College in Hong Kong, and then trained as a civil engineer at Hong Kong University.

== Politics ==
Foo quickly turned to political service for his uncle by marriage, Wu Ting-fang, then was an attache for the Canton Delegation of the Paris Peace Conference. He became secretary to Sun Yat-sen, an experience which led to his becoming Vice-Minister for Foreign Affairs of the Nationalist Government 1927. As a prominent member of the Prince’s Clique (Taizi pai), a political network headed by Sun Ke, the son of Sun Yatsen, Fu held various positions in the Foreign Ministry, then became a member of the Central Executive Committee of the Kuomintang in 1935. He was Republic of China's Ambassador to the U. S. S. R. from 1943 to 1949.

== Semi-retirement and later years ==
Foo retired to Paris and lived there from 1949 to 1956. He then returned to work for Chiang Kai-shek as President of the Anti-Corruption Board and Vice President of the Judicial Yuan in Taiwan until his death in 1965.

Foo was an avid amateur photographer who took informal photos of leading politicians and their families.

== Family ==
Foo's eldest daughter, Katherine (傅锦培), married Bin Cheng, a renowned legal scholar who served as Dean of the University College London Faculty of Laws.

== Bibliography ==
- 羅香林, 傅秉常与近代中国 (1975) (Luo Xianglin, Foo Ping-sheung and modern China)
- 傅秉常先生訪問紀錄 (The Reminiscences of Mr. Foo Ping-sheung) (中央研究院近代史研究所, Academia Sinica, Institute of Modern History, Oral History Series No. 45, 1993)
- 蒋介石最后一任驻苏大使傅秉常在苏联的日子 'Foo Ping-sheung: Chiang Kai-shek’s last Ambassador to Soviet Russia', (2007) Republican Archives, Issue 4, pp: 55-60. ISSN 1000-4491.
- Yee-Wah Foo (ed.) Chiang Kaishek’s Last Ambassador to Moscow, The Wartime Diaries of Fu Bingchang (2011) Palgrave Macmillan., ISBN 978-0-230-58477-8
