= Supreme Prosecutors Office =

Prosecution authority of Taiwan

- 最高檢察署; Zuìgāo Jiǎnchá Shǔ (Mandarin); Chui-kô Kiám-chhat Su (Hakka)
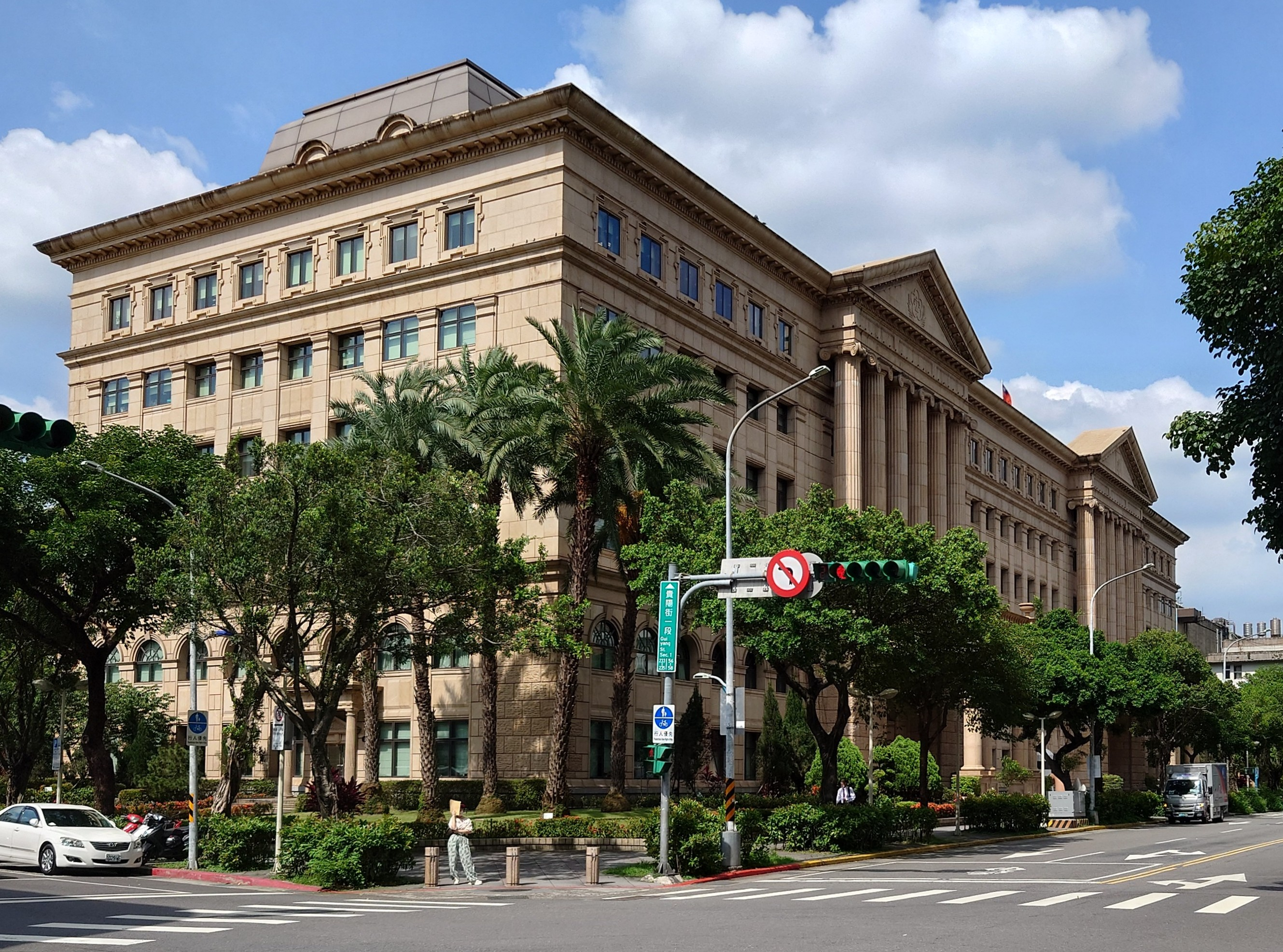

Agency overview
- Formed: 16 November 1928
- Jurisdiction: Republic of China
- Headquarters: Zhongzheng, Taipei, Taiwan; 25.039336°N 121.509534°E
- Agency executive: Hsing Tai-chao, Prosecutor-General
- Parent agency: Ministry of Justice
- Website: Official website

The Supreme Prosecutors Office (traditional Chinese: 最高檢察署; simplified Chinese: 最高检察署; pinyin: Zuìgāo Fǎyuàn Jiǎnchá Shǔ; Pe̍h-ōe-jī: Chòe-ko Kiám-chhat Sú) is the highest prosecution authority in the Republic of China (Taiwan).

== Organizational structure ==
- Statistics Office
- Accounting Office
- Civil Service Ethics Office
- Personnel Office
- Information Management Office

== Prosecutor general ==
The Prosecutor General of the Supreme Prosecutors Office is the highest-ranking member of the prosecution system. The position is appointed by the president, and must be confirmed by the Legislative Yuan. The position carries a term limit of four years, and the appointee cannot serve consecutive terms. Notably, the prosecutor general has the exclusive authority to file extraordinary appeals.

=== List of prosecutors general ===
- Huang Shih-ming (– April 2014)
- Yen Da-ho (April 2014 – May 2018)
- Chiang Hui-min (May 2018 – May 2022)
- Hsing Tai-chao (May 2022 –)

== Transportation ==
The office is accessible within walking distance South of Ximen Station or North of Xiaonanmen Station of the Taipei Metro.

== See also ==
- History of law in Taiwan
- Law of Taiwan
- Six Codes
- Constitution of the Republic of China
- Judicial Yuan
- Supreme Court of the Republic of China
- High Court (Taiwan)
- District Courts (Taiwan)
- Ministry of Justice (Taiwan)
- Taiwan High Prosecutors Office
- List of law schools in Taiwan
- Director of Public Prosecutions
- Supreme People's Procuratorate
- September 2013 power struggle
