= Extraordinary appeal =

An extraordinary appeal is a special relief litigation procedure established in several Civil Law Systems, with an aim to correct judicial errors, wrongful convictions, and unifying the interpretation of statutes and regulations. As a general rule, it is designed for the benefit of the defendant. Typically it can only be filed under circumstances where the final court decision in question is unfavorable to the defendant, and the defendant might be eligible for exoneration or sentence reduction due to such appeal.

== Explanation ==
Normally, no matter how obvious an error is in a verdict or judgement, it cannot be corrected unless either party appeals. Therefore, if the verdict in question is from a supreme court, there would be absolutely no relief due to the lack of a superior court. In order to deal with the possibility of the supreme court making a mistake, extraordinary appeal was introduced as a remedy to correct any finalized court decisions. Although there are no limits regarding how many extraordinary appeals can be filed per case, it does not imply that defendants get infinite chances of appeal. To reflect this, extraordinary appeals are subject to strict conditions, such as only allowed to be filed by the Prosecutor General of a judicial system, the appeal itself does not halt the punishment, and the applicant is only allowed to dispute errors in legal procedures i.e. any extraordinary appeal shall be based upon the facts recognized by the original court and the supreme court shall only examine whether the correct law is properly applied to the recognized facts, but not the facts themselves.

== History ==
Extraordinary Appeal originates from the "Cassation in the Interest of the Public" clause in the French Constitution of 1791. The clause was later established with a wider scope of application in the Code of Criminal Procedure of 1808 and 1959. Inspired by France, an "extraordinary appeal" clause was included in the Japanese Code of Criminal Procedure of 1880.

== Countries ==
=== Japan ===
Extraordinary Appeal in Japan is established in part 5 of the Code of Criminal Procedure.

=== South Korea ===
Extraordinary Appeal in South Korea is established in chapter 2, part 4 of the Criminal Procedure Act.

=== Taiwan ===
Extraordinary Appeal in Taiwan is established in part 6 of the Code of Criminal Procedure, which was mostly inspired by the Japanese Code of Criminal Procedure. The application for an extraordinary appeal is an exclusive authority of the Prosecutor General of the Supreme Prosecutors Office. Thus, if any defendant or subordinate prosecutor considers a final court decision to be illegal, they must contact the Prosecutor General for approval. The motion for an extraordinary appeal itself does not halt any punishment sentenced by the original ruling.

A legal extraordinary appeal must fit the following conditions:

1. The court decision in question must be final,
2. The court decision in question is in contravention of laws, and
3. Must be filed by the Prosecutor General of the Supreme Prosecutors Office, to the Supreme Court.

If the extraordinary appeal is found to be unreasonable:

- The appeal is rejected, and the original court decision is not affected.

If the extraordinary appeal is found to be reasonable:

- If the original court decision is unfavorable to the defendant, and:
  - The violation of laws is within evidence acquisition and interpretation: reverse and remand the court decision in question. However, the receiving lower court must not issue a higher sentence than the old one in the reversed judgement, if still deemed guilty.
  - The violation of law is purely legal procedure error: Reverse the original decision and resentence the defendant.
- If the original court decision is favorable to the defendant, the Supreme Court should declare the court decision in question illegal (but not reversed), thus has no effect on the defendant.

The Extraordinary Appeal procedure in Taiwan is, indeed as its name, an extraordinary means of relief, but not the last resort for criminal procedure; a case can still be appealed to the Constitutional Court if related laws or the ruling itself is considered in violation of the Constitution.
