= Xia Qin =

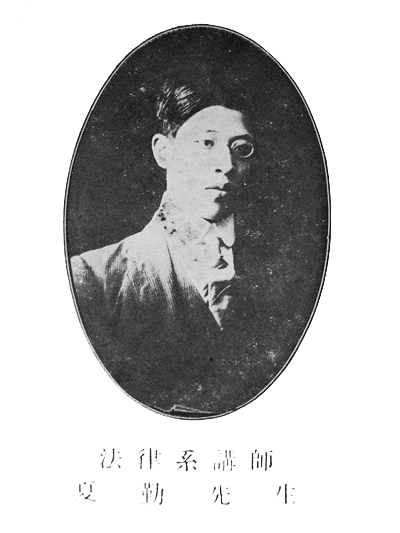
A picture of Xia Qin

Xia Qin (Chinese: 夏勤) (1892–1950) was President of the Supreme Court of the Republic of China (February 3, 1945 – July 13, 1948). He was born in Taizhou, Jiangsu. In early life, he studied abroad at the university of Tokyo, Japan and returned to China in 1917. He joined the government of the Republic of China in August 1927. He died of diabetes in Hong Kong, where he went after the Chinese Communist Party's takeover of the mainland following victory in the Chinese Civil War.
