= Supreme Court (Taiwan) =

Highest ordinary court of Taiwan

Coordinates: 25°2′24″N 121°30′35.6″E

- 最高法院; Zuìgāo Fǎyuàn (Mandarin); Chui-kô Fap-yen (Hakka)

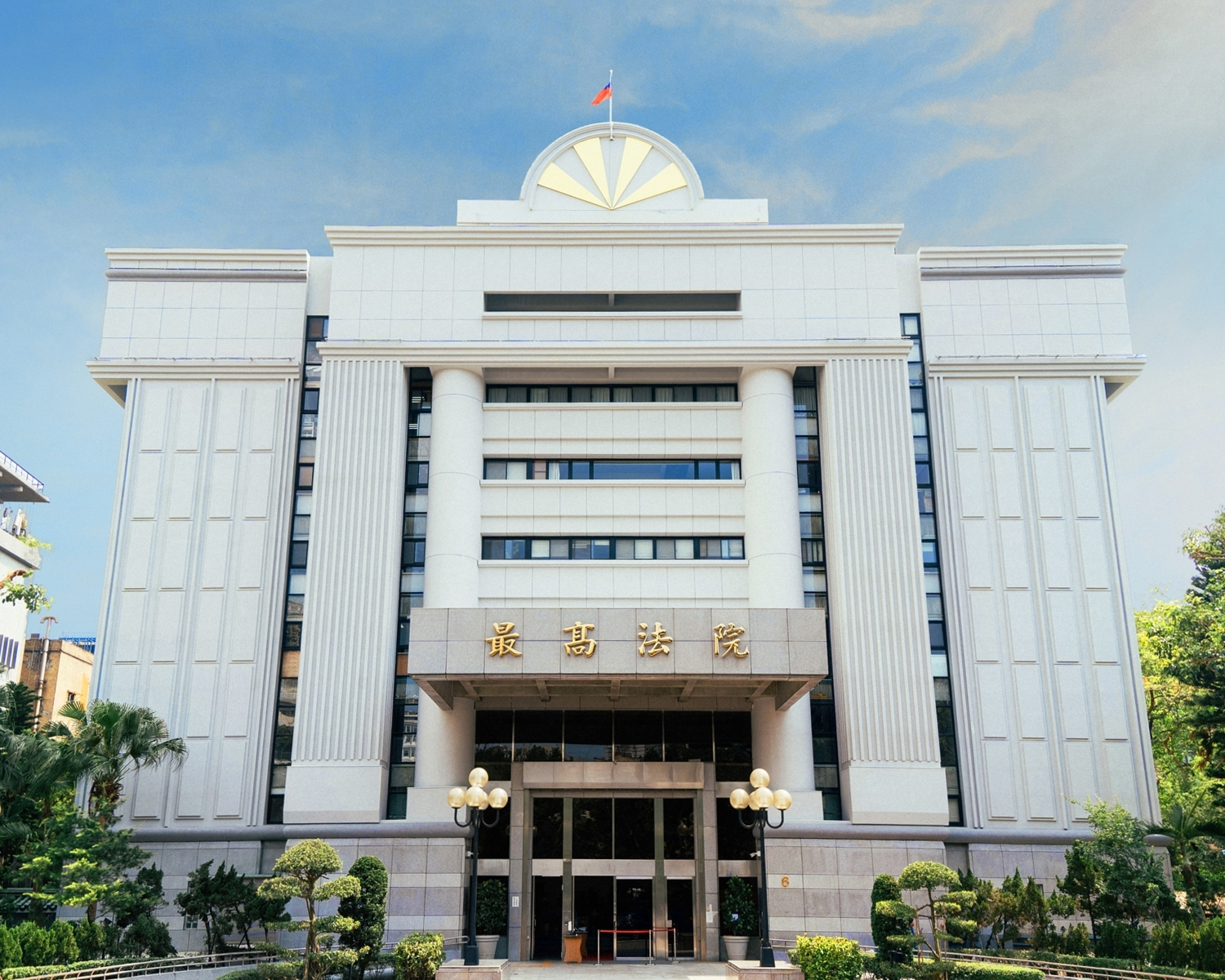
- The Supreme Court Building
- Interactive map of Supreme Court
- Established: 1927
- Jurisdiction: Republic of China
- Location: Zhongzheng, Taipei, Taiwan
- Authorised by: Additional Articles of the Constitution and Court Organic Act
- Number of positions: 70 (in 2015)
- Website: tps.judicial.gov.tw

Chief Justice
- Currently: Kao Meng-hsun
- Since: 2023

Supreme Court
- Chinese: 最高法院
Transcriptions
Standard Mandarin
- Hanyu Pinyin: Zuìgāo Fǎyuàn
- Bopomofo: ㄗㄨㄟˋ ㄍㄠ ㄈㄚˇ ㄩㄢˋ
- Wade–Giles: Tsui^{4}-kao^{1} Fa^{3}-yüan^{4}
Hakka
- Pha̍k-fa-sṳ: Chui-kô Fap-yen
Southern Min
- Hokkien POJ: Chòe-ko Hoat-īⁿ
- Tâi-lô: Chuè-ko Huat-īnn

The Supreme Court (Chinese: 最高法院; pinyin: Zuìgāo Fǎyuàn; Pe̍h-ōe-jī: Chòe-ko Hoat-īⁿ) is the court of last resort for civil and criminal cases in the Republic of China. It is one of the three final courts in the Judicial Yuan.

Apart from the Supreme Court, the Supreme Administrative Court (最高行政法院) is the final court for administrative litigation, while the Disciplinary Court (惩戒法院) is the final court for misconduct by public officials.

== History ==
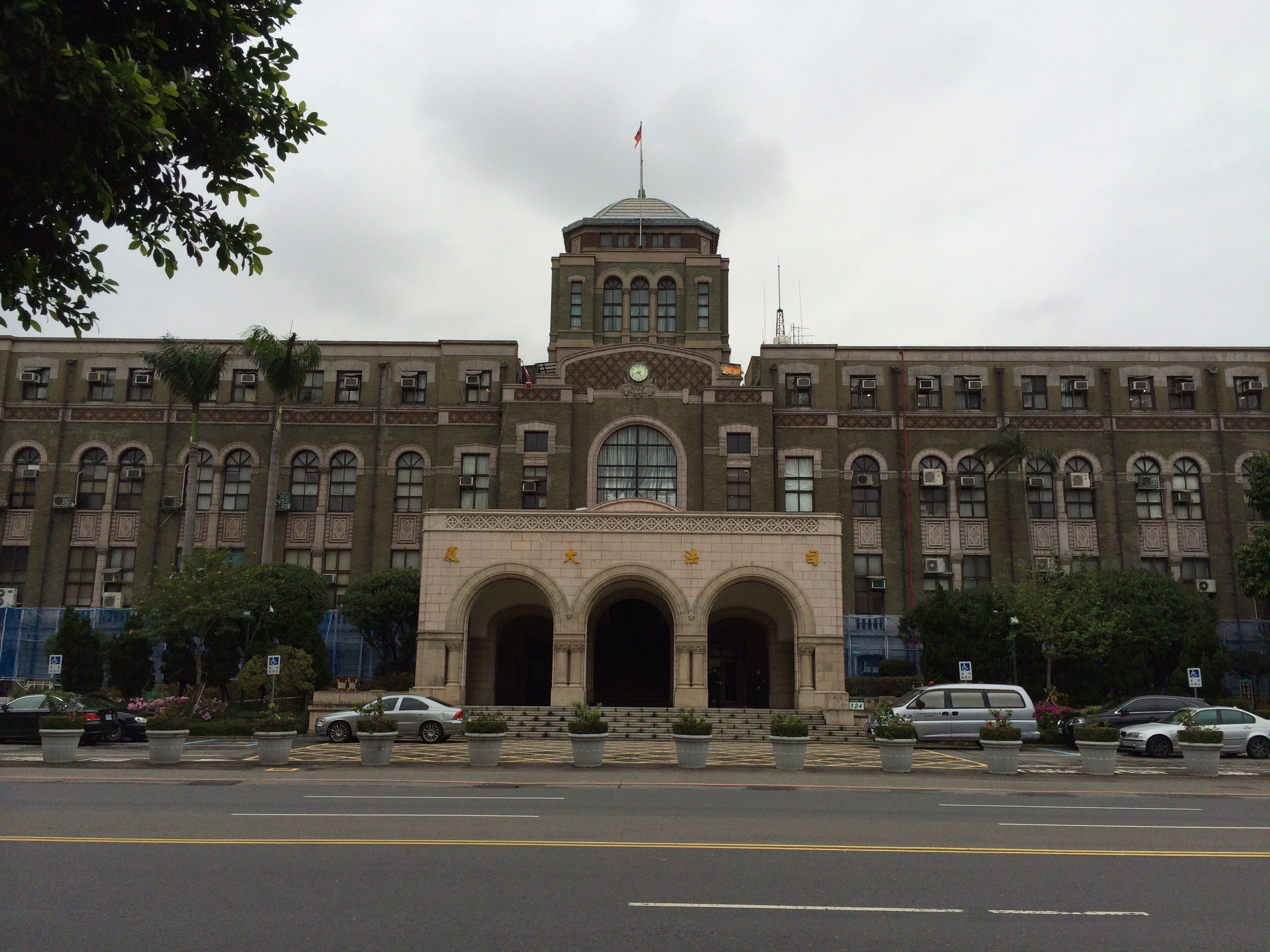
Supreme Court of the Republic of China at Judicial Building (1949-1992)

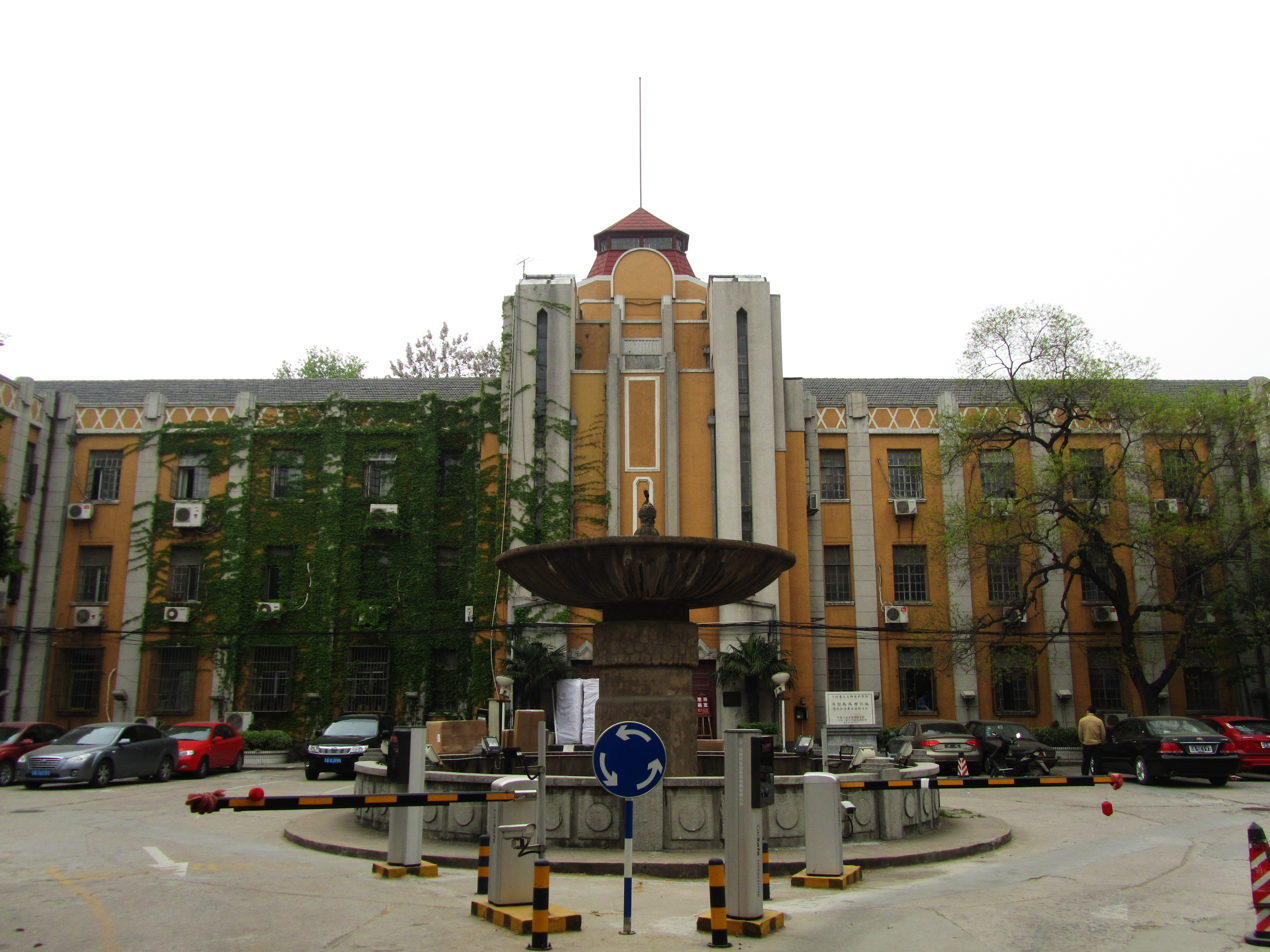
Former Supreme Court of the Republic of China in Nanjing.

The court in Taiwan (Formosa) was originally established in 1896, the second year after Taiwan became a part of Japan. The Taiwan High Court in this era can be considered the de facto supreme court in Taiwan, because cases cannot be further appealed to the Supreme Court in Tokyo. After World War II, Japan gave up its sovereignty on Taiwan, and the Supreme Court in the Republic of China government became the highest court of Taiwan's judicial system.

The Supreme Court of the Republic of China was originally established as the Ta Li Yuan (Chinese: 大理院; pinyin: Dàlǐ Yuàn) of the Qing Empire in 1909. The government of the Republic of China renamed the Ta Li Yuan to the Supreme Court in 1927 and made the Court the nation's court of last resort in 1928. In March 1949, the Court was moved to Canton with the Judicial Yuan. Shortly after in August 1949, the Court was moved to Taipei, Taiwan, where the Kuomintang government retreated after the Chinese Civil War.

Originally it was located at Judicial Building at Chung-king South Road, but it was later moved to its current location on Chang-sha Street since 1992.

== Introduction ==
The Court Organization Act states that the judicial system shall be composed of the Supreme Court, High Courts, and District Courts, in which the system of “three-level and three-instance” is used. The Supreme Court is the final appellate court for civil and criminal cases, except for civil cases involving amounts not exceeding NT $1,500,000 and petty offences enumerated in Article 376 of the Code of Criminal Procedure.

More specifically, the Court exercises jurisdiction over the following cases:

1. appeals from judgments of High Courts or their branches as courts of first instance in criminal cases;
2. appeals from judgments of High Courts or their branches as courts of second instance in civil and criminal cases;
3. appeals from rulings of High Courts or their branches;
4. appeals from judgments or rulings rendered by the civil court of second instance by the summary procedure, the amounts in controversy exceeding NT $1,500,000, and with permission granted in accordance with specified provisions;
5. civil and criminal retrials within the jurisdiction of the court of third instance;
6. extraordinary appeals; or
7. any other case as specified by laws.

The Supreme Court of Taiwan consists of several chambers. Currently there are nine criminal chambers and nine civil chambers, each composed of five judges. Cases are distributed to chambers by random. The Supreme Court also convenes the "Civil Grand Chamber" and "Criminal Grand Chamber", to which potential contradicting Supreme Court decisions are submitted in order to unify statute and regulation interpretations.

== Procedure ==
The Supreme Court is a court of cassation, which decides only issues of law, and must base its decision on the facts ascertained in the judgment of the court of second instance (High Court). An appeal is accepted only on the grounds that the original judgment is in violation of laws; appeals would be briefly rejected if the appellant merely argues about facts and interpretation of evidence. Typically there would be no hearings due to the fact that the Court does not deal with evidence related procedures such as cross-examination, but may still be convened if deemed necessary such as debates in law or psychological evaluation of the defendant for potential death sentence.

Once a case is brought to the Supreme Court and passed the check for brief dismissal, it will be assigned to a chamber. Cases before the Supreme Court are heard and decided by a panel of five judges, including a chief judge. If the chamber finds the case to be in violation of the law, the case would be reversed, and remanded to an inferior court if flaws exist in evidence acquisition or interpretation, or resentenced if the violation is simply a legal procedure error and there are no controversies upon the facts and evidence.

The Chief Justice of the Supreme Court is the highest ranking member of the court, and is appointed by the President. The Chief Justice is in charge of the administrative affairs of the entire court and also performs regular judge duty.

== Chief Justice ==
- Xu Yuangao (5 November 1927 – 13 November 1928)
- Lin Xiang (13 November 1928 – 5 November 1932)
- Ju Zheng (5 November 1932 – 22 July 1935)
- Jiao Yitang (22 July 1935 – 26 September 1940)
- Li Ba (30 January 1941 – 3 February 1945)
- Xia Qin (3 February 1945 – 13 July 1948)

=== Post 1947 Constitution ===
- Xie Yingzhou(13 July 1948－1966)
- Zha Liangjian(1966－1968)
- Chen Pu-sheng(1968－1972)
- Chien Kuo-cheng(1972－1987)
- Chu Chien-hung(1987－1993)
- Wang Chia-yi(1993－1996)
- Ge Yi-tsai(1996－1998)
- Lin Ming-te(1998－2001)
- Wu Chi-pin(2001－2007)
- Yang Jen-shou(2007－2012)
- Yang Ting-chang(2012－2015)
- Cheng Yu-shan (2015－2020)
- Wu Can (2020－2023)
- Kao Meng-hsun (2023–present)

== See also ==
- History of law in Taiwan
- Law of Taiwan
- Six Codes
- Constitution of the Republic of China
- Judicial Yuan
- High Court (Taiwan)
- District Courts (Taiwan)
- Ministry of Justice (Taiwan)
- Supreme Prosecutors Office
- Taiwan High Prosecutors Office
- List of law schools in Taiwan
