= Kao Meng-hsun =

Taiwanese judge

- 高孟焄

Chief Justice of the Supreme Court of the Republic of China
- Incumbent
- Assumed office 1 June 2023
- Appointed by: Hsu Tsong-li
- Preceded by: Wu Can

Personal details
- Born: 1959 (age 66–67)
- Education: National Taiwan University (LLB)

Kao Meng-hsun (Chinese: 高孟焄; born 1959) is a Taiwanese judge who has been the Chief Justice of the Supreme Court of Taiwan since 1 June 2023. She is the first woman to hold the role.

== Life and career ==
Kao Meng-hsun was born in 1959 and graduated from the Law Department of the National Taiwan University and worked as a judicial officer. She became a trial judge when she was 24 years old, serving on the Taoyuan District Court, New Taipei District Court and Taiwan High Court.

Kao was appointed as a judge of the Supreme Court in 2007, and was president of the Second Civil Court. On 1 June 2023, she was appointed as Chief Justice by Judicial Yuan President Hsu Tsong-li, after Wu Can retired upon turning 70. She is the first woman in the position and was appointed 56 years after Chang Chin-lan was the first woman appointed to the court.
