= Wukou Village Liou Family Ancestral Hall =

Ancestral shrine in Wanluan, Pingtung County, Taiwan

- 五溝水劉氏宗祠
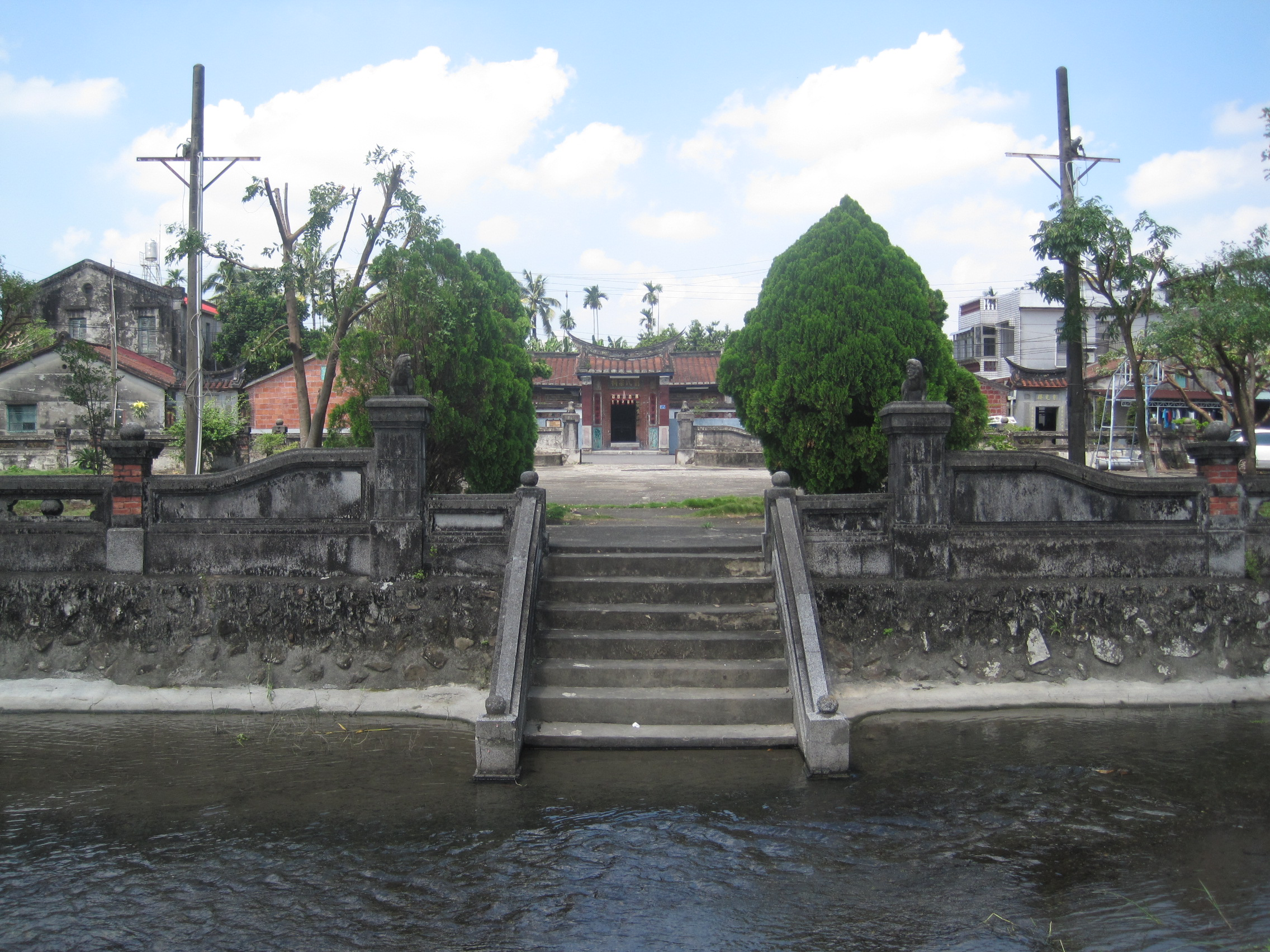
- Interactive map of the Wukou Village Liou Family Ancestral Hall area

General information
- Type: ancestral shrine
- Location: Wanluan, Pingtung County, Taiwan
- Coordinates: 22°35′29.9″N 120°35′42.7″E
- Completed: 1864

Technical details
- Floor area: 1 hectare

The Wukou Village Liou Family Ancestral Hall (traditional Chinese: 五溝水劉氏宗祠; simplified Chinese: 五沟水刘氏宗祠; pinyin: Wǔgōu Shuǐ Liú Shì Zōngcí) is an ancestral shrine in Wanluan Township, Pingtung County, Taiwan.

== Architecture ==
The Hakka-style hall spans over an area of one hectare. It was built with two internal wings, two external wings and Baroque-style walls. Most of the building material were brought from Guangdong. There are two lion stones placed in front of the main entrance.

== See also ==
- Chinese ancestral veneration
- Chaolin Temple
- Donglong Temple
- Checheng Fuan Temple
- Three Mountains King Temple
- List of temples in Taiwan
- List of tourist attractions in Taiwan
