= Princess Babao Temple =

Temple in Pingtung County, Taiwan

- 八寶公主廟
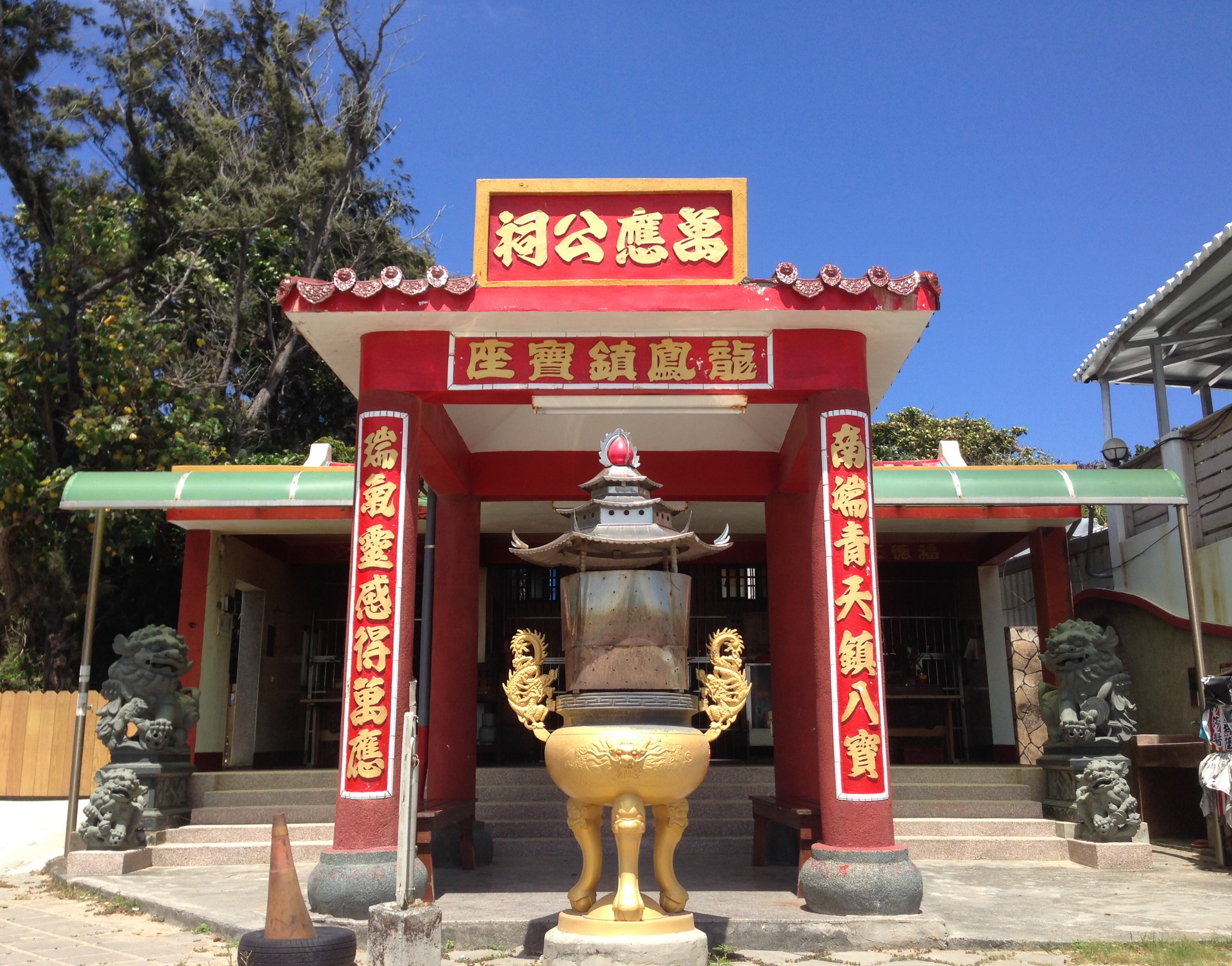

- Location within Taiwan

Religion
- Affiliation: Taoism
- Deity: Wanyinggong, Princess Babao, Tudigong

Location
- Location: Hengchun, Pingtung County
- Country: Taiwan
- Interactive map of Princess Babao Temple
- Coordinates: 21.9425°N 120.7988°E

Architecture
- Direction of façade: West

Wanyinggong Temple (Chinese: 萬應公祠; pinyin: Wànyìnggōng Xì), commonly referred to as Princess Babao Temple (Chinese: 八寶公主廟; pinyin: Bābǎo Gōngzhǔ Miào), is a yin miao (temple to deceased people) in Hengchun Township, Pingtung County, Taiwan. The temple is known for its worship of an allegedly Dutch princess known as "Princess Babao".

== Princess Babao ==
According to legend, a Dutch ship wrecked off the coast of Hengchun, and all the men were killed by a tribe of indigenous people living in nearby Guizijiao (龜仔角, now Sheding 社頂). The indigenous people typically did not kill women, but afterwards, a woman named Margaret was killed by a lone tribesman, who either did so deliberately or mistook her gender. The tribesman took eight items off of Margaret: a pair of klompen, a silk scarf, a pearl necklace, a ring with gemstones, a leather suitcase, earrings, a feather pen, and paper; these eight items were later known as babao (literally "eight treasures").

Historians have noted the similarities of the Princess Babao legend with that of Mercy G. Hunt, who was the wife of the captain of the USS Rover Joseph Hunt. The Rover shipwrecked in Taiwan in 1867, and its crew, including Mercy, were killed by indigenous people.

== History ==
In 1931, a local resident found some human remains on the beach, which they placed in an urn and put it into the local yin miao. Over the next three years, the region was plagued with misfortune, so residents hired a tongji, who said that the remains belong to a White woman whose spirit is wandering around causing trouble, and a third of the temple's space should be allotted to her for her spirit to settle down.

In 1961, the temple was rebuilt, and a smaller separate temple was given to the White woman's spirit. When the temple was completed, another tongji from Sheding claimed that the White woman was Princess Babao from local legends, and the remains were worshipped as such ever since. In 1981, the temple was rebuilt again, and this time Princess Babao was given one of the side altars within the temple. A wooden piece from a shipwreck was placed next to the temple as well.

In July 2008, an elderly woman from Sheding got lost. When she was found, she said that a female spirit abducted her. A tongji said that the spirit was Princess Babao, who intends on taking ten lives. In September, the community held a seven-day ritual to try to appease Princess Babao.

On March 28, 2016, the wood was set on fire. The police inferred that the fire was due to incense stuck into the wood's cracks during worship, and the temple decided to continue displaying the charred wood in its original spot.

== Architecture ==
Princess Babao Temple is located next to a beach in Kenting National Park. The small temple is divided into three halls: Wanyinggong (unnamed deceased souls) has an altar in the middle, while Princess Babao and Tudigong has an altar on each side. A portrait of a White woman hangs above Princess Babao's altar, and worshipers typically present coffee and red wine to Princess Babao.

== See also ==
- Chinese ancestral veneration
- Chaolin Temple
- Donglong Temple
- Checheng Fuan Temple
- Three Mountains King Temple
- List of temples in Taiwan
