= Ong Yah =

Deities in Hokkien folk religion

Ong Yah (Chinese: 王爺; Pe̍h-ōe-jī: Ông-iâ; lit. 'Royal Lord') are deities in Hokkien folk religion in Fujian and Taiwan, frequently considered an aspect of the Taoist belief system. Ong Yah is particularly worshipped in Southern Taiwan and also among Hoklo communities worldwide.

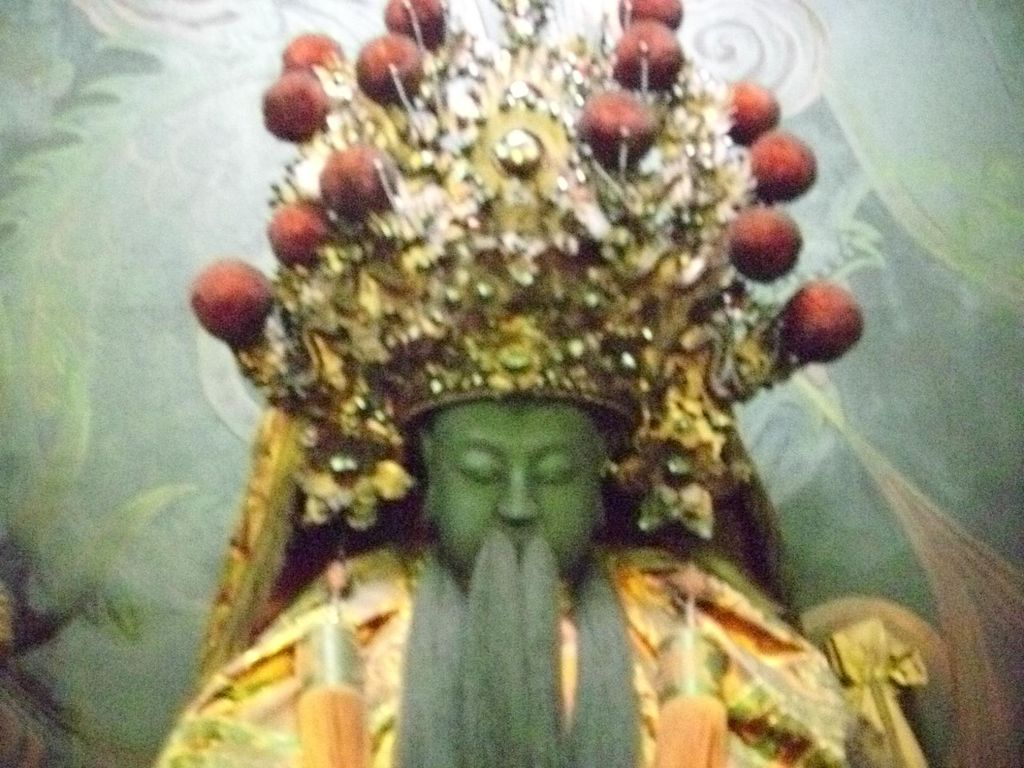
Prince Su Hu.

The customary belief is that Ong Yah are Divine Emissaries who tour the world of the living on behalf of the Celestial Imperial Order, expelling disease and evil from those who worship and seek their divine grace. A temple dedicated to Ong Yah is usually called Tāi-thian-hú (代天府; "Palace representing (the son of) Heaven"), and the Ong Yah's visit is known as Tāi-thian-sûn-siú (代天巡狩), the object of the "inspection" being disease and bad luck. Such "inspection tours" take place on a regular cycle of a set number of years, usually three years but may varies at different region.

== Origins of Ong Yah worship ==
Ong Yah worship stems from belief in two main categories of supernatural beings, both of which are spirits of what were once, according to legend, real human beings with selfless attitude and noble character.

The first category of Ong Yah belief began with the legend of a kind-hearted intellectual who sacrificed himself by committing suicide in a well that contained toxic water, in order to prevent the villagers from drinking the well water and thus avoided any pestilence or plague from spreading. Therefore, to stop diseases, like pestilence, from spreading, people would honoured and make offerings to those beings who sacrificed their own lives for the civilians and public well-being. As time passed by, these great people are honored as Ong Yah and gradually became local Guardian Deities that are able to dispelling epidemic and diseases, and bestow blessings and good fortune.

The second category comprises national heroes who are bestowed with the status of Deity by the Celestial appointment of Jade Emperor due to their heroic deeds and great sacrifices in their lives. An example is the spirit of Koxinga, thus honored for his role in defending and protecting Han Chinese against the Qing invading forces in China and the Dutch colonial forces in Taiwan.

== The Ong Yah ==
There are many Ong Yah: some traditions claim there are a total of 360, with 132 surnames among them.

== Ong Yah festivals ==
Ong Chun/Wangchuan/Wangkang ceremony, rituals and related practices for maintaining the sustainable connection between man and the ocean
- UNESCO Intangible Cultural Heritage
- Country: China, Malaysia
- Reference: 1608
- Region: Asia and the Pacific

Inscription history
- Inscription: 2020

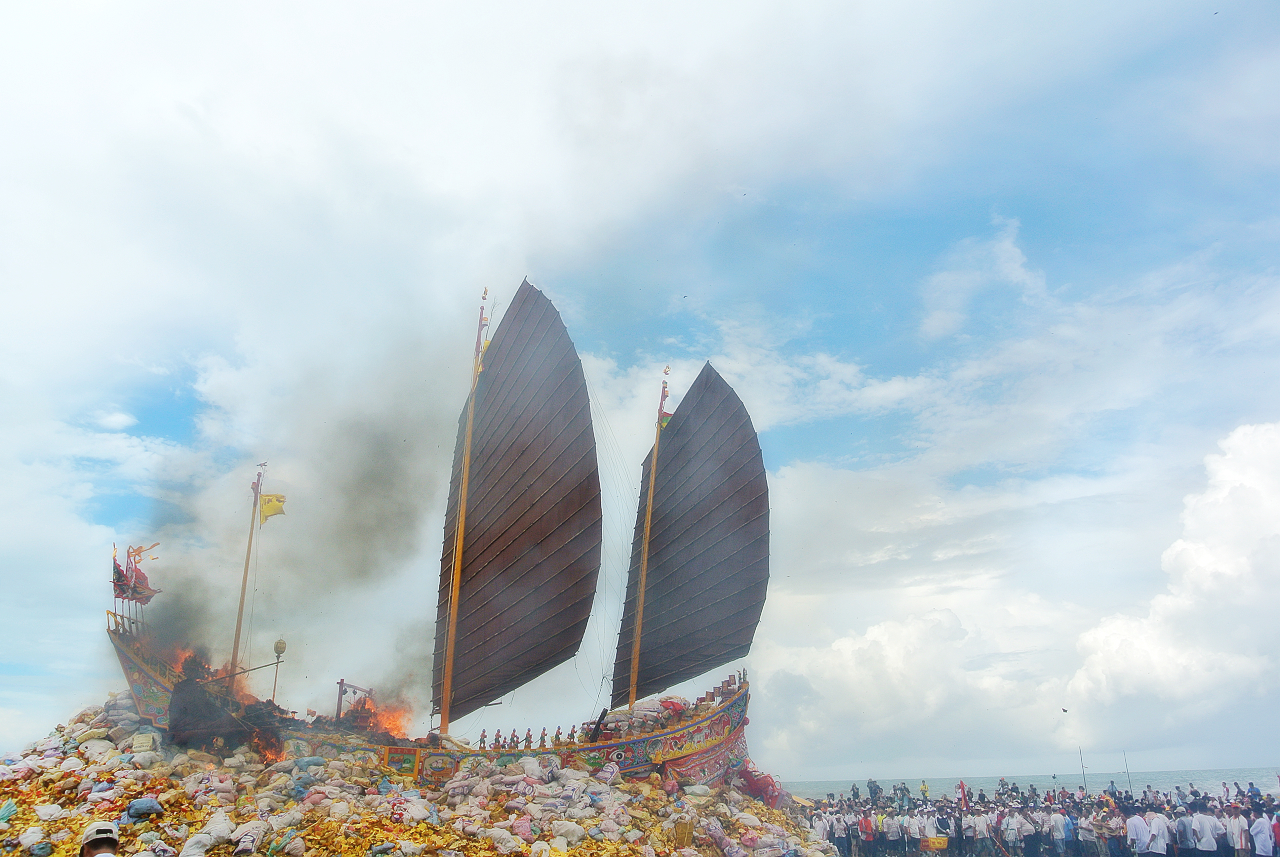
Burning of the Ong Yah boat in Qieding, Taiwan

Ong Yah festivals are grand religious celebrations that take place in various parts of Taiwan, mostly in the south. They generally involve processions of Deities throughout the region to inspect and ward off any deadly diseases and evil presence, while bestow blessings with good fortune for the inhabitants in the particular region, and the celebration will complete with the burning or launch of a replica boat to send off the "Divine Emissaries" to heaven.

One of the grandest Ong Yah's festivals in Taiwan is the Donggang King Boat Festival, which takes place in Donglong Temple which is located in the city of Donggang, Pingtung County, once every three years. The 2009 festival began on October 10 and culminated in the early morning of October 17, when a wooden boat would be processed in the area and sent off while set on fire on the beach indicating the Deities heading back to the Heaven.

The Nankunshen Daitian Temple, considered one of the Ong Yah's founding temple, was built in 1817 and is located in Beimen, Tainan.
