= Bombing of Master Handan Festival =

Folk ritual held during the Lantern Festival of Taitung, Taiwan

Lord Handan Festival 炸邯鄲
- Dates: 15th and 16th days of the 1st lunisolar month
- Frequency: Annual
- Location: Taitung County
- Country: Taiwan

The Bombing of Master Handan Festival (Chinese: 炸邯鄲) is a folk ritual that is usually held annually on the 15th and 16th days of the first lunisolar month after the Lantern Festival in Taitung County, Taiwan.

It has been recorded that the residents of Taitung have voluntarily acted as targets for firecrackers since the Japanese colonial era, although the stories behind the ritual's origins remain uncertain.

According to some cultural historians, "Lord Handan" is the Martial God of Wealth who intensely disliked the cold. During the festival, a chosen individual recruited by Taitung's Hsuanwu Temple would portray Lord Handan by wearing only red shorts, a gold headband, earplugs in his ears, and a wet yellow cloth covering his face and mouth to prevent him from choking in the smoke. The individual would hold a banyan tree branch in his right hand and stand to have firecrackers thrown at him by the crowd as the procession moves through Taitung's streets to drive the cold away from his body. The festival is said to be able to expel malevolent spirits and bring prosperity. It was believed that the more firecrackers were set off, the greater the success and wealth that would be bestowed upon the devotees.

According to another tradition, Lord Handan was worshipped as a deity by gangster members and outlaws, who used firecrackers to demonstrate their strength. In the 1970s and 1980s, local gang bosses often took on the role of Handan, where the custom of bombarding Handan with firecrackers evolved into a rivalry between leaders of warring factions, intended to determine the true boss. The person who could withstand the barrage of firecrackers the longest was expected to assume the position of the organization's new leader. However, due to these practices, the ritual was banned by the Taitung police in 1984, and local gang leaders were arrested and imprisoned as part of a crackdown on organized crime groups. The festival was only revived in 1989.

During the COVID-19 pandemic in Taiwan in 2021 and 2022, the festival was canceled as a preventive measure against the spread of the coronavirus.

== Gallery ==
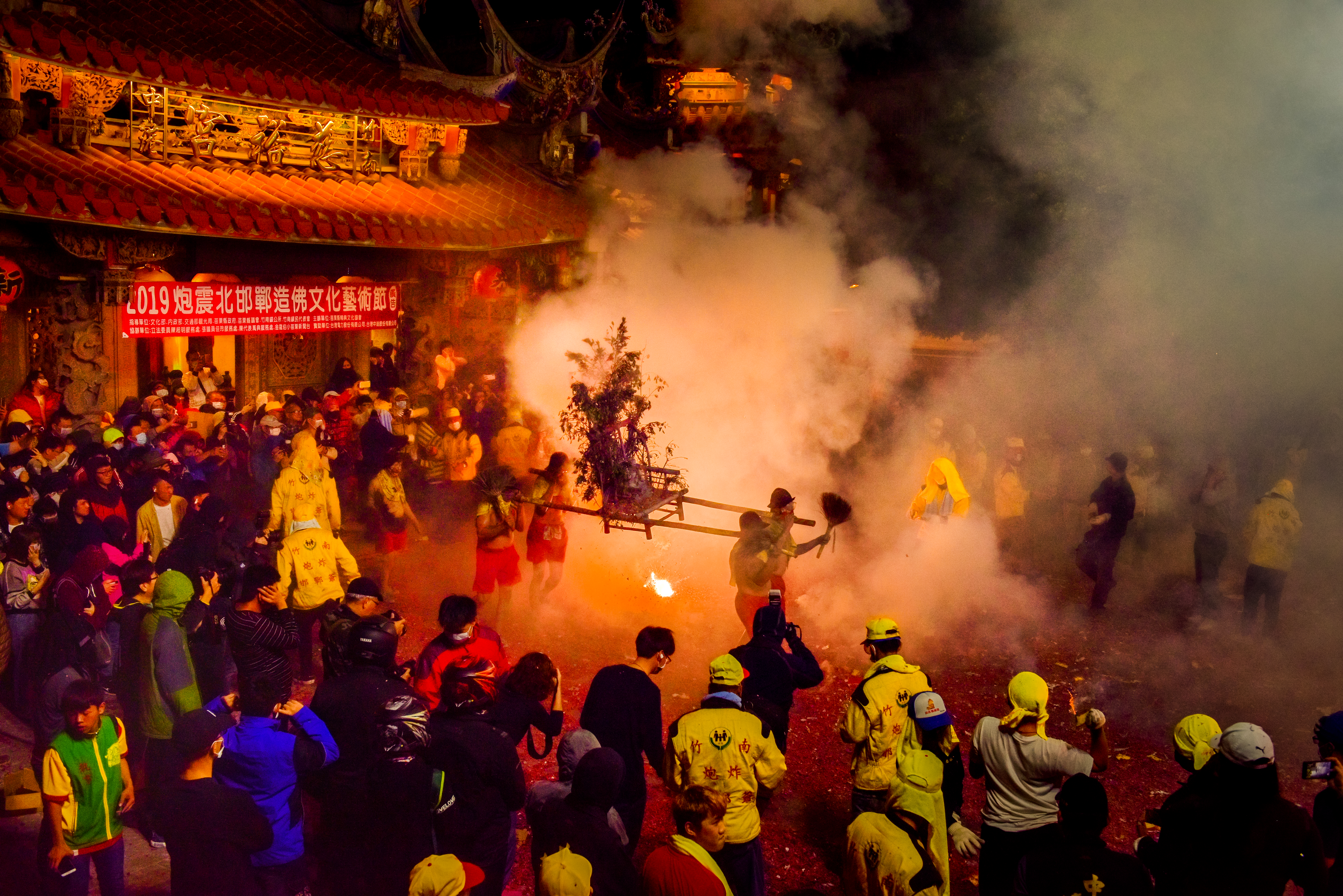

== See also ==
- List of festivals in Taiwan
