= Donggang King Boat Festival =

Cultural festival in Donggang, Pingtung, Taiwan

Donggang King Boat Festival 東港迎王平安祭典
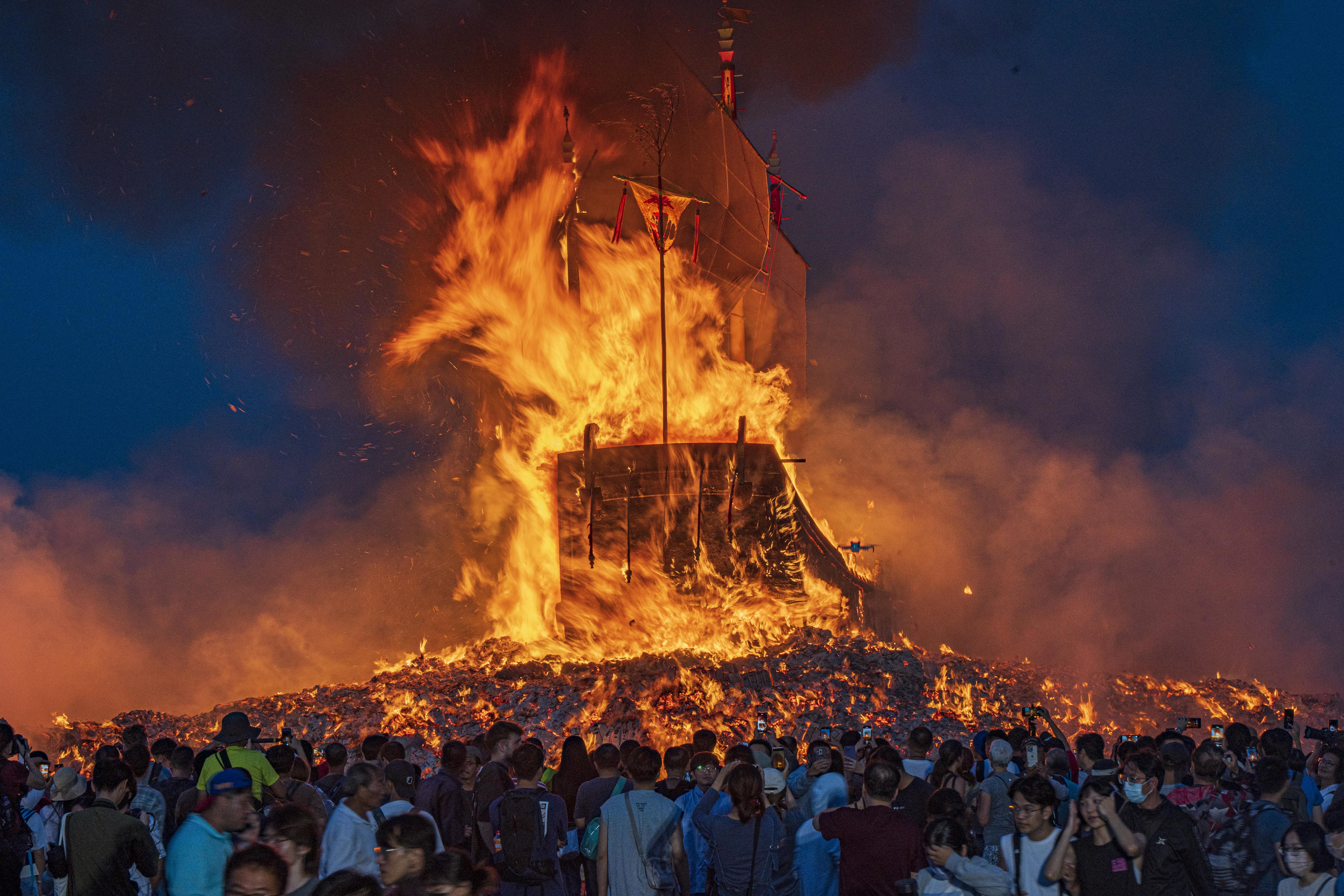
- Burning of the king boat during the festival in 2024
- Frequency: Every third Autumn
- Locations: Donggang Township, Pingtung County, Taiwan

The Donggang King Boat Festival, (Chinese: 東港迎王平安祭典; Tongyong Pinyin: Dōnggǎng Yíng Wáng Píng'ān Jìdiǎn; Tâi-lô: Tang-káng ngiâ-ông pîng-an tsè-tián) also known as the Wang Ye Boat Festival, is a triennial religious festival held in Donggang Township, Pingtung County, Taiwan. The festival centers on rituals honoring the Ong Yah (王爺), a group of deities associated in folk religion with driving away disease and misfortune.

The event typically lasts about a week and culminates in the ceremonial burning of a large wooden vessel known as the "king boat", which symbolically carries the Ong Yah and accumulated impurities away from the community. The festival is organized primarily by Donglong Temple (東隆宮) and is regarded as one of the most significant religious events in southern Taiwan. It involves extensive participation by local residents, including volunteers who assist with preparations, processions, and ritual performances.

== History ==
The Donggang King Boat Festival has been held for several centuries and is usually organized once every three years. The exact dates are determined through ritual divination conducted at Donglong Temple. Similar Wangye rituals exist in other parts of Taiwan but the Donggang festival is known for its elaborate ceremonies and the construction and burning of a full-sized ceremonial boat. The worship of the Ong Yah deities is intended to protect communities from epidemics and malevolent spirits. Some scholars believe that the discovery that fire can effectively kill pathogens may be one of the sources of inspiration for this custom, which may have been around for 1,000 years.

== Festival rituals ==
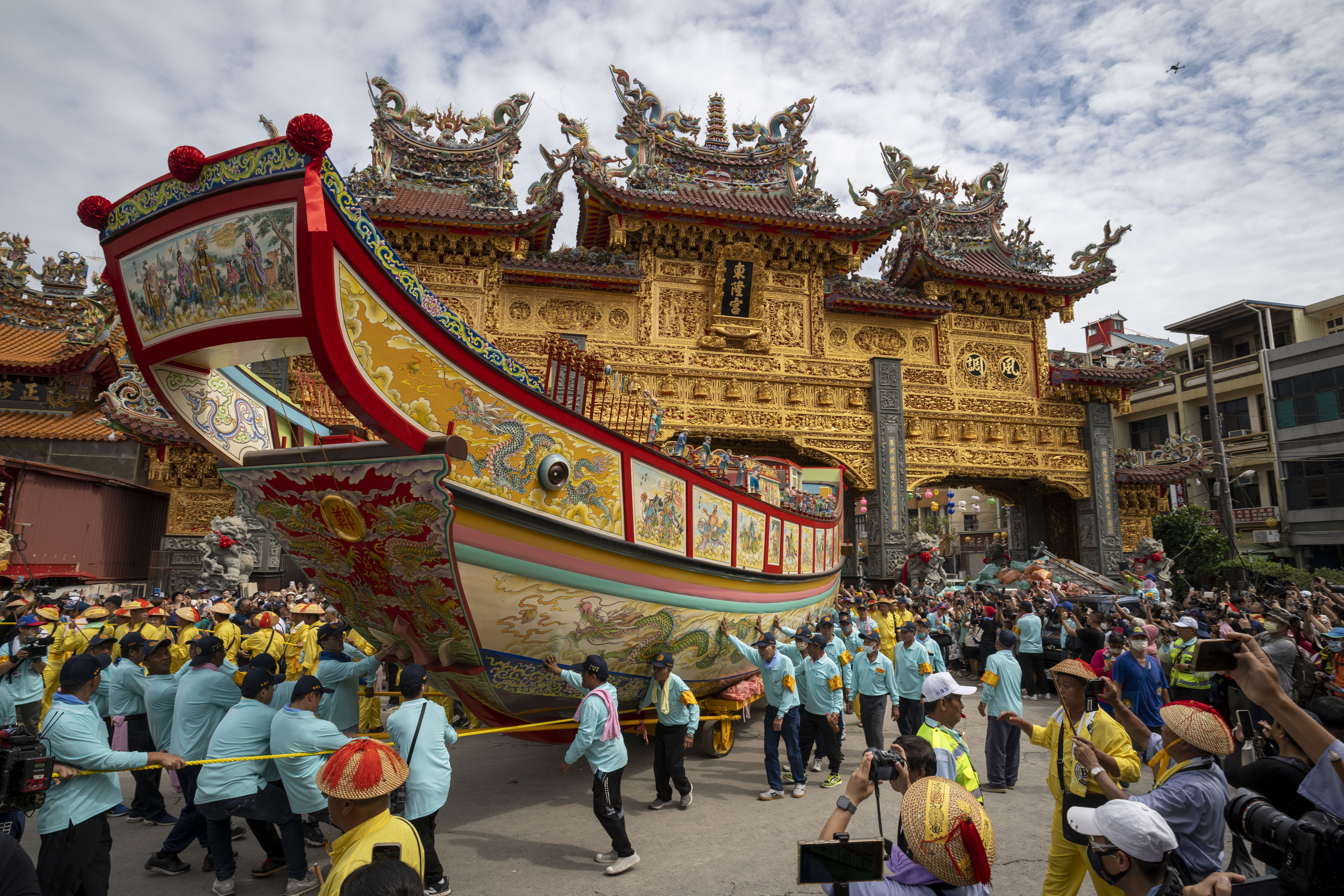
During the festival, processions carrying palanquins with deity statues travel through the streets of Donggang.

The festival typically lasts eight days and includes a sequence of religious rites, temple ceremonies, and community processions. The opening rituals involve inviting the Wangye deities to descend to the human world. Spirit mediums may enter trance states to communicate with the deities and identify the leading deity among them.

During the festival, processions carrying palanquins with deity statues travel through the streets of Donggang. Firecrackers are often set off by residents as the procession passes their homes. In a ritual sometimes described as "sailing on land", the king boat is also paraded through the town to symbolically collect illness and misfortune from the community. This was done by placing the "epidemic gods" (Chinese: 瘟神; Tongyong Pinyin: wēshén) on massive "plague boats" (Chinese: 瘟船; Tongyong Pinyin: wēnchúan) made of paper that were then burnt or floated away.

The festival ends with an all-night party, in which the Ong Yah is entertained with music, and the boat filled with counterfeit money. The final ceremony takes place before dawn on the last day, when the king boat is transported to the coast and burned. After offerings and prayers are made, the vessel is set alight on a large pile of joss paper. The burning symbolizes sending the Ong Yah deities back to the heavens and removing harmful influences from the community.

== King boat ==
A new king boat is constructed for each festival cycle specifically for the ritual burning. The vessel is typically built from wood using traditional shipbuilding techniques. The boats are elaborately decorated and may measure around 14 m (46 ft) in length and weigh several tons. They are equipped with detailed features such as carved dragon decorations, miniature cannons, and figurines representing sailors. The boat may also contain symbolic supplies, including paper money and offerings intended to accompany the deities on their return journey. Historically, the boat was made from wood, although at certain times alternative materials such as papier-mâché were used. In modern practice, wooden construction has largely returned in order to preserve traditional craftsmanship.

In 2024, the Cultural Department of Taiwan opened a The Pingtung King Boat Cultural Museum in the township of Donggang to preserve and share knowledge of the intangible cultural heritage and traditions related to the Donggang King Boat Festival. The museum features five stories of immersive exhibitions, including a models of the Donggang City God's Temple and a large scale replica model of the King Boat constructed by traditional craftsmen.

== See also ==
- Ong Yah
- Religion in Taiwan
- List of festivals in Taiwan
- Yanshui Beehive Fireworks Festival
- Pingxi Sky Lantern Festival
