= Three Mountains King Temple =

Temple in Jiuru, Pingtung County, Taiwan

- 九如三山國王廟
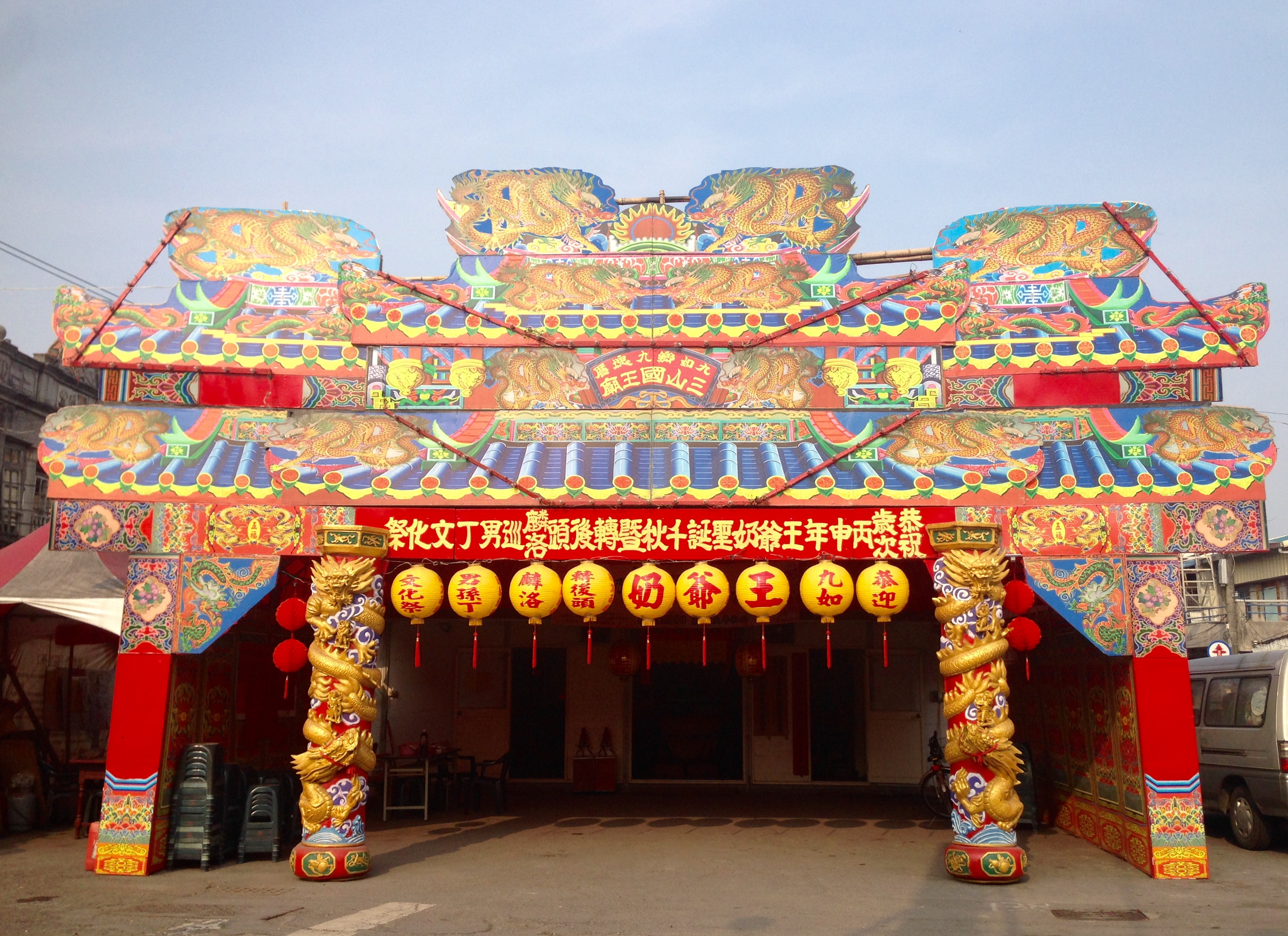

- Location within Pingtung County

Location
- Location: Jiuru, Pingtung County, Taiwan
- Interactive map of Three Mountains King Temple
- Coordinates: 22°43′50.6″N 120°29′4.9″E

Architecture
- Type: Chinese temple
- Style: Hakka
- Completed: 1651

The Three Mountains King Temple (traditional Chinese: 九如三山國王廟; simplified Chinese: 九如三山国王庙; pinyin: Jiǔrú Sānshān Guówáng Miào) is a temple in Jiuru Township, Pingtung County, Taiwan.

== Name ==
The Three Mountains part of the temple name refers to the three mountains in Mainland China, which are Mount Du, Mount Ming and Mount Jing.

== History ==
The temple was constructed in 1651 and is dedicated to Lords of the Three Mountains.

== Architecture ==
The temple is a traditional Hakka-style building listed as the 3rd category of historical building by the government. The roof of the temple is a tail-shaped structure divided into three sections. The temple building is divided into three prayer rooms and two wings.

== See also ==
- Chaolin Temple
- Donglong Temple
- Checheng Fuan Temple
- List of temples in Taiwan
- List of tourist attractions in Taiwan
