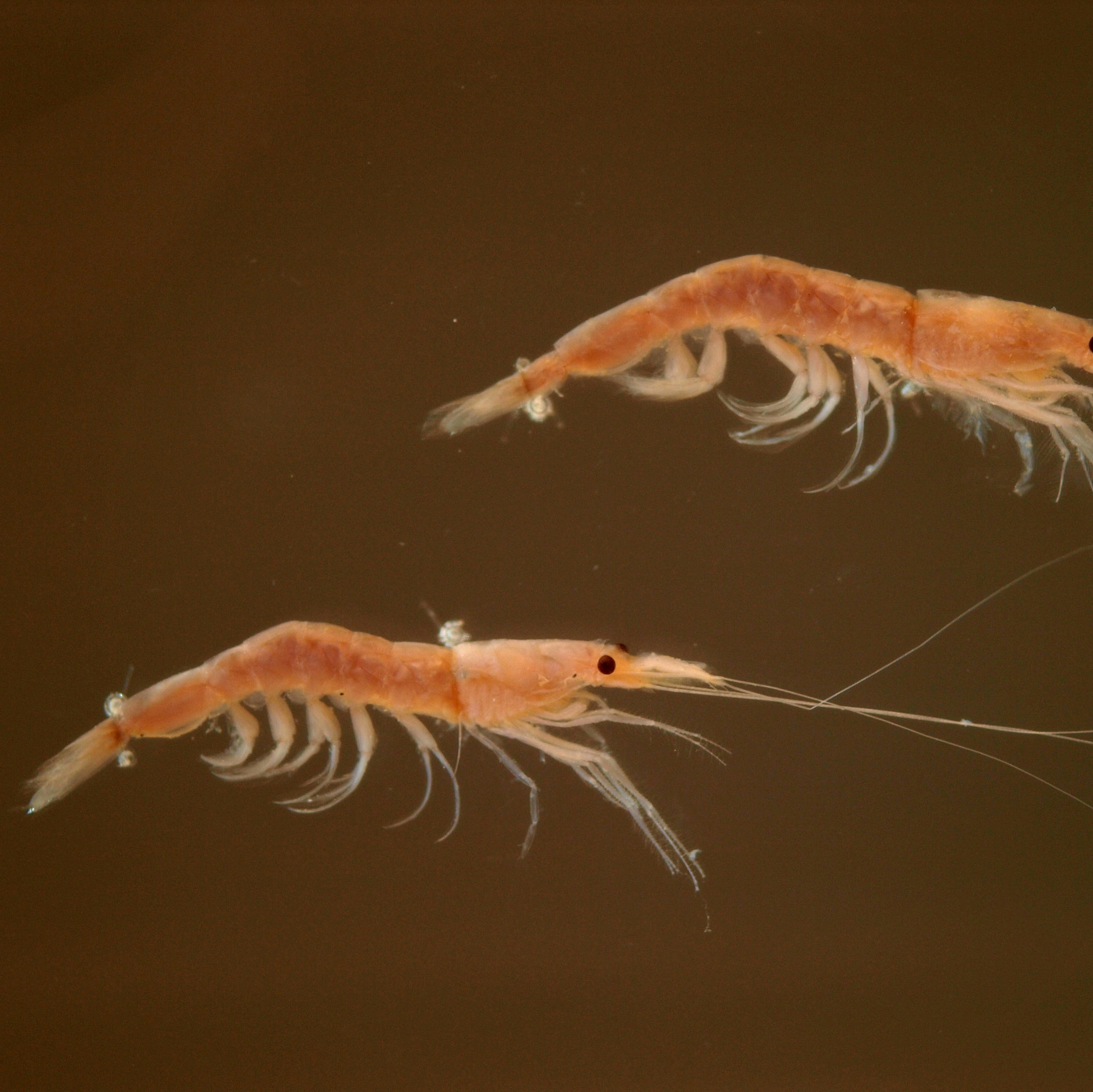

Scientific classification
- Kingdom: Animalia
- Phylum: Arthropoda
- Clade: Pancrustacea
- Class: Malacostraca
- Order: Decapoda
- Suborder: Dendrobranchiata
- Family: Sergestidae
- Genus: Lucensosergia
- Species: L. lucens

Binomial name
- Lucensosergia lucens (Hansen, 1922)

Synonyms
- Sergestes kishinouyei Nakazawa and Terao, 1915; Sergia lucens Hansen, 1922; Sergestes phosphoreus Kishinouye, 1925

= Sakura shrimp =

Species of crustacean

Lucensosergia lucens is a species of shrimp popularly known as the sakura shrimp or sakura ebi. The translucent pink shrimp derives its name from sakura, the Japanese word for cherry blossom trees. The species grows to about 4–5 cm and lives primarily in Suruga Bay in Shizuoka Prefecture, Japan, where it is caught to be eaten. It is also caught in Taiwan.

== Taxonomy ==
The species name of the sakura shrimp has not been settled. The International Code of Zoological Nomenclature uses the designation Sergia kishinouyei that Nakazawa and Terao gave it in 1915. Researchers tend to use the Sergia lucens, which Danish zoologist Hans Jacob Hansen gave it in 1922, especially since Isabella Gordon published a detailed account of the species in On New Or Imperfectly Known Species of Crustacea Macrura in 1935 using Hansen's designation. Hansen's designation comes from the genus Sergia and the Latin lucentis ("lighting"), likely referring to the sakura shrimp's phosphorescent photophores, which do emit light under certain conditions.

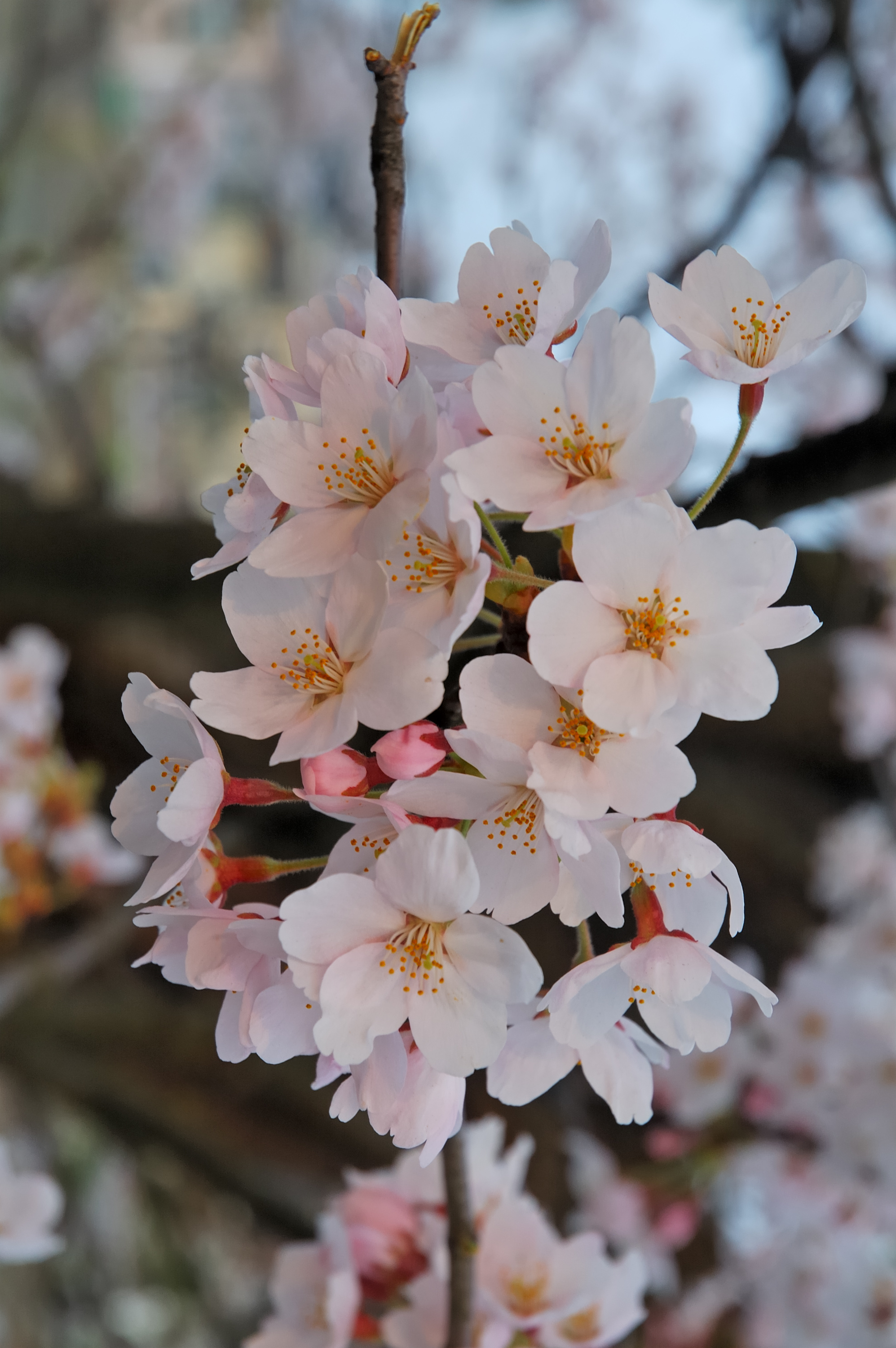
The name of the shrimp comes from its colour resembling the sakura cherry blossom.

The Japanese name sakura ebi (桜海老) translates as "cherry blossom shrimp"; it is so named because of the pink colour of the dried shrimp.

== Description ==
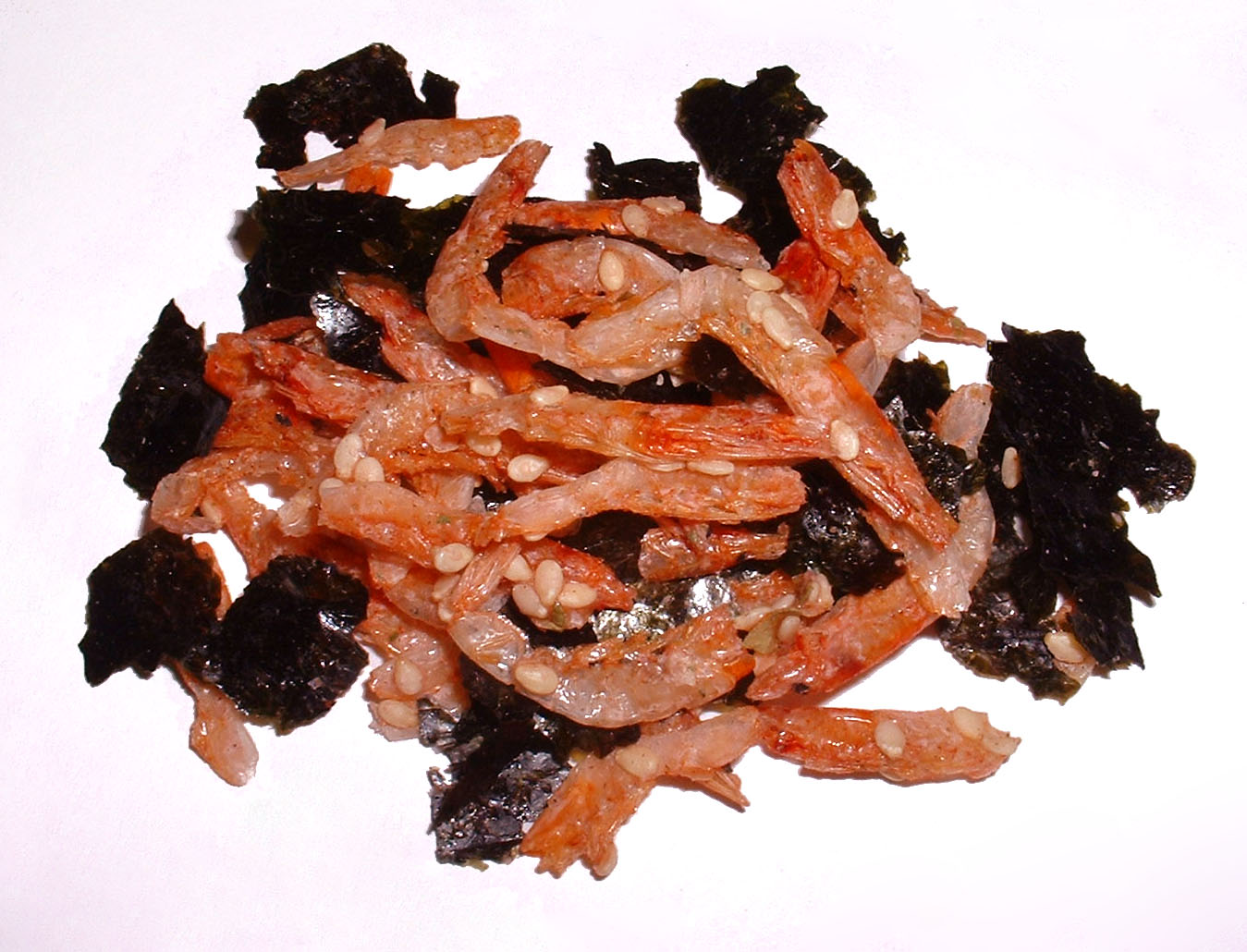
Dried sakura shrimp with nori and sesame

The sakura shrimp has a lifespan of about 15 months, matures a year after hatching, and dies off 2 or 3 months after spawning.

The adult can grow to 4–5 cm and 0.4 g. The body is near translucent, but red pigments are present all over the body, so that live specimens appear to be pink (sakura-iro) in color, and this is believed to be the reason the shrimp obtained its Japanese name. These pigments are concentrated in the lateral carapace, around the mouth and mouth appendage, and the tail (uropod and telson).

Most members of Sergestes normally emit light, but for a long time, the sakura shrimp had not been observed to luminesce, despite having photophores. (Note: The shrimp with Japanese common name "benisakura ebi" (S. prehensilis, syn. Prehensilosergia prehensilis, loosely referred to as sakura ebi in one study is reported to intermittently emit faint greenish-yellow light. Omori et al. discusses this as a S. lucens experiment.) However bioluminescence has been confirmed under laboratory conditions using strobe light or eyestalk-crushing as stimulus. The photophores, which appear as red spots, range in number from 158 to 169 in adults; it numbers fewer in immature specimens and increases as the individual grows.

Three pairs of head appendages are present: the second pair (the antennae) are the longest, and the third (mandible) the shortest. The first set of appendages (antennules) are quite short also, even shorter than the rostrum that are less than half the length of eye stalks.

As for thoractic appendages, there are five pairs of pereiopods present, the second and third pair being chelate, or pincer-ended, as is generally the case for this entire genus. The fourth and the much shorter fifth pereiopods are flat and consist of six-segmented, this also being a genus-wide trait.

=== Distribution ===
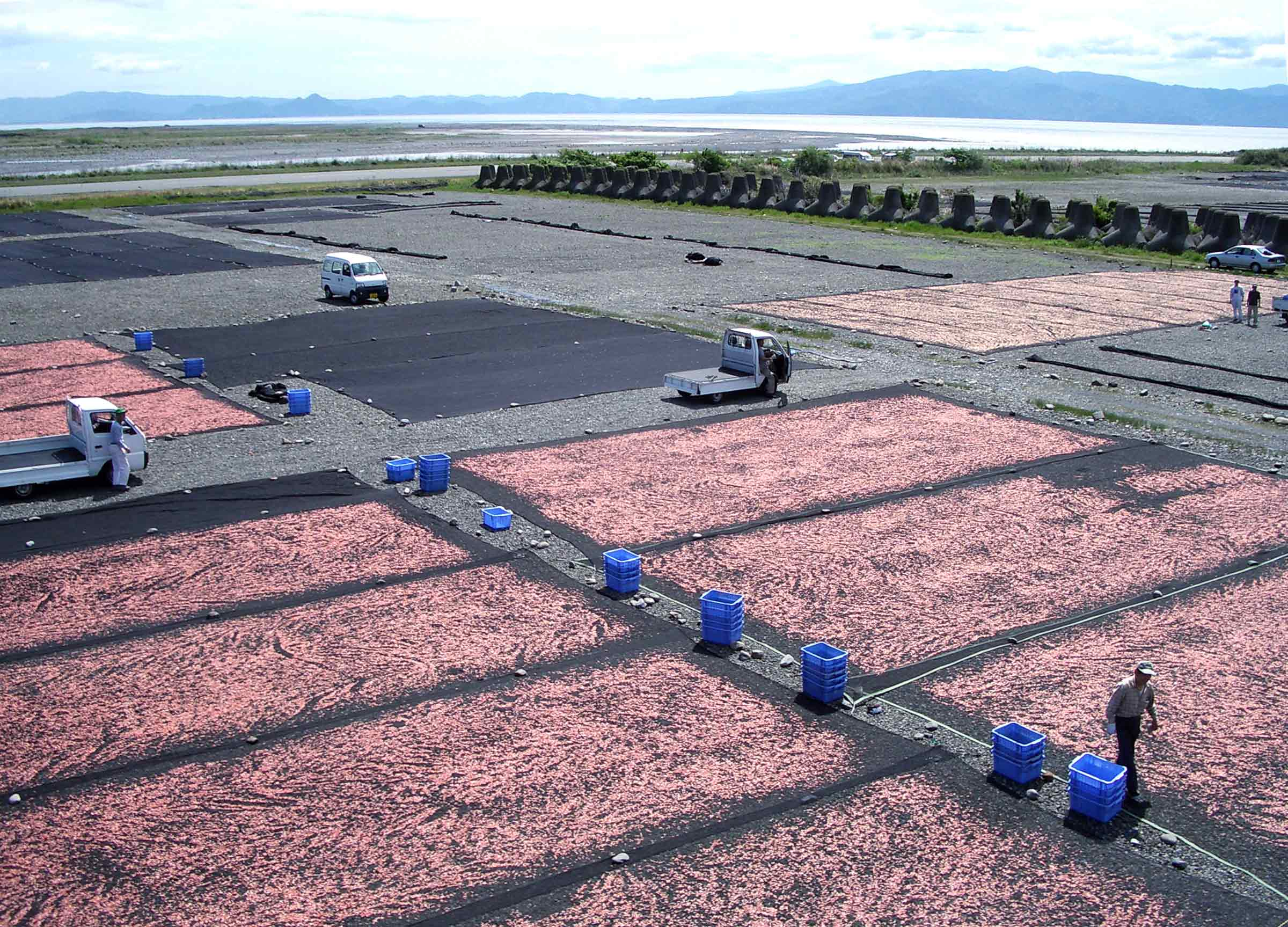
Sakura shrimp drying in Shizuoka Prefecture

The pelagic Sakura shrimp live in coastal areas, primarily in Suruga Bay in Shizuoka Prefecture, where they form in dense aggregations. Suruga measures about 60 km long and 54 km at its greatest width; at a depth of 2400 m, and with almost no continental shelf, it is the deepest and steepest of Japan's bays. Sakura shrimp remain in depths from 210 to 360m during the daytime.

Sakura shrimp are also found in nearby Sagami and Tokyo Bays, but are not caught there as the populations are too sparse, perhaps because of insufficient depths of the bays. In Taiwan the sakura shrimp is found in the coastal waters of Donggang and on the east coast. Findings have also been recorded in Borneo and New Guinea.

=== Behaviour ===
Rather than crawling on the ocean floor as with other species of shrimp, the sakura shrimp spends its life floating in the water. During the day sakura shrimp scatter at a depth of 200–300 m; toward dusk they aggregate at a depth of about 60 m.

Until maturity the ratio of males to females is about equal. Upon reaching maturity males and females separate into groups, and as the females tend to group near the surface close to shore, the sex ratio changes around May to July.

==== Spawning ====
Spawning occurs between late May and early November, but primarily in July and August when surface water temperatures are above 20 °C. The ovaries stretch below the heart from the gastric region to the end of the back. As they mature they grow and change colour from yellow to milky blue and finally bluish-green at the time of spawning. The sakura shrimp spawns an average of 1700–2300 eggs overnight far out in the bays. Distribution concentrates at a depth of about 20–50 m. The eggs average 2.6 mm in circumference. The eggs are not sticky, and with density similar to seawater they remain wafting, typically near the spot they were spawned, spending the course of their life as plankton.

== Harvest and consumption ==
Sakura shrimp (dried)
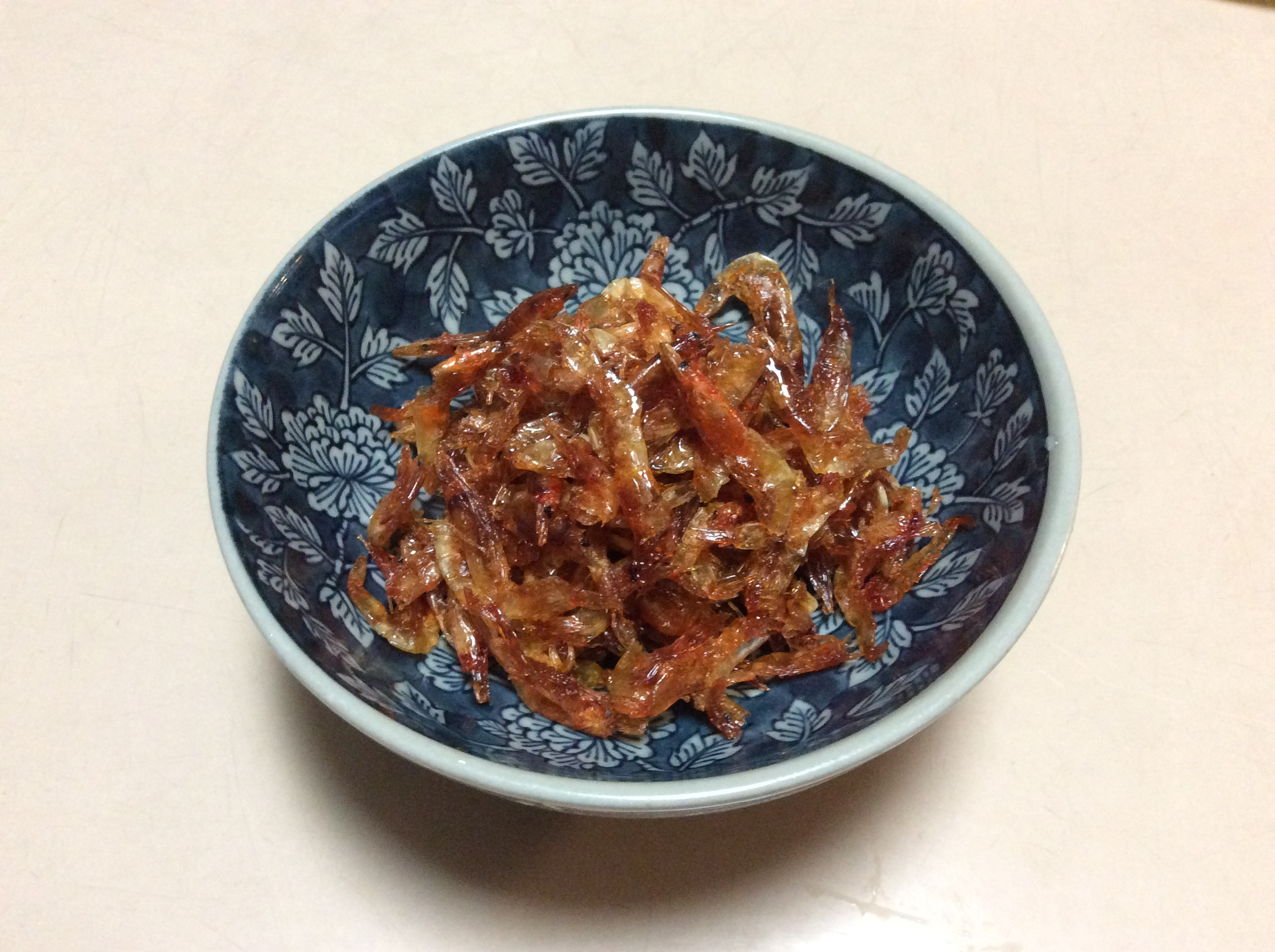
- Dried Sakura shrimp

Nutritional value per 100g
- Energy: 1,305 kJ (312 kcal)
- Carbohydrates: 0.1 g
- Dietary fibre: 0 g
- Fat: 4.0 g
- Saturated: 0.59 g
- Monounsaturated: 0.63 g
- Polyunsaturated: 0.75 g
- Protein: 64.9 g
Vitamins and minerals
Vitamins	Quantity %DV^{†}
Vitamin A equiv.	0% 0 μg
Thiamine (B1)	14% 0.17 mg
Riboflavin (B2)	12% 0.15 mg
Niacin (B3)	34% 5.5 mg
Pantothenic acid (B5)	23% 1.16 mg
Vitamin B6	12% 0.21 mg
Folate (B9)	58% 230 μg
Vitamin B12	458% 11.0 μg
Vitamin C	0% 0 mg
Vitamin D	0% 0 μg
Vitamin E	49% 7.3 mg
Vitamin K	0% 0 μg
Minerals	Quantity %DV^{†}
Calcium	154% 2000 mg
Copper	371% 3.34 mg
Iron	18% 3.2 mg
Magnesium	74% 310 mg
Manganese	10% 0.23 mg
Phosphorus	96% 1200 mg
Potassium	40% 1200 mg
Sodium	52% 1200 mg
Zinc	45% 4.9 mg
- Other constituents: Quantity
- Water: 19.4 g
- Colesterol: 700 mg
- ^{†}Percentages estimated using US recommendations for adults, except for potassium, which is estimated based on expert recommendation from the National Academies.

The Suruga fishery was established in 1894. During the two fishing periods of March to June and October to December the sakura shrimp are caught by trawling at night.

Annual yields of sakura shrimp average 2000 tons in Suruga Bay and 100 tons in Donggang. In Japan during the summer spawning months Sakura shrimp harvests are prohibited for conservation reasons.

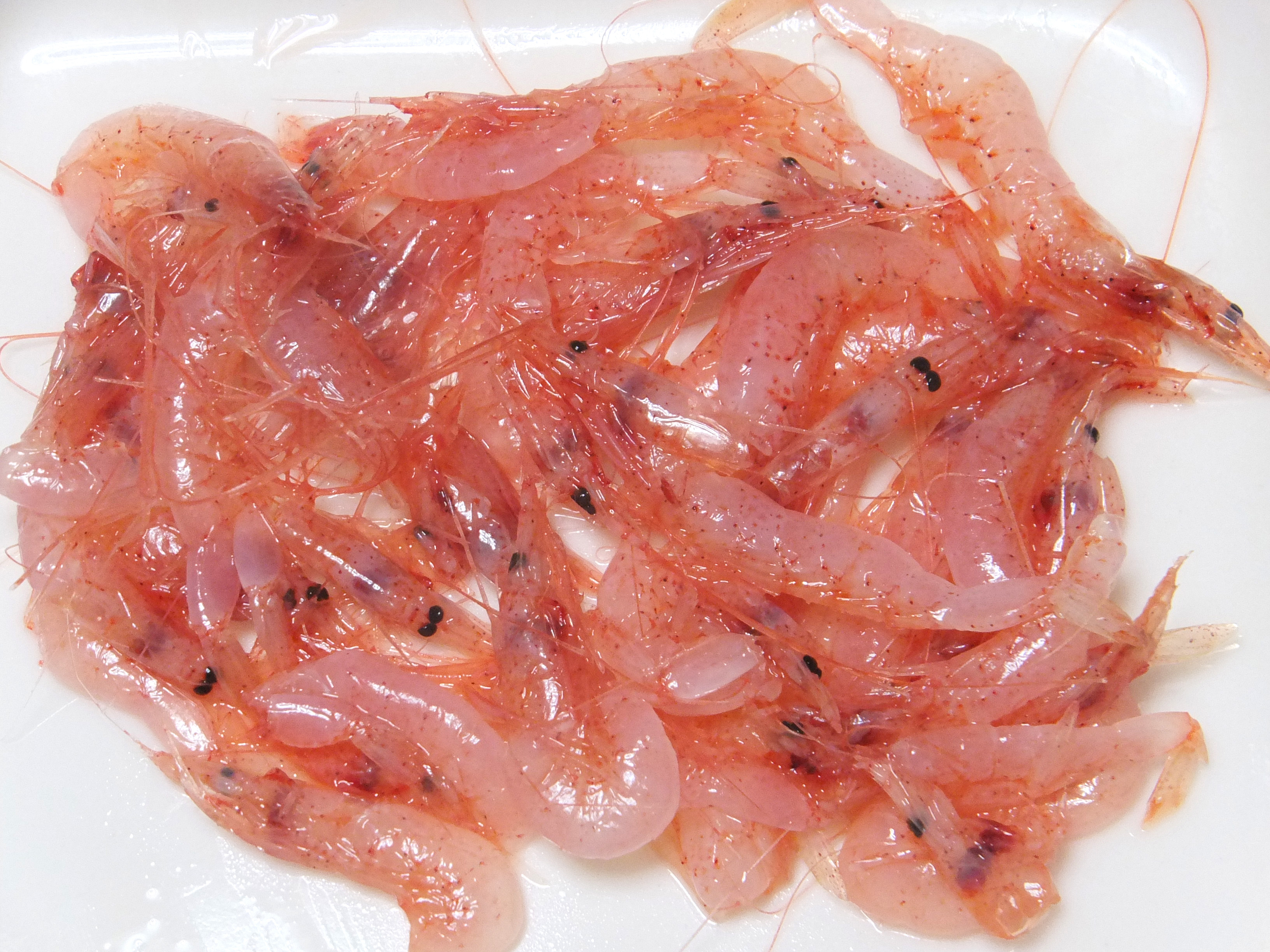
Raw sakura shrimp

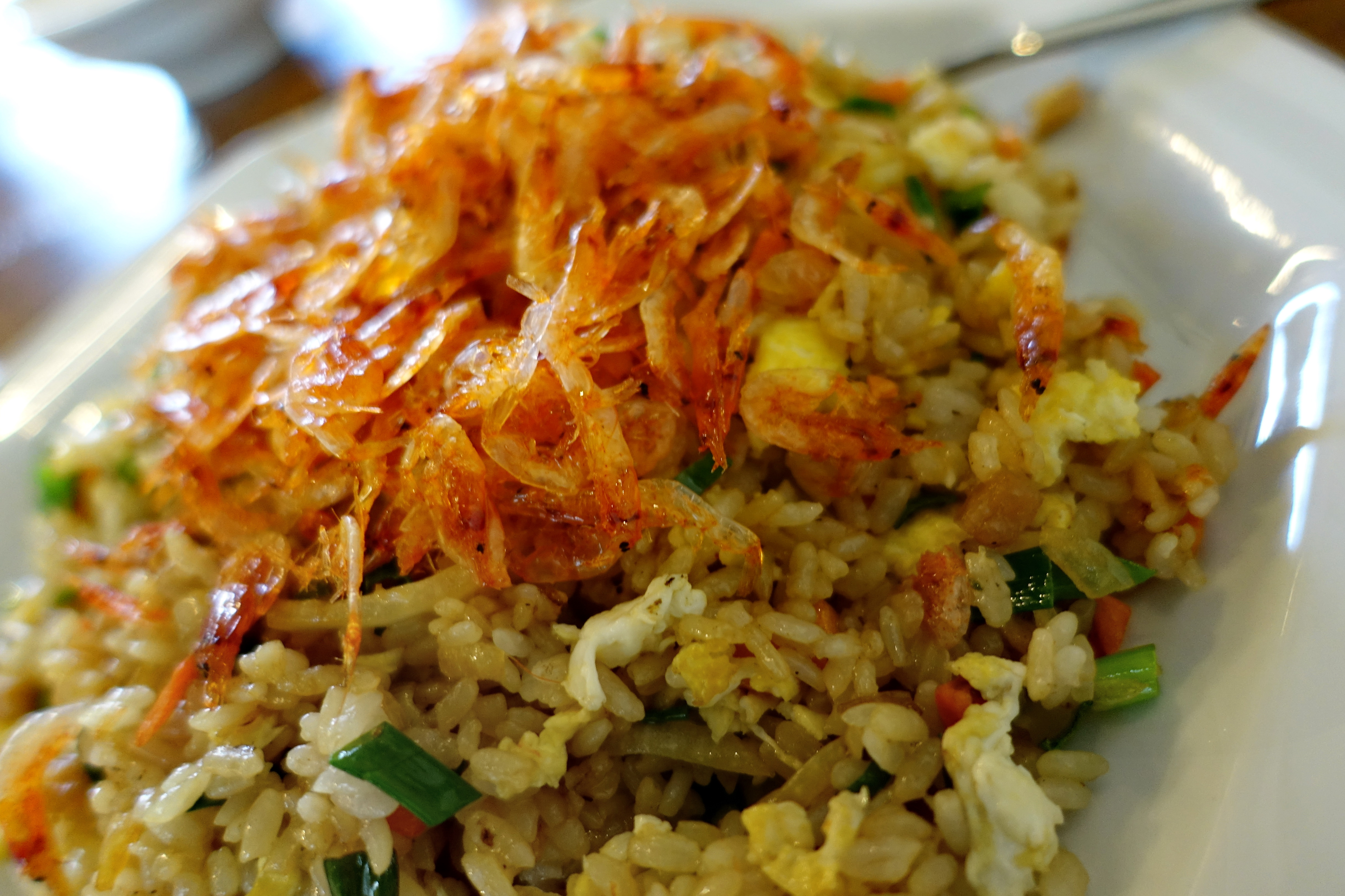
Sakura shrimp on fried rice

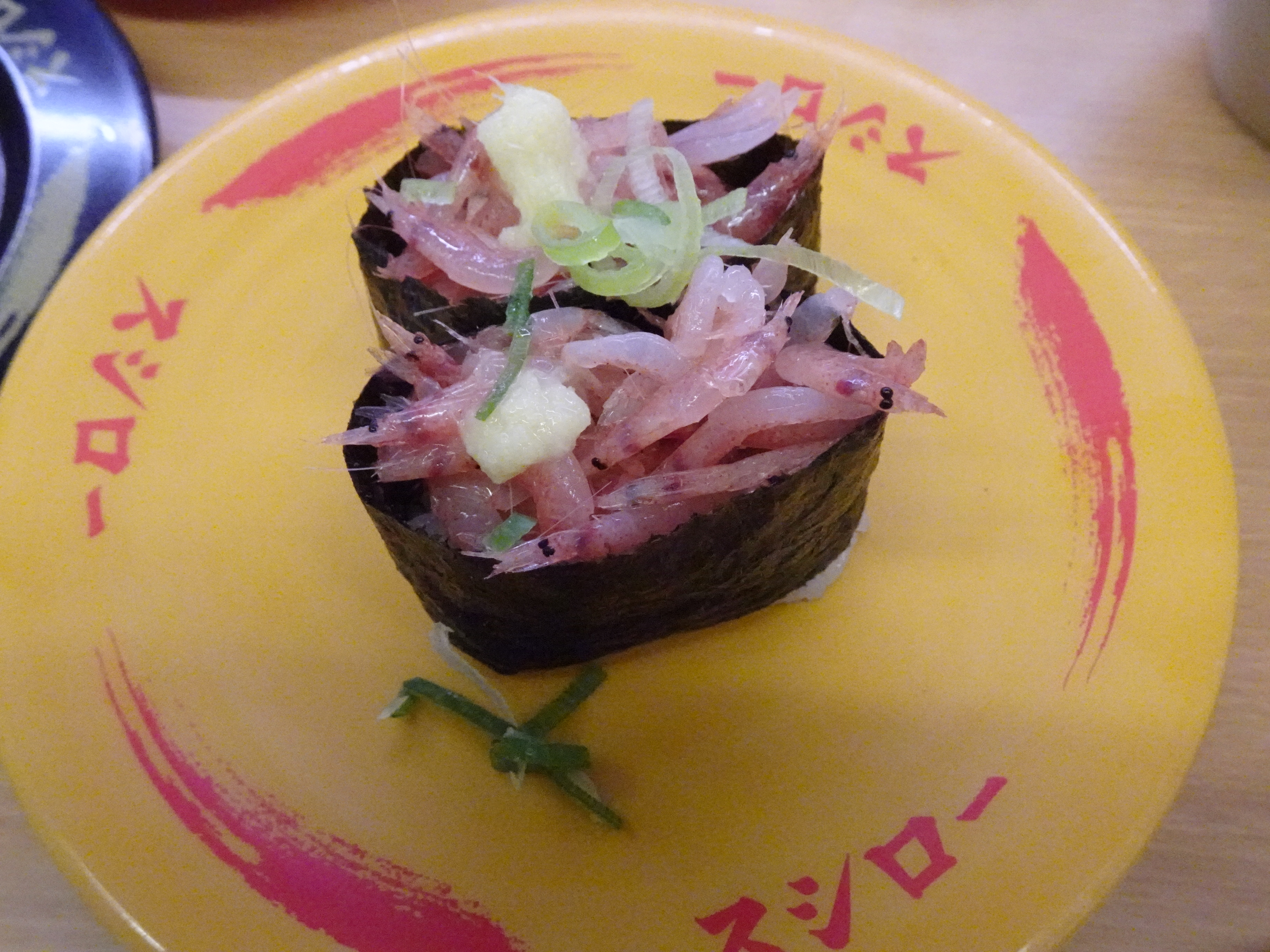
As sushi

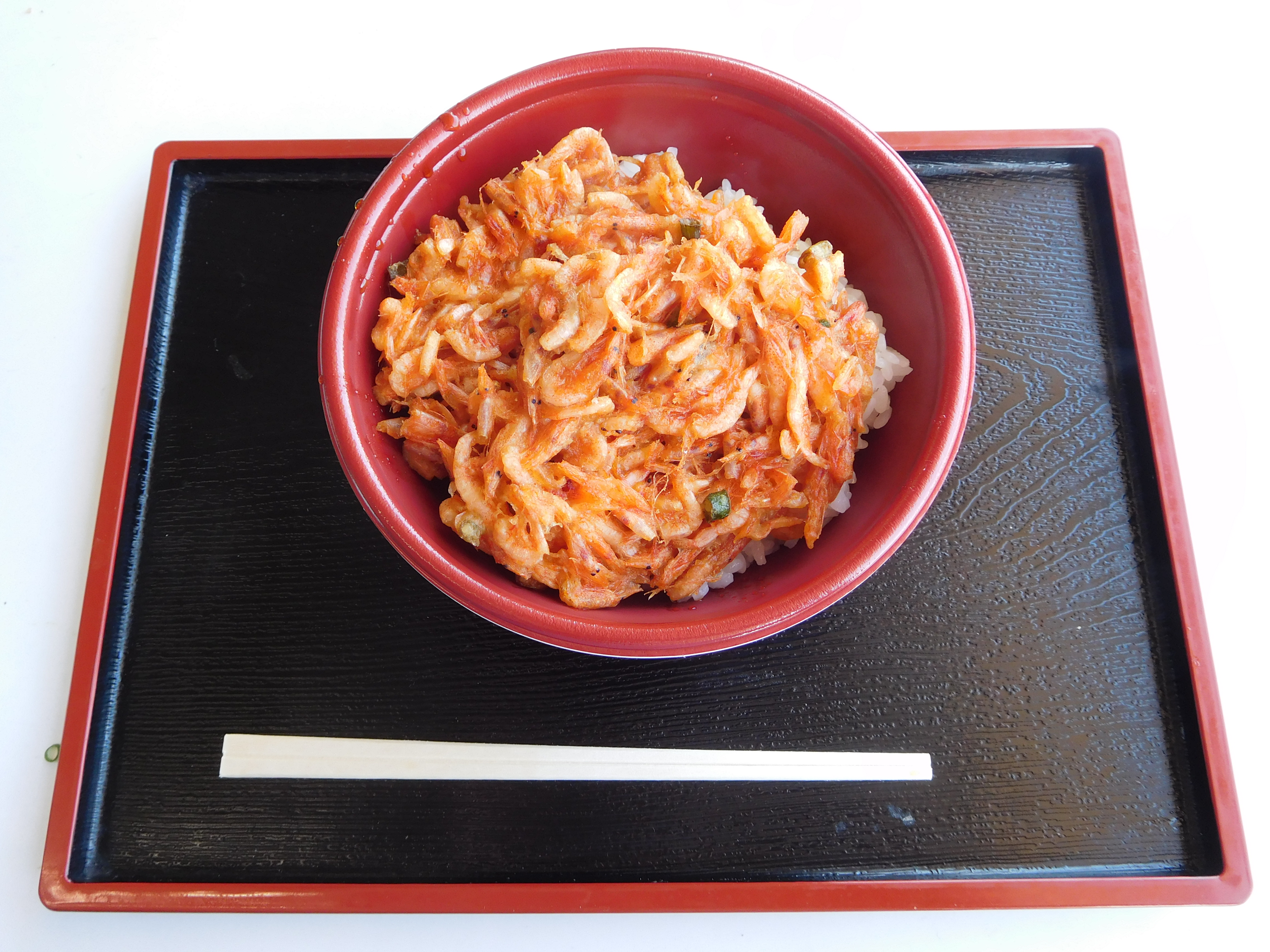
Sakura shrimp on rice

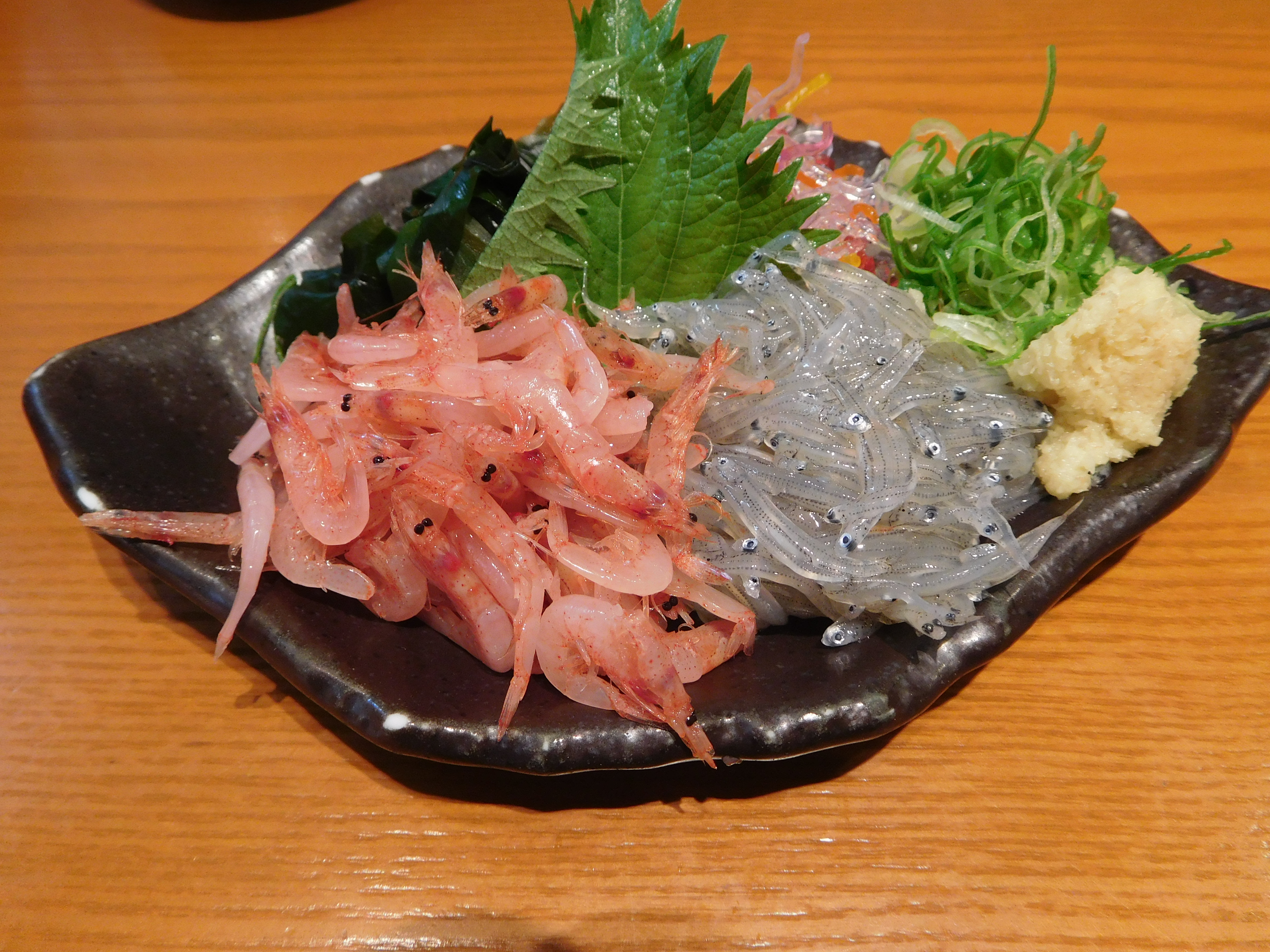
Sakura shrimp and whitebait sashimi

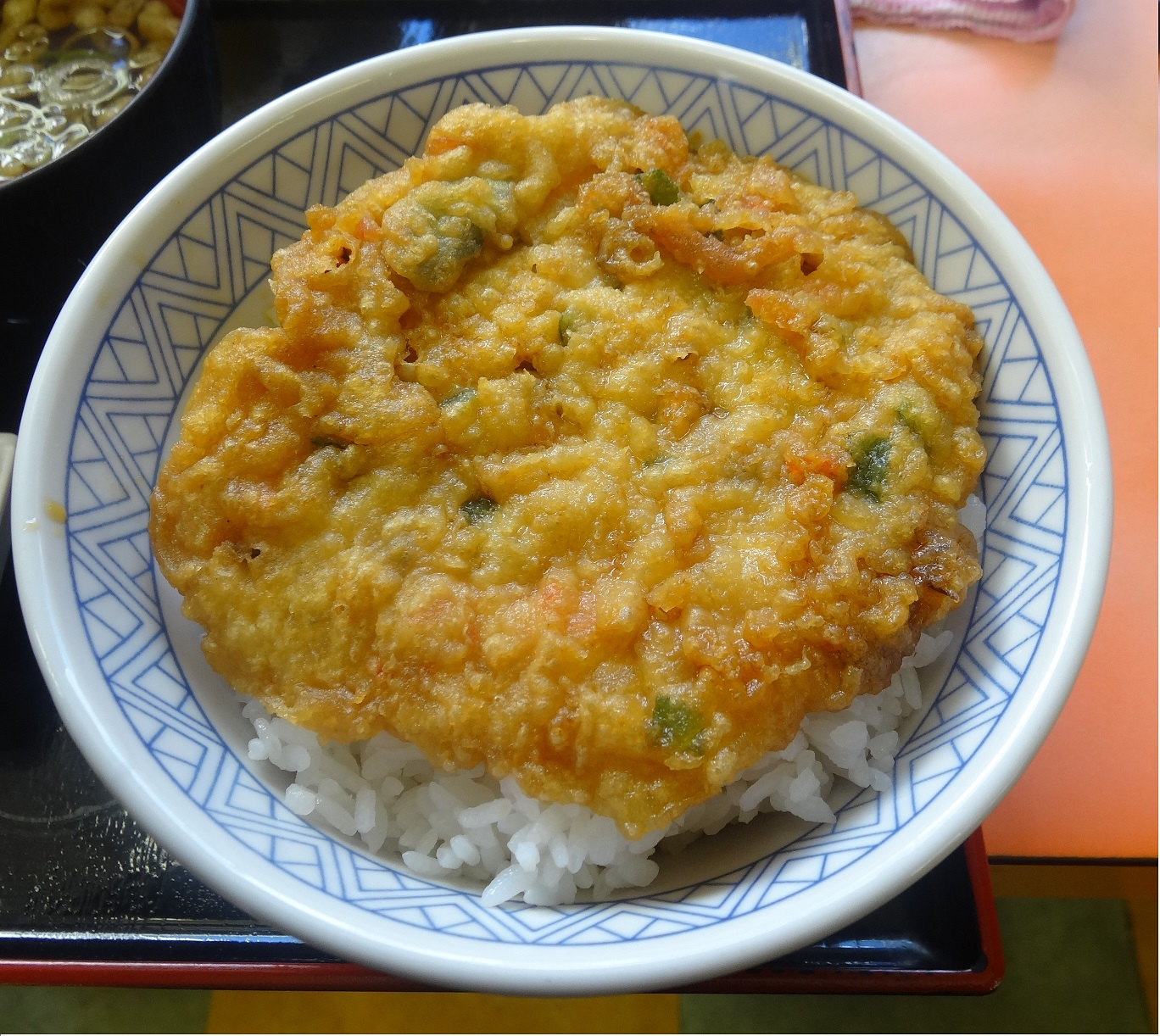
Shinagawa-don, rice and fried patty made of sakura shrimp and onions
