= List of festivals in Taiwan =

The following is an incomplete list of festivals in Taiwan, of all types.

== Festivals in Taiwan ==
- Pulima Art Festival
- Simple Life Festival
- Taipei International TV Market & Forum
- Taiwan Lantern Festival
- Taiwan Youth Day

=== Film festivals in Taiwan ===
- Golden Horse Film Festival and Awards
- Kaohsiung Film Festival
- Taipei Film Festival
- Taiwan International Documentary Festival
- Taiwan International Ethnographic Film Festival
- Taiwan International Queer Film Festival
- Women Make Waves

=== Folk festivals in Taiwan ===
- Amis harvest festivals
- Double Ninth Festival
- Double Third Festival
- Flying fish festival
- Harvest Festival
- Mid-Autumn Festival
- Pingxi Sky Lantern Festival
- Weiya
- Yilan International Children's Folklore and Folkgame Festival
- Zhong Yuan Festival

=== Garden festivals in Taiwan ===
- Taichung World Flora Exposition
- Taipei International Flora Exposition

=== Music festivals in Taiwan ===
- Amis Music Festival
- Beigang International Music Festival
- Fireball Fest.
- Formoz Festival
- Hohaiyan Rock Festival
- Megaport Music Festival
- Spring Scream
- Taichung Jazz Festival
- Taroko Music Festival

=== Religious festivals in Taiwan ===
- Baishatun Mazu Pilgrimage
- Baosheng Cultural Festival
- Bombing of Han Dan Festival
- Dajia Mazu Pilgrimage
- Donggang King Boat Festival
- Dongzhi Festival
- Lantern Festival
- Qing Shan King Sacrificial Ceremony
- Taipei Mother Goddess Cultural Festival
- Toucheng Ghost Grappling Festival
- Yanshui Beehive Fireworks Festival

== See also ==
- List of festivals in Asia#Taiwan
