= Shih Chia-hsin =

- 施佳鍟
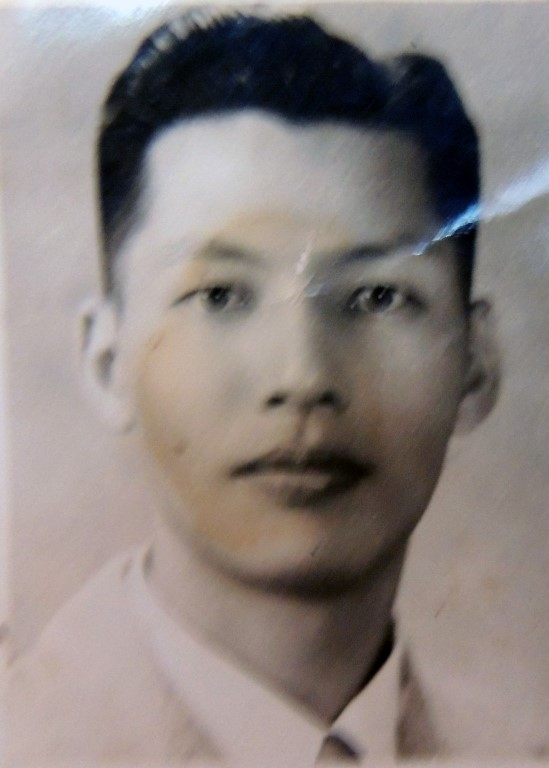

第2,3屆 Mayor of Donggang
- In office May 1954 – May 1960

Personal details
- Born: November 9, 1922 Tōkō town, Tōkō District, Takao Prefecture, Japanese Taiwan (modern-day Donggang, Pingtung County, Taiwan)
- Died: November 28, 2013 (aged 91) Kaohsiung, Taiwan

Shih Chia-hsin (Chinese: 施佳鍟; November 9, 1922 – November 27, 2013) was a Taiwanese liberal politician, financier and teacher. Born in the prosperous harbour of Donggang, he was twice elected as mayor of his hometown, in 1953 and 1956. Widely seen as a successful municipal administrator, Shih was forced out of politics for his disobedience to the Kuomintang (KMT) regime.

Shih spent his later life working in the financial field and became the first generation of Taiwanese bankers. First worked as a local manager, Shih was promoted as the business manager of Cathay Life Insurance, one of the largest business corporations in Taiwan for decades. From 1988 to his retirement in 2008, Shih served as executive director of Chinfon Commercial Bank.

== Major Achievements as the Mayor of Donggang ==
- Reconstruction of Donggang fishing harbour
- Construction of the Health Services Building in Donggang
- Modernisation of bridges in Donggang town centre
- Enhancement embankments in Donggang town centre
- Supply of comprehensive municipal water to the town centre and barrack areas
- Realisation of the first balanced town budget
- Introduction of new aquafarming techniques
- Restoration of Donggang King Boat Festival prohibited by KMT
