= Lords of the Three Mountains =

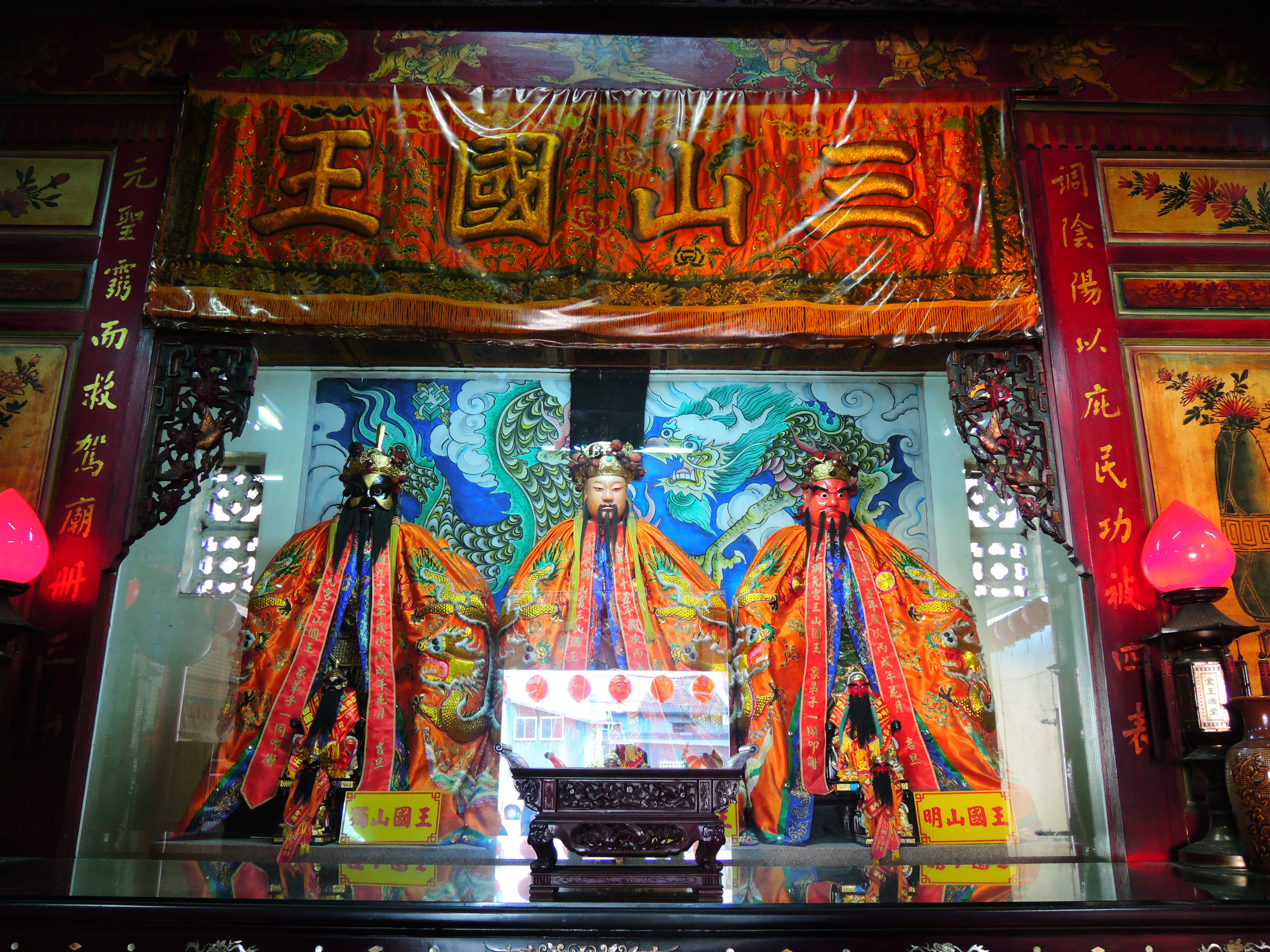
The temple of the Lords of the Three Mountains at Qingshui District, Taichung City, Taiwan.

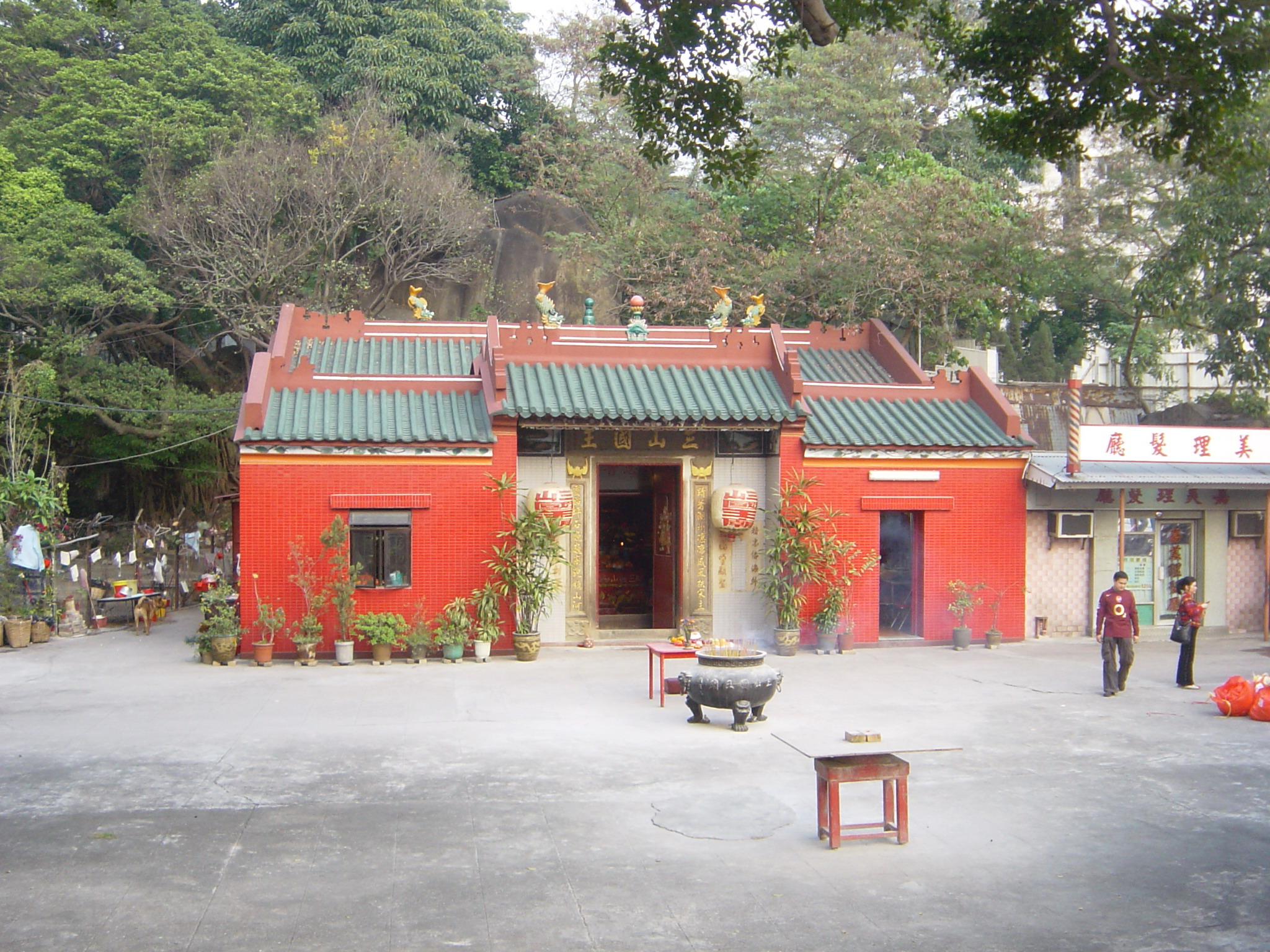
The temple of the Lords of the Three Mountains in the village of Ngau Chi Wan near Ping Shek Estate in Hong Kong.

The Lords of the Three Mountains (Chinese: 三山國王; pinyin: Sānshān Guówáng, also Kings of the Three Mountains, Three Mountain Kings or Sam Shan Kwok Wong) originate as guardian deities from the Jieyang region of Guangdong. They do not refer to “people,” but rather to the deified spirits of three mountains within Jieyang — Jin Mountain (巾山), Ming Mountain (明山), and Du Mountain (獨山). This is a prominent mountain‑god tradition in eastern Guangdong, including the Teochew (Chaozhou) and Meizhou areas.

There are many legends about the Lords of the Three Mountains. One version says that they were three generals serving under Emperor Wen of the Sui dynasty. After their deaths, they were venerated by later generations in recognition of their outstanding military achievements. During the Song dynasty, it is said that the three generals manifested their divine power to help the Song emperor repel enemy forces. Believing them to be incarnations of mountain gods, the emperor granted them the title “Three Mountain Kings.”

The belief is widespread among Teochew and Hakka communities in Taiwan and Southeast Asia. It is said that during the Song dynasty, the three were granted the title of “kings,” after which Hakka, Teochew, and Haifeng‑Lufeng people regarded them as their protective deities. In iconography, the First King (Jin Mountain) has a white face, the Second King (Ming Mountain) a red face, and the Third King (Du Mountain) a black face.

== Daoism ==
Lords of the Three Mountains are closely intertwined with Daoism, a relationship expressed on three main levels: the Daoist transformation of natural‑spirit worship, their placement within the Daoist divine hierarchy, and ritual practice. Although the cult originated as a form of popular mountain‑spirit worship, over time it was fully absorbed into the Daoist pantheon.

Regarding the Daoist “transformation” and personification of natural worship: the Three Mountain Kings originally arose from the veneration of three famous mountains in the Jieyang region of Guangdong. According to Daoist and folk legends, these mountain spirits manifested their power to assist Emperor Taizong of the Song in quelling unrest. They were therefore granted the title of “Kings” and given specific personal names, Lian Jie (連傑), Zhao Xuan (趙軒), and Qiao Jun (喬俊), along with official honorifics. This process—where a natural spirit becomes a personified deity and receives imperial investiture—is a classic pattern in the formation of Daoist gods.

In terms of their position within the Daoist hierarchy: within Daoism’s multi‑layered pantheon, the Three Mountain Kings are classified as gods of the earth or “earthly deities” (地祇). They function as protective gods, regarded as local guardians endowed with the power to repel evil, suppress malevolent forces, and avert calamities—roles similar to many regional Daoist deities such as City Gods (城隍) or Earth Gods (土地公). According to the Zhouli and Daoist tradition, divine beings are divided into heavenly gods, earthly spirits, and human ghosts. As mountain spirits, the Three Mountain Kings belong to the category of earthly deities and are under the authority of the highest celestial rulers, such as the Jade Emperor (玉皇大帝).

In Daoist ritual practice and temple administration: the daily offerings, jiao rites (醮典), such as pacification and blessing ceremonies (建醮祈安), and birthday celebrations for the Three Mountain Kings all follow Daoist liturgical tradition. In Taiwan, Hong Kong, and mainland China, most temples dedicated to the Three Mountain Kings are officially registered as Daoist institutions. Their architectural style and iconography—such as the deities holding swords or halberds—also reflect strong Daoist characteristics. Although they belong to the Daoist system, in actual social practice their worship often blends elements of Buddhism and Confucianism; for example, some temples are managed by Buddhist monks or enshrine Guanyin alongside the Three Mountain Kings.

== Imagery and Symbolism ==
The facial colors of the Three Mountain Kings (the First King in white, the Second King in red, and the Third King in black) are closely tied to their divine attributes, folk narratives, and traditional Five‑Elements symbolism:

=== First King (Jin Mountain) — White Face ===
White traditionally signifies purity, integrity, fairness, and refinement. According to legend, Lian Jie, the First King, "King of Purifying National Virtues" (清化威德報國王), is regarded as the eldest of the three brothers. His divine character leans toward a “civil” or supervisory role, giving him the dignified yet approachable presence of a venerable elder.

=== Second King (Ming Mountain) — Red Face ===
Red in folk religion represents loyalty, righteousness, passion, and martial valor—similar to the iconic image of Lord Guan (Guansheng Dijun). Zhao Xuan, the Second King, "King Who Assists in Rectification and Brings Clarity and Peace to the Realm" (助改明肅寧國王), is portrayed in legends as the one who assists and carries out missions. His red face expresses his sincerity, courage, and commanding spirit.

=== Third King (Du Mountain) — Black (or Dark Red) Face ===
Black is commonly associated with firmness, bravery, and the power to dispel evil and subdue malevolent forces. Qiao Jun, the Third King, “King of Abundant Blessings, Majestic Power, and Responsive Aid.” (惠威弘應豐國王) is described as the fiercest and most martial of the three, responsible for averting disasters and vanquishing demons. His black face conveys his awe‑inspiring, battle‑ready nature.

== Temples ==
=== Taiwan ===
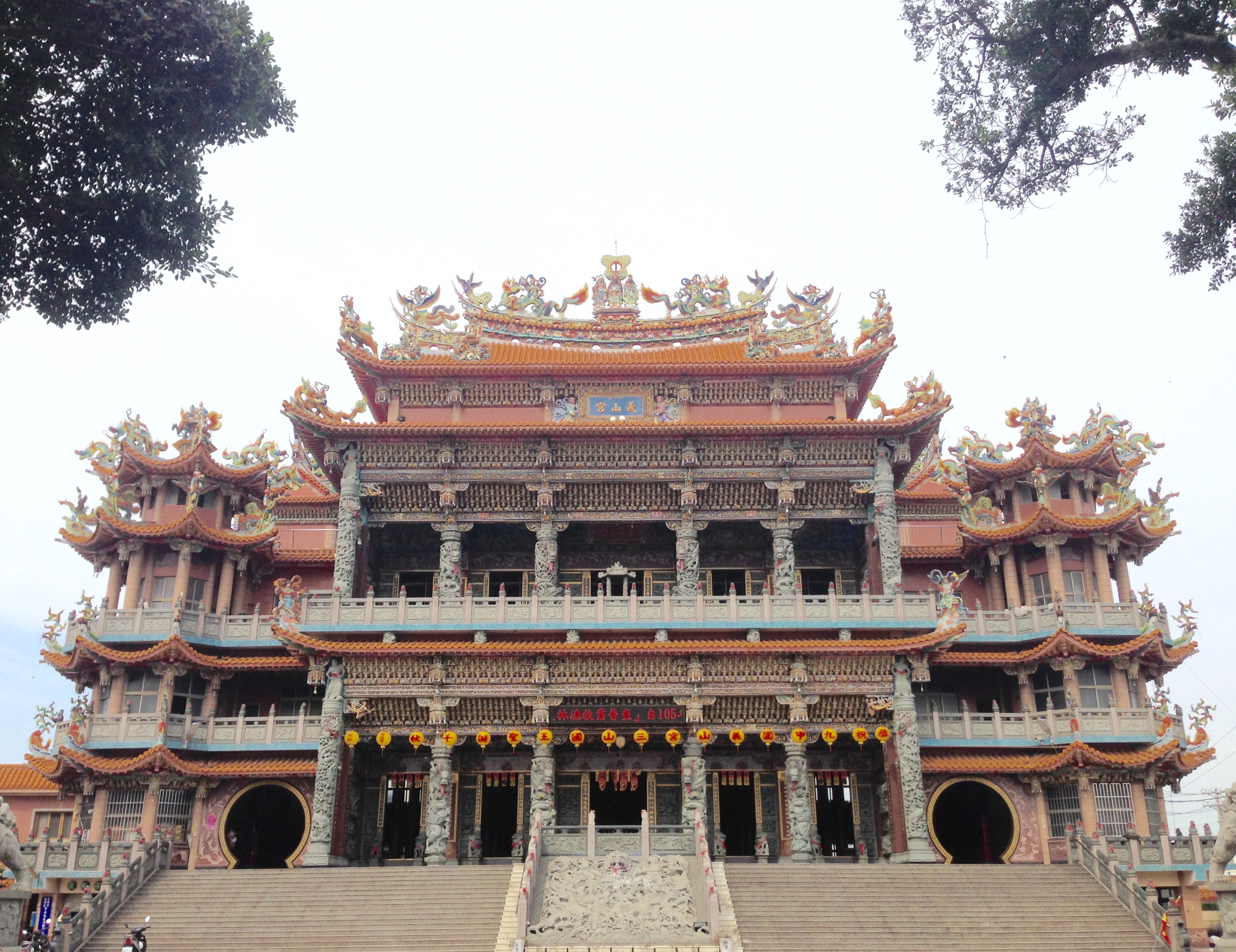
Jiujiawei Yishan Temple

Temples dedicated to the Three Mountain Kings are very common in Taiwan. According to statistics from the Ministry of the Interior, there are 184 such temples across the island, with Yilan County having the highest number at 40. In earlier times, a common stereotype held that the Three Mountain Kings were exclusively deities of Hakka worship. However, the prevailing view today is that identifying the Three Mountain Kings as solely a Hakka belief is a misunderstanding.

In Taiwan, the largest Three Mountain Kings temple in terms of architectural scale is Jiujiawei Yishan Temple (九甲圍義山宮), located in Qiaotou District (橋頭區), Kaohsiung. Built in Yongli 22 of the Ming Zheng period (1668), the temple covers more than 500 pings of land and is renowned for its splendid, gold‑and‑jade architecture. It features twenty temple doors carved from single pieces of cypress wood, showcasing exceptionally refined craftsmanship.

Located in Xihu (溪湖), Changhua, the Hepolun Linzhao Temple (荷婆崙霖肇宮) is an exceptionally revered site within Taiwan’s Three Mountain Kings tradition and is honored as the “Founding Temple of Taiwan.” It is regarded as the ancestral temple of all Three Mountain Kings temples in the Changhua region, and more than thirty temples across Taiwan trace their incense lineage back to this site. According to tradition, the temple was first established in the 15th year of the Wanli reign of the Ming dynasty (1587), giving it a history of more than four centuries and making it one of the earliest Three Mountain Kings temples in Taiwan. Legend recounts that in Wanli 14 (1586), two farmers from Jieyang County in Guangdong—Ma Yixiong (馬義雄) and Zhou Yusen (周榆森) — crossed the sea to Taiwan to harvest lotus seeds. They accidentally left behind a sachet containing incense from the ancestral “Lintian Temple” (霖田祖廟) on a small mound beside a lotus pond. That night, a mysterious light shone from the spot, and the local residents, sensing a divine presence, pooled their resources to build a temple for worship. The temple site was originally a mound surrounded by a marsh filled with blooming lotuses. To commemorate the ancestral temple’s location in “Hepo Town” (河婆鎮), the residents named the place “Hepolun” (荷婆崙).

The oldest among these temples is the Three Mountain Kings Temple in Jiuru Township, Pingtung County. It is considered one of the earliest Three Mountain Kings temples in Taiwan and is renowned for its unique “Lady Consort of the King” (王爺奶奶) legend. This story—an extraordinary tale of a union between a human and a deity—has been passed down for more than two centuries. According to the legend, the heroine was a Hakka girl from Linluo Township (麟洛鄉) named Xu Xiutao (徐秀桃). During the Jiaqing era of the Qing dynasty, the First King of the Jiuru Three Mountain Kings Temple was said to have fallen in love with her at first sight while on a ritual procession through Linluo. Later, while Xu Xiutao was washing clothes by the river, she discovered a wooden box containing a golden hairpin. Not long after bringing it home, she died suddenly and inexplicably. The Xu family later received a divine revelation explaining that the First King had taken Xu Xiutao as his wife. The temple then carved a deity statue in her honor and enshrined her with the respectful title “Lady Consort of the King.” This legend not only forms the heart of local religious belief but also helped ease early tensions between Hoklo and Hakka communities. Today, it is recognized as an important item of Pingtung County’s intangible cultural heritage.

=== Hong Kong ===
In Hong Kong, temples dedicated to the Three Mountain Kings serve as important religious centers for Chaozhou and Hakka immigrant communities, enshrining the three mountain deities of Jin Mountain, Ming Mountain, and Du Mountain from Jieyang County in Guangdong. At present, there are about seven to eight Three Mountain Kings temples across the territory, among which the Ngau Chi Wan Three Mountain Kings Temple is the largest in scale and the oldest in history. The major Three Mountain Kings temples in Hong Kong include:

Ngau Chi Wan Sam Shan Kwok Wong Temple (牛池灣三山國王廟), located on Kwun Tong Road near Ping Shek Estate and Choi Hung Station, dates back to 1911. It primarily venerates the “Third Brother” of the Three Kings and historically served as the principal religious centre for the surrounding Hakka villages. The temple is built of granite, with red walls and green roof tiles. Its roof is adorned with ceramic figurines, and the structure follows a “two-hall, three-bay” (兩進三間) layout. The main hall houses three altars dedicated respectively to the Three Mountain Kings, the Dark Altar Deity (玄壇), and the Tai Sui. Near the entrance stands a unique bell-shaped iron plate—found only here in Hong Kong—which, when struck by worshippers, produces a resonant sound like that of a bronze bell. The temple was designated a Grade III historic building in 2010.

The Kwun Tong Sam Shan Kwok Wong Temple (觀塘三山國王廟) stands along Fuk Hong Path near Chai Cheuk Wan and Lam Tin Station. It was built with the support of the local Teochew association and neighbourhood residents.

Lamma Island is home to two Sam Shan Kwok Wong Temples—one in Ko Long Village (高塱村), Yung Shue Wan, and another in Pak Kok Village (北角村). The Ko Long temple sits directly beside the Tin Hau Temple and is one of the few Three Mountain Kings temples found in Hong Kong’s outlying islands.

The Deep Bay Village Sam Shan Kwok Wong Temple (深石村三山國王廟) on Lantau Island is situated in the remote settlement of Sham Shek, where it continues to serve the local community.
