= King Boat Cultural Museum =

Museum in Donggang, Pingtung County, Taiwan

- 王船文化館
- Established: 2024
- Location: Donggang, Pingtung County, Taiwan
- Coordinates: 22°27′49.4″N 120°27′36.1″E

King Boat Cultural Museum exterior

The King Boat Cultural Museum (traditional Chinese: 王船文化館; simplified Chinese: 王船文化馆; pinyin: Wáng Chuán Wénhuàguǎn) is a museum in Donggang Township, Pingtung County, Taiwan.

== History ==
The planning to establish the museum started in 2018 to preserve the King Boat ceremony culture. The groundbreaking ceremony for the museum was held on 22 December 2021, officiated by Pan Men-an, the Pingtung County Magistrate. The museum opened in 2024.

== Architecture ==
The design of the museum resembles a ship on the sea. It has an opening at the top to represent the eye of a dragon and wavy lines at the bottom to represent the sea waves. The museum will also include a theater, audio visual room, library and classroom.

== See also ==
- List of museums in Taiwan
