= Kuo Ting-tsai =

Taiwanese politician (1936–2015)

- 郭廷才

Member of the Legislative Yuan
- In office 1 February 1993 – 31 January 2002
- Constituency: Pingtung County

Personal details
- Born: 28 September 1936 Tōkō, Takao Prefecture, Taiwan, Empire of Japan (today Donggang, Pingtung, Taiwan)
- Died: 9 April 2015 (aged 78)
- Party: Kuomintang

Kuo Ting-tsai (Chinese: 郭廷才; pinyin: Guō Tíngcái; 28 September 1936 – 9 April 2015) was a Taiwanese politician.

He was born in Donggang, Pingtung, where he began his political career as mayor. He was later elected to four consecutive terms on the Pingtung County Council, including three as council speaker, and served on the Legislative Yuan from 1993 to 2002 as a representative of Pingtung County. Kuo was charged with breach of trust, fraud and falsification of documentation in September 1999, as the Pingtung County Prosecutors' Office investigated Kuo for actions taken during his leadership of Tungkang Credit Cooperative from 1992 to 1999. In November 2000, Kuo was sentenced to a prison term of twelve years. He ran for reelection in 2001, but was unable to retain his legislative seat. In February 2005, Kuo left for China, and was traced to Zhongshan in November 2010, when he was repatriated.

Kuo died of cancer complications in April 2015, aged 78.
