= Checheng Fu'an Temple =

Chinese temple in Checheng, Pingtung County, Taiwan

- 車城福安宮
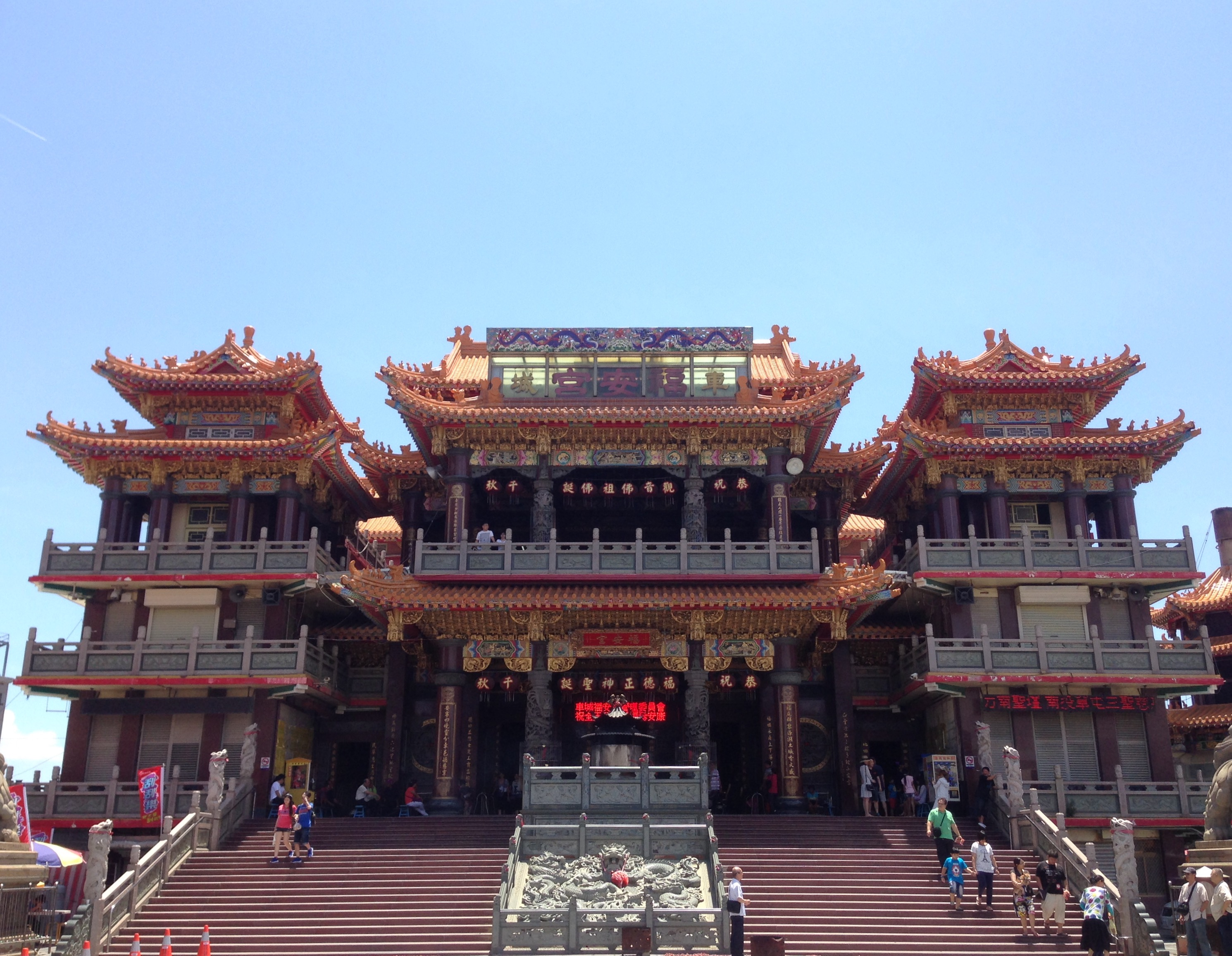

- Location within Pingtung County

Religion
- Deity: Tudigong

Location
- Location: Checheng, Pingtung County, Taiwan
- Interactive map of Checheng Fu'an Temple
- Coordinates: 22°04′15.5″N 120°42′38.9″E

Architecture
- Type: temple
- Completed: 1662

The Checheng Fu'an Temple (traditional Chinese: 車城福安宮; simplified Chinese: 车城福安宫; pinyin: Chēchéng Fú'ān Gōng) is a temple in Checheng Township, Pingtung County, Taiwan.

== History ==
The temple was originally built as the Jinsheng Pavilion in 1662 to worship Tudigong during the Qing Dynasty under Kangxi Emperor to accommodate migrant people from Quanzhou in Checheng. It was later renamed as Fu'an Shrine after funds were raised and the pavilion was renovated during the Jiaqing Emperor. In 1953, it was officially renamed as Checheng Fu'an Temple.

== Architecture ==
The temple was built with Northern China royal temple style, and consists of three floors to allow for various forms of traditional veneration. It is the largest temple in Taiwan that is dedicated to Tudigong. The temple's vicinity hosts large furnaces for offerings, such as Joss paper.

== See also ==
- Chaolin Temple
- Donglong Temple
- Three Mountains King Temple
- List of temples in Taiwan
- List of tourist attractions in Taiwan
