= Wanluan =

Rural township in Pingtung County, Taiwan

Coordinates: 22.5727°N 120.5678°E

Wanluan Township 萬巒鄉
- Rural township

- Wanluan Township in Pingtung County
- Location: Pingtung County, Taiwan

Area
  - Total: 61 km^{2} (24 sq mi)

Population (February 2024)
  - Total: 19,217
  - Density: 320/km^{2} (820/sq mi)

Wanluan Township (Chinese: 萬巒鄉; pinyin: Wànluán Xiāng) is a rural township in Pingtung County, Taiwan. The township is famed for its braised ham hock dish.

== Geography ==
It has a population total of 19,217 and an area of 60.73 square kilometres (23.45 sq mi).

== Administrative divisions ==
Villages in Wanluan Township

The township comprises 14 villages: Chengde, Chishan, Jiahe, Jiazuo, Liuhuang, Luliao, Sigou, Wanhe, Wanjin, Wanluan, Wanquan, Wugou, Xincuo and Xinzhi.

== Tourist attractions ==
The township is famed for its braised ham hock dish. This local dish became nationally known after President Chiang Ching-kuo enjoyed them during a visit in 1981. The local delicacy is only prepared from the front feet of the pig and is marinated in medicinal herbs.

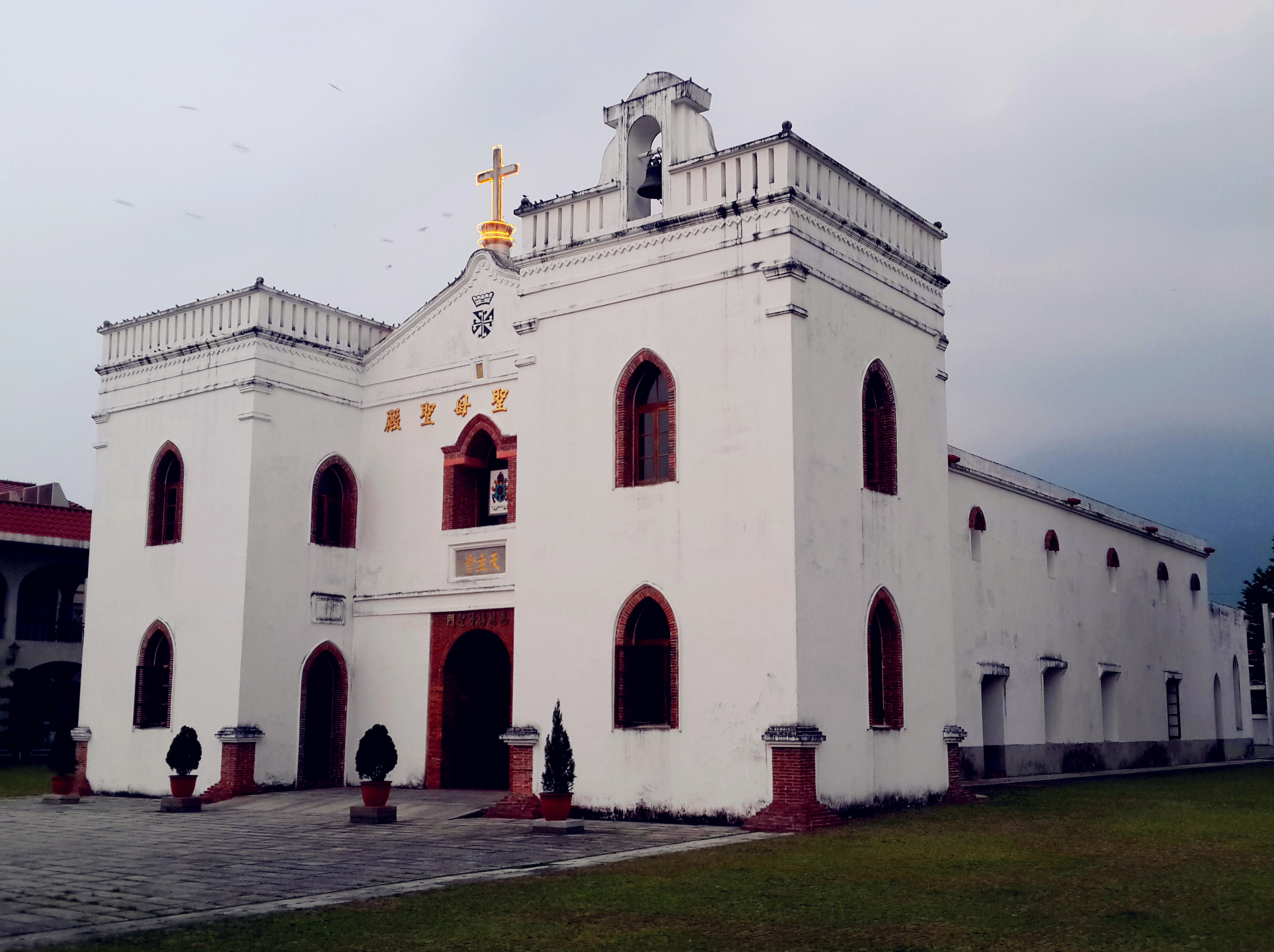
Wanchin Church

- Dapeng Round-the-Bay Bikeway
- Wanchin Basilica of the Immaculate Conception
- Wukou Village Liou Family Ancestral Hall

== Notable natives ==
- Lo Chih-ming, member of Legislative Yuan (2002-2008)

== Sister city relations ==
- – Kamikoani, Akita, Japan
