= Taipei International TV Market & Forum =

Annual Asian TV program industry convention

Taipei TV Festival
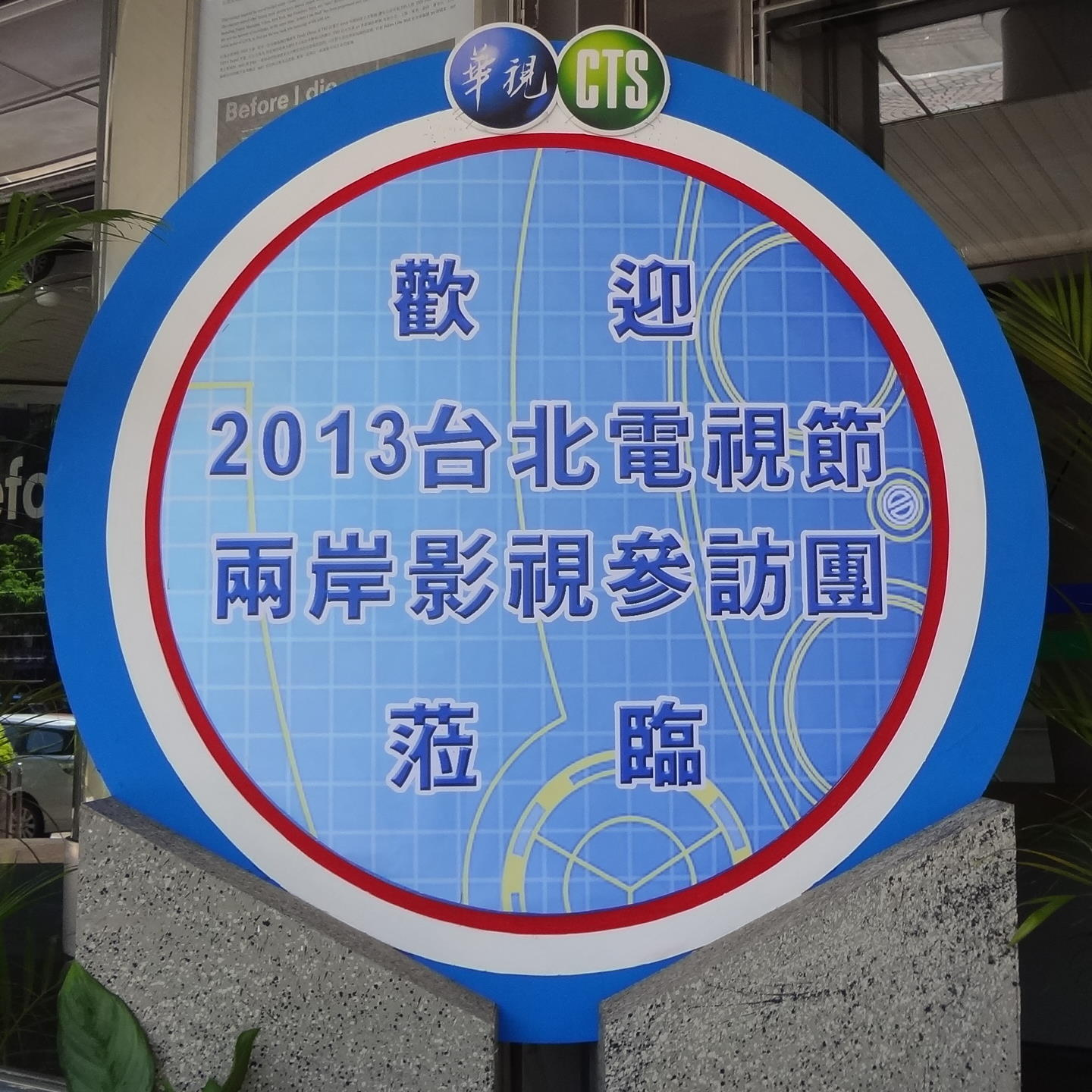
- Location: Taipei
- Founded: 2004
- Hosted by: Bureau of Audiovisual and Music Industry Development
- Language: Chinese, English
- Website: ttf.tavis.tw

The Taipei International TV Market & Forum(台北電視節), formerly known as Taipei TV festival (TTF), is a major platform for copyright trading in Asia-made TV programs. It is hosted by the Bureau of Audiovisual and Music Industry Development of the Republic of China. and it has been taking place every year in September since its establishment in 2004.

According to its official website, the festival views the TV content industry as a major driving force of the country's overall cultural development. So, it hopes to establish Taiwan as a major supply hub for TV talents and to lead the development of Taiwan's film and TV industry toward internationalization.

The Taipei TV Festival has built up a solid foundation over the ten years since its establishment, and the number of signed business contracts has been increasing every year. According to the Film Bureau under the Ministry of Culture, the number of participating companies in the annual festivals increased from 33 in the first annual festival in 2004 to 95 companies from 14 different countries in the 10th, the duration of its shows have been increasing as well. Participants include major television companies and media production companies in Taiwan, multimedia from China and Hong Kong, as well as international media such as Voice of America, British Broadcasting Corporation, Fox Networks Group, Korean Broadcasting System, Al Jazeera, etc..
