= Donggang, Pingtung =

Urban township in Pingtung County, Taiwan

Coordinates: 22°28′00″N 120°27′16″E

Donggang Township 東港鎮 Tōkō; Tungkang
- Urban township
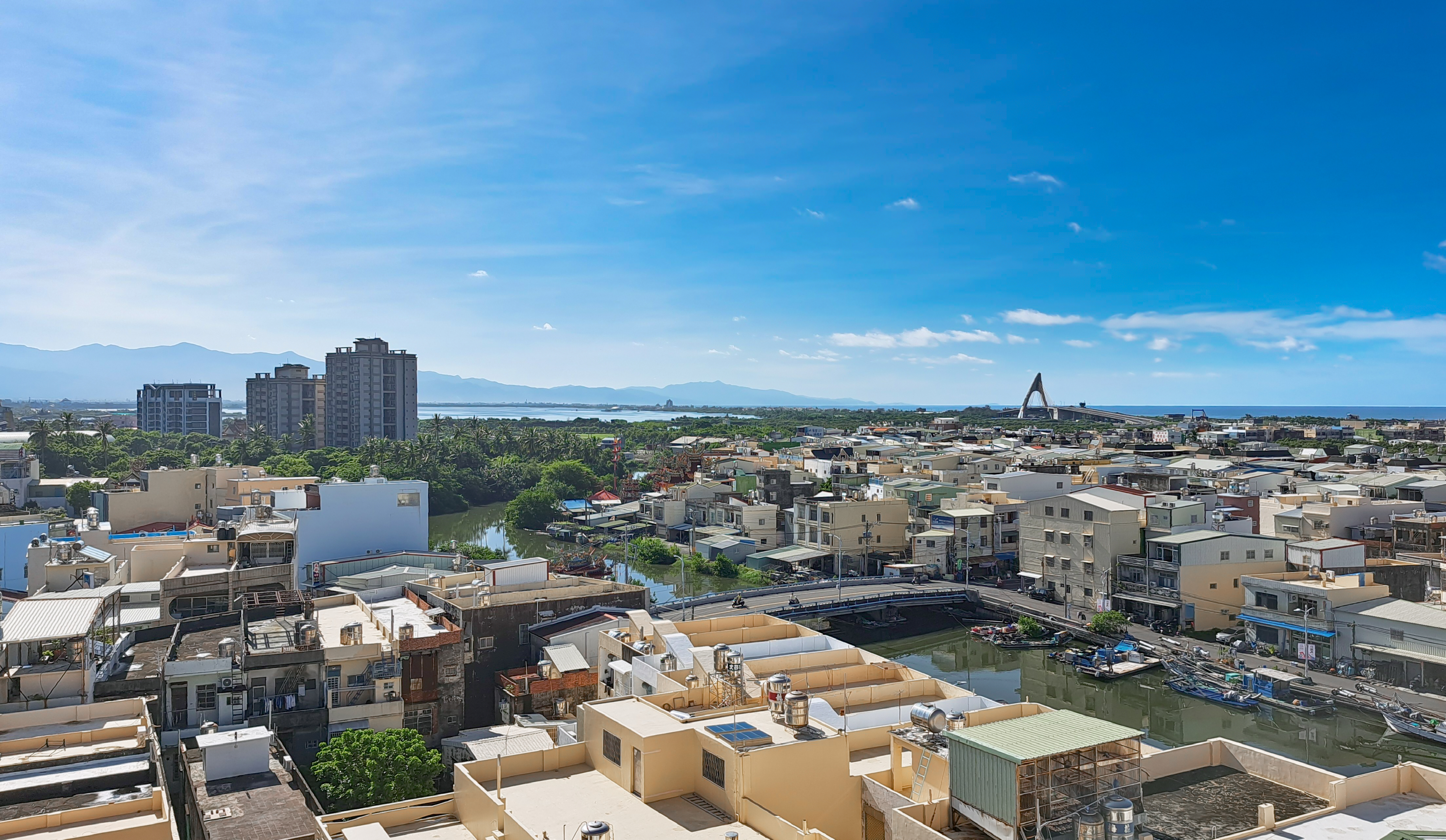

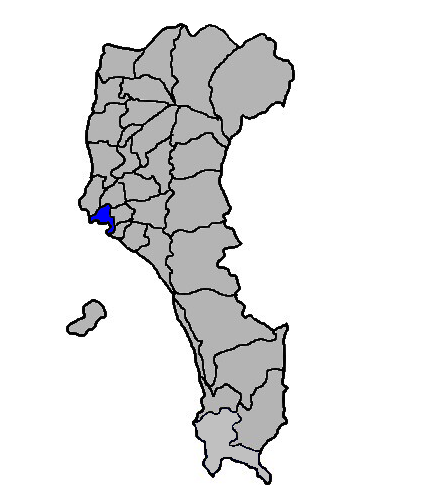
- Donggang Township in Pingtung County
- Location: Pingtung County, Taiwan

Area
  - Total: 29 km^{2} (11 sq mi)

Population (February 2024)
  - Total: 45,972
  - Density: 1,600/km^{2} (4,100/sq mi)

Dongang Township
- Traditional Chinese: 東港鎮
- Literal meaning: East port township
- Hanyu Pinyin: Dōnggǎng Zhèn
- Wade–Giles: Tung^{1}-Kang^{3} Chen^{4}
- Pha̍k-fa-sṳ: Tûng-kóng-tsṳ́n
- Hokkien POJ: Tang-káng-tìn
- Tâi-lô: Tang-káng-tìn

Donggang Township or Tungkang Township (Chinese: 東港鎭) is an urban township in west-central Pingtung County, Taiwan. Located on Taiwan's western coastline, along the Taiwan Strait, it has one of Taiwan's largest fishing harbors. Dapeng Bay with its national scenic area is just south of Donggang.

The town also hosts Donglong Temple (Chinese: 東隆宮; pinyin: Dōnglóng Gōng; Pe̍h-ōe-jī: Tang-liông-kiong), which is dedicated to "Lord Wen" (Chinese: 溫王爺; pinyin: Wēn Wángyé; Pe̍h-ōe-jī: Un-ông-iâ. The word Wen is pronounced the same as "plague" in both Hokkien and Mandarin Chinese) and is known for its triannual ceremony of "burning lord's boat" (burning plague boat).

== History ==
Donggang was opened as a port by the Chinese admiral Koxinga in the 17th century. It was a major commercial port for Taiwan until the end of the 19th century. During Japanese rule, it was placed under Takao Prefecture as Tōkō town (東港街) and served the Japanese naval facilities in Dapeng Bay.

== Administrative divisions ==
The township comprises 23 villages: Bade, Chengyu, Chuantou, Dapeng, Datan, Dingxin, Dingzhong, Fengyu, Gonghe, Jialian, Nanping, Tunghe, Tunglong, Xiabu, Xinghe, Xingnong, Xingtai, Xingtung, Xingyu, Xinsheng, Zenghai, Zhaoan and Zhongxing.

== Economy ==
Donggang's primary economic activities are fishing and agriculture. The town has a tourism industry which peaks during April to June, due to the availability and increasing popularity of the southern bluefin tuna for sashimi. The town's other delicacies include karasumi (desalinated mullet roe) and sakura shrimp.

== Tourist attractions ==
- Dapeng Bay national scenic area
- Donglong Temple
- Jinde Bridge
- Penbay International Circuit
- Tongkang Mosque
- King Boat Cultural Museum

== Notable natives ==
- Shih Chia-hsin, mayor of Donggang (1953-1959)
- Kuo Ting-tsai, member of Legislative Yuan (1993–2002)
- Lee Shying-jow, Minister of Veterans Affairs Council (2016–2018)

== Transportation ==
The nearest railway stations to Donggang Township are Nanzhou Station or Linbian Station of the TR Pingtung Line. Ferry services connect Donggang to Baisha Port and Dafu Port on Lamay Island.
