= Chaolin Temple =

Temple in Chaozhou, Pingtung County, Taiwan

Coordinates: 22.5455°N 120.5684°E

- 朝林宮
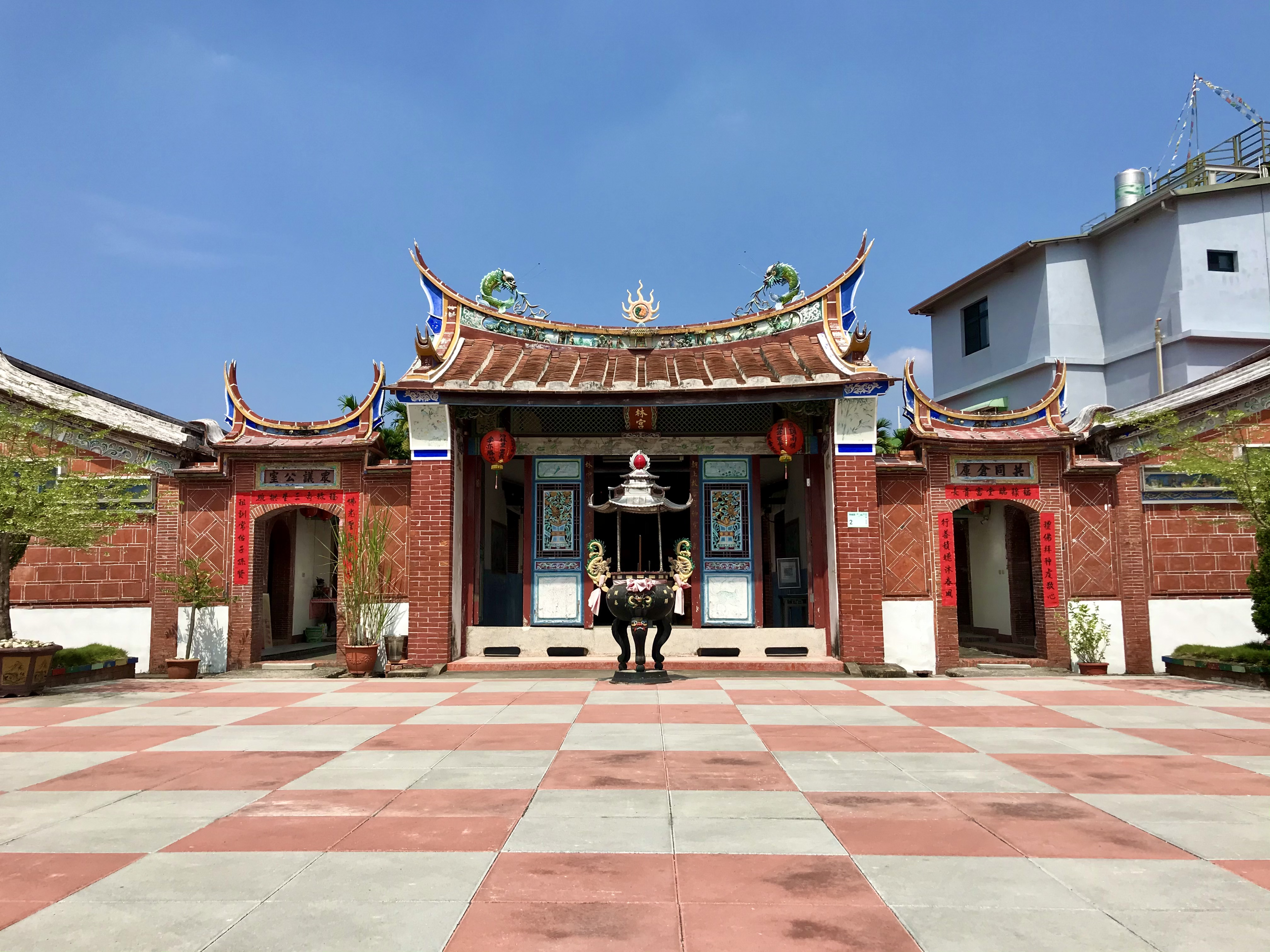

Location
- Location: Chaozhou, Pingtung County, Taiwan
- Interactive map of Chaolin Temple

Architecture
- Type: Temple
- Established: 1909

Chaolin Temple (Chinese: 朝林宮; pinyin: Cháolín Gōng) is a temple located in Silin Village, Chaozhou Township, Pingtung County, Taiwan.

== History ==
Chaolin Temple traces its history to the 1850s, when a farmer surnamed Chen sought to donate his land and construct a temple to Nezha. A feng shui practitioner advised against the temple's construction, and it was not built in Chen's lifetime. After the feng shui practitioner had also died, Nezha began appearing to Chen's descendants, warning of heavy rains if the temple was not constructed soon. The rains that came caused flooding, and the floods washed the coffin of the feng shui practitioner into a pond. The coffin circled the pond three times, then sank and vanished. A second origin story also involves floodwaters, in this case diverted by an apparition of a child, which saved the village. Afterwards, local leaders collected funds to construct a temple, and the Chen family donated land for its construction.

Following the flood, Chaolin Temple was completed in 1909. However, during Japanese rule, Chinese folk religion was repressed. When the Kuomintang-led government required temples to be placed on a registry in 1973, township leader Chen Jung-chieh submitted Chaolin Temple under a neighboring address. A community and elder care program that had launched in 2006 is hosted at Chaolin Temple. Chaolin Temple was designated a historical site by the Pingtung County Government in 2006. The temple received its own address in 2020.
