= Donglong Temple =

Chinese temple in Donggang, Pingtung County, Taiwan

- 東港東隆宮
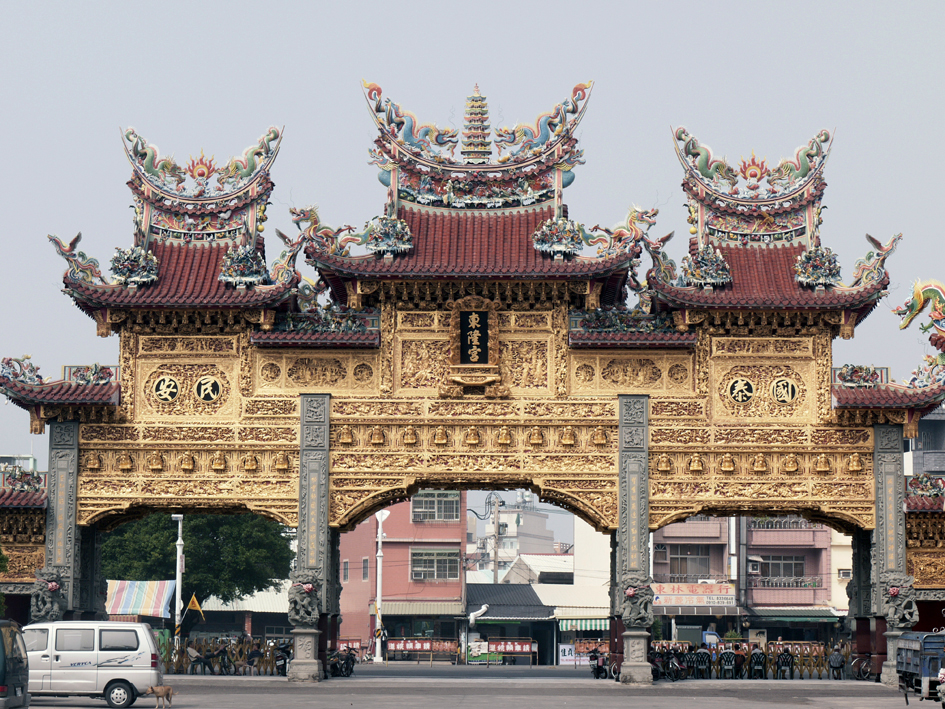

- Location within Pingtung County

Religion
- Affiliation: Taoism

Location
- Location: Donggang, Pingtung County, Taiwan
- Interactive map of Donglong Temple
- Coordinates: 22°27′46.9″N 120°26′55.7″E

Architecture
- Type: temple
- Completed: 1706

The Donglong Temple (Chinese: 東隆宮; pinyin: Dōnglóng Gōng; Pe̍h-ōe-jī: Tang-liông-kiong) is one of the most prominent temple in Donggang Township, Pingtung County, Taiwan. The temple is dedicated to "Lord Wen" (Chinese: 溫王爺; pinyin: Wēn Wángyé; Pe̍h-ōe-jī: Un-ông-iâ. The word Wen is pronounced the same as "plague" in both Hokkien and Mandarin Chinese).

== History ==
The temple was originally built in 1706 in the fishing village of Yanpu, across the river from Donggang. However, it was then later damaged by a flood in 1790 which led to a relocation of the temple to Donggang in 1790. Then again, it was damaged by another flood in 1877. Reconstruction work at the current site started in 1884 and was completed in 1887.

== Activities ==
The temple organizes the Donggang King Boat Festival every three years on the 2nd, 5th, 8th and 11th year of the Lunisolar calendar.

== See also ==
- Wang Ye worship
- Chinese folk religion
- List of temples in Taiwan
- List of tourist attractions in Taiwan
