= Legislative draft for diverse families =

The legislative draft for diverse families refers to the draft law of the Republic of China (Taiwan) regarding amending the civil bill (law) involving marriage and family systems to promote gender equality. It originated from Taiwanese society's emphasis on issues related to gender equality in the 1990s. Later, during the Presidency of Ma Ying-jeou, social groups concerned about gender equality promoted the amendment of the law, which is a part of "Gender mainstreaming." With the implementation of some laws and policies that are relatively less controversial, issues under review are often summarized and commonly referred to as "diversity families". The content includes three bills such as the Marriage Equality Bill, the Partnership System Draft, and the Dependent System Draft. Currently, among them The legalization of same-sex marriage and the right to adopt children have attracted the most public attention and comments.The three drafts are independent of each other and were submitted to the Legislative Yuan for review at the same time. Among them, the marriage equality (including same-sex marriage) draft first obtained enough co-signatories from the legislators and passed the Reading (legislature) on October 25, 2013, and was handed over to the judiciary. and the Legislative Affairs Commission's review, the draft partnership system and the draft family system are still in the stage of private initiative.

In late October 2016, legislator Yu Mei-nu led the proposal of the marriage equality bill for the second time. It was co-signed by the New Power Party, as well as some legislators from the Kuomintang and the Democratic Progressive Party, and was able to exceed the proposal threshold of 15 people. Each version of the bill passed the Reading (legislature) at the Legislative Yuan on November 8 and 11 of the same year and was sent to the committee.

== Related conceptual issues and world trends ==
- Gender equality and gender mainstreaming
- Same-sex marriage legalized
- In the Yeh Yung-chih incident that occurred in 2000, a male student died because he was not sent to the hospital early. It was later believed that the student was bullied by his classmates because of his gender expression and did not dare to go to the toilet during get out of class time. This led to the implementation of the Gender Equity Education Act (Taiwan), which was subsequently and further renamed the Gender Equality Education Act.
- Adjustment of the ratio of male to female toilets, popularization of lactation rooms, protection of male parental leave, Unisex public toilet
- Different sexual orientations and basic human rights

== The legal basis of the draft ==
- United Nations International Bill of Human Rights.
  - Among them, the "International Covenant on Economic, Social and Cultural Rights" and "International Covenant on Civil and Political Rights" are both legally binding.
- Constitution of the Republic of China Article 7 (Right to Equality) - All people of the Republic of China, regardless of gender, religion, race, class, or party affiliation, are equal in law.
- The current Civil Law of the Republic of China Article 972 - The marriage contract shall be concluded by the male and female parties themselves.

== History ==
=== During the Ma Ying-jeou administration ===
On August 11, 2012, the Taiwan Friendship Rights Promotion Alliance (referred to as the "Friends Alliance") completed the draft amendment to the Civil Code.

On September 8, 2012, the Friendship Alliance launched the "Diversity Family, I Support" signature campaign. At that time, the Friendship Alliance expected that in September 2013, millions of people would sign, Taiwan's first diversity policy independently drafted by the private sector. The draft amendment to the Family Civil Code was sent to the Legislative Yuan.

On November 19, 2013, the Legislative Yuan held a public hearing on the legalization of same-sex and transgender marriages. During the meeting, the pros and cons put forward their respective arguments. Among them, lawyer Ren Xiuyan, a representative of the Taiwan Religious Group Alliance to Protect the Family (referred to as the "Protecting the Family") said: "Only a biologically related child can love him, but an adopted child cannot love him." This triggered strong criticism from supporters.

On November 24, 2013, the Hualien Happy Families Alliance opposed the "diversity family" draft promoted by the Taiwan Couple Rights Promotion Alliance and held a demonstration in the sixth phase of redistricting to express their position. They believed that revising the monogamous marriage and family adoption systems would Impact traditional family ethics and morals and affect the happiness of the next generation. I hope to defend traditional family ethics through actions and oppose the amendment of the law.

On November 30, 2013, anti-diversity families and other groups, led by the "Next Generation Happiness Alliance", called on nearly 300,000 people to hold a "Praise for Next Generation Happiness" event on Ketagalan Boulevard to "defend marriage" and " Slogans such as "MADE BY Daddy+Mommy" and "Anti-Amending Civil Code 972" express opposition to diverse families. Groups such as the "Partners Alliance" that support diverse families used "marriage equality" as the slogan and typesetting in the Qunxian Building of the Legislative Yuan to express their support for the demands of plural families and gay marriage for "free love, equal family formation". At the same time, in order to express their support for the demands, groups such as the Tong-Kwang Light House Presbyterian Church and Hong Kong Keen House broke into the event venue on Ketagalan Avenue that had been applied for by the "Next Generation Happiness Alliance". The event staff did not comply with the "Assemblies and Parades" Act to persuade people to leave and restrict the physical presence of groups expressing support for their demands in a circle. Freedom; After the news leaked out in the media and social networks, there were two extreme reactions. Opponents of the law amendment believed that it was unwise to trespass into gathering places with different stances, while supporters believed that the Tong-Kwang Light House Presbyterian Church had applied to the local branch to hold placards and restricted support. The person's personal freedom was suspected of being excessively enforced.

On December 2, 2013, student unions and student groups in many colleges and universities jointly launched a national student coalition to support same-sex marriage by forming the Student Alliance (Students United Front for Same-Sex Marriage) and expressed their support for amending the Civil Code. Article 972 and issued a joint statement.

On December 3, 2013, at an anti-diversity event held on Ketagalan Avenue on November 30, a marcher wore a Nazi military uniform and said, "I am against homosexuality, and the Nazi Party are also anti-gay. That's why I wear this on the streets”, which attracted the attention of the Israel Economic and Cultural Office in Taipei and raised serious concerns with the Ministry of Foreign Affairs (Taiwan). At the same time, the Israeli representative office issued a statement on Facebook.

On December 22, 2013, singer A-Mei held a free concert in support of marriage equality on the Huashan 1914 Creative Park and Creative Park at her own expense and declined sponsorship. The concert was named "Love is the Only" and only required " Enter with love." Zhang Huimei expressed her position on the stage: "First, respect love, second, respect everyone's love, and third, support true love." It was estimated that 20,000 people came to the scene.

On December 18, 2014, singer Jolin Tsai released the MV for "So So What". The content was adapted from a true story. It described a same-sex couple who was unable to sign a consent form for surgery because they did not have the protection of legal status, expressing her support for same-sex marriage.

On December 22, 2014, the Judiciary and Legal Affairs Committee of the Legislative Yuan, under the leadership of rotating chairman Yu Mei-nu, scheduled for the first time to review the marriage equality draft. This is the first time in the history of an East Asian country that a marriage equality bill has been considered in Congress. However, the Ministry of Justice is opposed to the same-sex marriage bill. Chen Ming-tang, Parliamentary Secretary of the Ministry of Justice, raised objections, while Wu Xiuzhen, deputy director of the Gender Equality Division of the Executive Yuan, expressed approval and believed that the Ministry of Justice (Taiwan) should study the revision of the Civil law (common law) and the formulation of special laws. Relevant supporting equipment; other legislative statements Members,Tuan Yi-kang, Yu Mei-nv, Cheng Li-chun, and Lin Shu-fen spoke in agreement, while Liao Zhengjing and Lu Xuezhang opposed; Li Gui-min and Lin Hung-chih did not clearly express their approval or objection; the final meeting did not reach a specific conclusion. Chairman You Meili announced the end of the meeting, and the future The agenda will be rearranged as appropriate.

On May 20, 2015, the Kaohsiung City Government accepted the registration of “same-sex couples” in the household registration system. Since then, Taipei City has opened applications on June 17, 2015, and Taichung City Government has opened applications on October 1, 2015. Tainan City, Taoyuan City, New Taipei City, Chiayi City, Changhua County, Hsinchu County, and Yilan County also followed suit in 2016. This measure does not have legal effect, but a certification document will be issued, which can be used for medical and legal identification of related parties or proof of relationship. In October 2015, Taipei City set a national precedent for joint weddings, allowing same-sex couples to participate for the first time.

In August 2015, the "Partner Alliance Lawyers Group" was appointed by Qi Jiawei to formally submit the case of same-sex couples to register their marriage to the Supreme Court for constitutional interpretation. In addition, the Taipei High Administrative Court and the Taipei City Government will also submit their case to the Justice Call for an interpretation of the constitution on same-sex marriage.

On December 10, 2015, the Alliance for Marriage and more than 30 civil society organizations that care about marriage equality jointly launched the "Marriage Equality Legislators Connection", inviting legislative candidates to become sponsors or sponsors of the marriage equality draft after entering the Legislative Yuan. Co-signer. The New Power Party, the Green Party Social Democratic Alliance, the Free Taiwan Party, and the Trees Party all-party candidates support it. The Democratic Progressive Party, the Kuomintang, The Democratic Progressive Party, the People First Party (Taiwan), and the Taiwan Solidarity Union each support several candidates. The Faith and Hope League, which launched a referendum petition in an attempt to block marriage equality, was unwilling to reply after receiving the letter of commitment.

=== During the Tsai Ing-wen administration ===
August 1, 2016, Love is the greatest·In fact, we are all the same! The marriage equality charity concert brought together singers such as A-Lin, Zhang Huimei, Dee Hsu, Hebe Tien, Rainie Yang, Jolin Tsai, Elva Hsiao, Jam Hsiao, Show Lo, Soda Green, Sandy Lam, Mayday (Taiwanese band), HUSH and other singers to sing for marriage equality, hoping to awaken the outside world to pay attention to marriage. Affirmative action.

In late October 2016, the marriage equality bill proposed for the second time, led by legislator You Meimei, was co-signed by the Power of the Times caucus, as well as some KMT and DPP legislators, and exceeded the proposal threshold of 15 people. Each version of the bill passed the first reading in the House of Representatives on November 8 and November 11 respectively and was sent to the committee.

On December 26, 2016, the Judiciary Committee passed the review and completed the first reading and sent it to the party group for consultation.

On March 24, 2017, the Justices of the Judicial Yuan convened the Constitutional Court to conduct an oral debate on the petitioner Qi Jiawei and the Taipei City Government's same-sex marriage constitutional interpretation case. Justice Tang Dezong raised a procedural issue during the debate, saying that the Legislative Yuan is reviewing relevant drafts. The representative system of the Legislative Yuan has the power and obligation to prioritize the issue of same-sex marriage. Is it appropriate for the justice to intervene in the legislative mechanism at this time?

== Content ==
=== Marriage equality (including same-sex marriage) bill ===
The Friendship Alliance believes that Article 7 of the Constitution of the Republic of China stipulates that all people are equal under the law regardless of gender, religion, race, class, or party affiliation. However, the civil law stipulates that marriage should be decided by the male and female parties themselves, which lacks protection for different sexual orientations, genders. recognized marital rights, therefore the law should be revised.

In the draft of Marriage Equality (including same-sex marriage), the current description of marriage and family in the Civil Code has been revised from male and female to two persons, for example, changing husband and wife to spouse, so that the law can recognize in addition to Protects the marriage relationship between men and women, also extends to homosexuals and transgender people marriages between genders, gender changes, etc., and the age limit for making a marriage contract will be changed from men and women to 17 years old, and the age limit for marriage will also be changed from men and women to 18 years old, in addition In addition, there are no changes in this bill to the other civil law rights and obligations of the parties to a marriage.

=== Draft companionship system ===
The Partnership Alliance believes that marriage is not the only ideal form of forming a family and establishing an intimate relationship. In order to allow people who do not want to marry to have a legal choice to start a family, there is now a partnership system that is in line with Taiwan's national conditions. As long as two people are over twenty years old and have not been subject to Anyone with guardianship or auxiliary declaration, regardless of gender, can sign a partnership contract and establish a family.

This bill is based on the civil unions that were amended and passed in France in 1999 (before same-sex marriage was legalized in France in 2013, the French government protected the rights of same-sex couples). It is a Civil law (common law) by adults of both parties to live together, and excludes consanguinity, and Agree when The parties can only choose between the marriage system and the partnership system. The basic spirit is equal negotiation, care and mutual assistance. In principle, the legal status of both parties who form a partnership is roughly the same as that of the spouses in marriage. The difference from the marriage system lies in the way of starting a family that does not require human sexual activity relations as a necessary condition. A way to start a family where relationships are a necessary condition. If there is no agreement between the two parties in the partnership, they will adopt a separate property system and can negotiate inheritance rights. There is no obligation of sexual loyalty and no crime of adultery. They can apply for civil compensation and can jointly adopt children. The contract can be terminated unilaterally, and both parties still need to negotiate after the termination. Rights and obligations such as legal guardian and visitation.

== Dependent system draft ==
A family member is a relationship between two or more people with the purpose of living together permanently. The current definition of family members in the Civil Law of the Republic of China refers to non-kinship who live together for the purpose of permanently living together. In practice, it only applies to concubines and Legitimacy (family law) of wedlock during the Japanese colonial period. The draft family system is modified to a registration system, allowing substantial family members to register. People with spouses need to register jointly with their spouses. They have no inheritance rights, but can make arrangements according to wills. If there are no in-Affinity (law), no joint adoption or the right to adopt the other party's children, they can be unilaterally terminated. Agreement. This draft breaks the past concept of family, which is not limited to blood relations or in-laws, but focuses on current life care, emotional connection, and sharing of life, such as families of unrelated friends, patient groups, spiritual groups, etc. Anyone can start a family and obtain legal recognition after registering with the household registration authority.

== Debate ==
=== Supporters ===
The supporters are mainly those who support marriage equality. Regarding the partnership system or the family system, there are those who agree with it, while there are also those who choose to remain neutral, have doubts, and wait and see without taking a position. Civil society groups that participate in and promote “diversified families” are mainly gender groups and human rights advocacy organizations.

=== organize ===
- Taiwan Alliance to Promote Civil Partnership Rights
- Taiwan Gay and Lesbian Family Rights Promotion Association
- Taiwan Tongzhi Hotline Association
- Taiwan Base Association (Taichung Base, Haowo, Taichung Marriage Equality Bee)
- Student Front (Students United Front Supporting Same-Sex Marriage)

=== Co-sign ===
At present, more than 50 people from professional fields have launched a petition for marriage equality, including judges, lawyers, police, teachers, social workers, psychologists, doctors, literary circles, religious circles, art circles, academia, etc. Propose supporting viewpoints in their respective fields

=== Business world ===
- Tong Zixian, Chairman of Pegatron Technology
- Google Taiwan
- HP

=== Opposition ===
Most of the opponents are opposed to the draft system design.

- Faith and Hope League

=== Su Tseng-chang ===
In 2013 Kao Chun-ming and many religious figures visited Su Zhenchang to hope that he would oppose the bill on plural family formation: it was reported that Su Zhenchang expressed his support for the legalization of same-sex marriage in person and hoped that society would respect the existence of differences. [58]

=== Ko Wen-je ===
In an interview in 2014, Mayor of Taipei Ko Wen-je said on same-sex marriage: "I am not opposed to it, but on this issue, I will abstain from voting".

Later, on February 17, he participated in a closed meeting of a gender group and after understanding the actual content of the bill, he expressed his support for amending the law[60][61]. At the end of the year, he said: "The correct way to put it is that I have no objection and am optimistic about its success. What do I do?" [62] In 2015, Ke Wenzhe solemnized the marriage of gay couples and said: "Just be normal and bless everyone anyway. That's fine. As long as they live a happy life, it doesn't matter what they do." [63]

=== Ma Ying-jeou ===
During the 2008 Taiwanese presidential election, former President Ma Ying-jeou stated that "the issue of marriage involves the revision of civil laws and social consensus. He hopes to arrange appropriate occasions for dialogue, generate consensus and understanding, and gradually change. He will be cautious and respectful towards gay marriage." When interviewed at the end of 2013, he believed that "the institution of marriage has been a very important institution for mankind for thousands of years. Any adjustments and changes must have a high degree of consensus to be successful. The government will carefully exchange opinions with all parties".

=== Frank Hsieh ===
During the 2008 presidential election, Frank Hsieh said, "I have always respected human rights and believe that love should not be blocked. The concept of partners and marriage is diverse and acceptable." and other parts". When interviewed at the end of 2013, he believed that "from a cultural theory point of view, love, no matter what kind of love, family and marriage are now diversified, and gay love is also a kind of love. Basically, we respect it, but the social opinion is Pluralistic, the DPP has no formal discussion in this regard".

=== Eric Chu ===
During the 2016 presidential election, Eric Chu said about same-sex marriage, "Many sources of pressure now come from comparisons with the United States. The United States also spent 20 or 30 years promoting the gay rainbow movement from the states to the whole country. Taiwan It has only been discussed in recent years that... we need to face it with a rational and open attitude, start with respect, and finally accept it. It is definitely not a black and white attitude." When asked by the Women's New Knowledge Foundation, it stated: "We support the rights of partners. We will deal with the issue of same-sex marriage equality in stages"

=== James Soong ===
During the 2016 presidential election, James Soong said, "There is no consensus on the issue of diverse families in Taiwan society today, but respecting the rights of various groups to express their voices and tolerating the existence of various opinions is a concrete manifestation of Taiwan's freedom and democratic spirit. It is also a place of pride”. And “his position must not only respect everyone's emotional world, but also believe that it must be legally protected”.

=== Tsai Ing-wen ===
Tsai Ing-wen made a support video during the 2016 presidential election: "Before love, everyone is equal. I am Tsai Ing-wen, and I support marriage equality. Let everyone be free to love and pursue happiness".

=== Lai Ching-te ===
Lai Ching-te announced on January 27, 2016 that Tainan City will accept applications for partnership annotation certificates from same-sex couples, and may also, upon their request, have their partnership annotated in other fields in their household registration transcripts. It also called on the Legislative Yuan to enact legislation as soon as possible to include same-sex couples in institutional protections to ensure and respect their human rights.

=== Hung Hsiu-chu ===
When Hung Hsiu-chu ran for the 2016 presidential election, she said: "I support that all people who love each other should be protected by the law. Heterosexuality is the structure of the family. She is willing to form dialogue and communication. Can homosexuals get married? It involves destroying the family system, needs to go through dialogue, and will not object immediately, but will work hard in this direction." "Sister Zhuzhu supports all people who love each other. Sister Zhuzhu will persist in working hard to promote communication and seek consensus."

=== Huang Kuo-chang ===
Huang Kuo-chang once wrote in Apple Daily: "The bill on diverse families has become a major controversy that has caused high levels of social antagonism. Taiwanese society still needs more efforts to resolve misunderstandings and conflicts so that citizens who choose same-sex couples are the same as those who choose opposite-sex couples. Have the right to pursue family happiness and legal protection fairly” “Don't regard homosexuality as God's fault, because, regardless of whether God exists, there is nothing wrong with choosing to pursue a happy life with the person you love.”

=== Su Beng ===
Shi Ming, the founder of the Taiwan Independence Association, said: "I can't imagine same-sex love! But whether you want to get married or not is a personal freedom!" "No shadow! This is because many Taiwanese people do not have a good understanding of what is Human rights? What is freedom?”

== Refer to ==
- Civil union
- LGBTQ rights in Taiwan
- Polyamory
- Same-sex marriage in Taiwan
