= Philanthropy of Jolin Tsai =

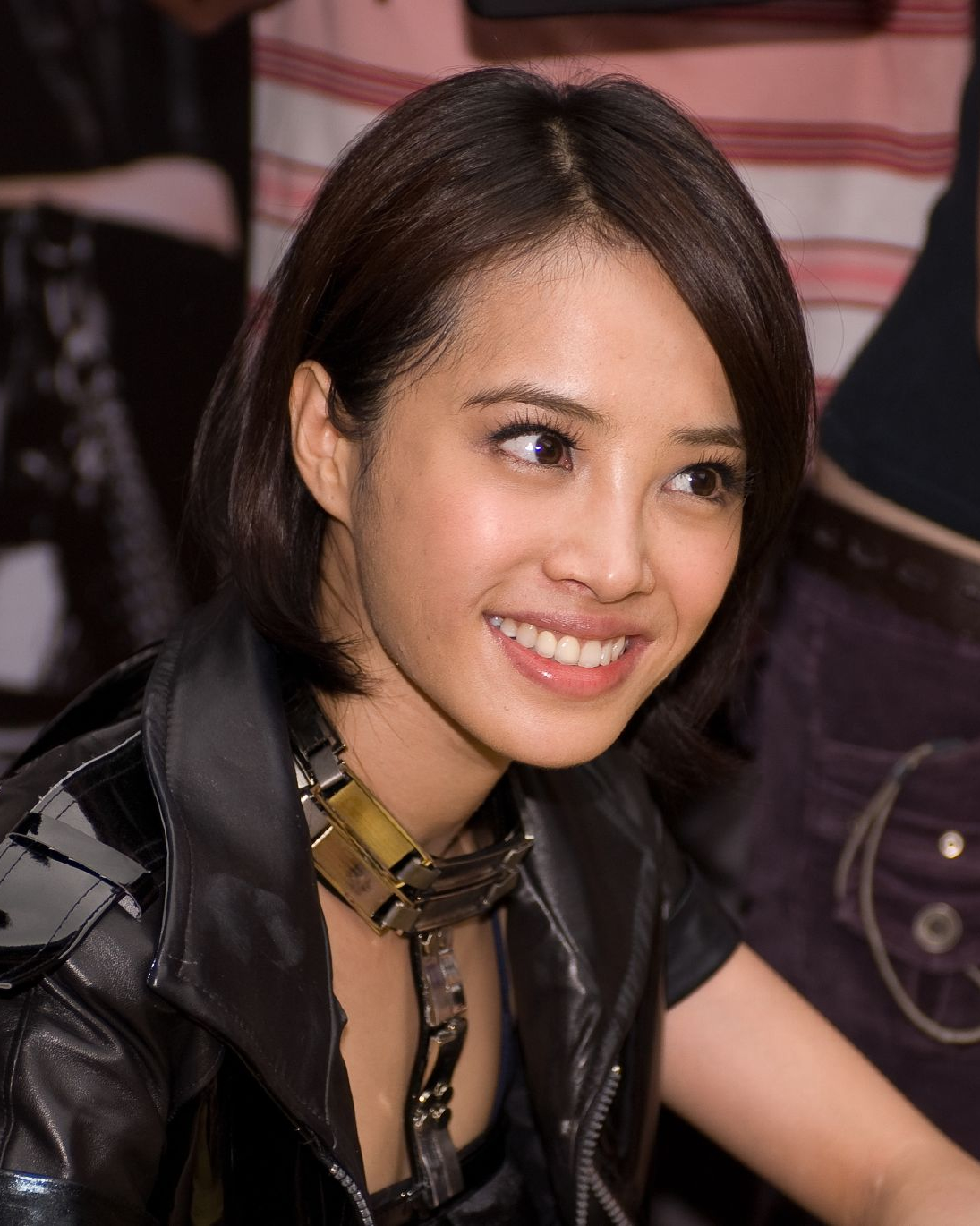
Tsai in 2007

Taiwanese singer Jolin Tsai has been actively involved in charitable endeavors, frequently providing assistance through donations and other means during natural disasters in her home country and neighboring countries. She has also been a passionate advocate for various social causes, including children's and youth rights, elder rights, women's rights, LGBTQ rights, disability rights, animal rights, and public health and safety.

== Charitable assistance ==
=== 1990s ===
- In September 1999, Taiwan was struck by the 1999 Jiji earthquake. Tsai donated the proceeds from the autograph session for her album 1019 to disaster relief efforts. The music video for the album's song "Living with the World" featured footage of post-earthquake rescue operations and was created as a tribute to the support provided by various sectors of society during the crisis.

=== 2000s ===
- In May 2003, during the global Severe Acute Respiratory Syndrome (SARS) outbreak, Tsai, along with 85 other artists, performed the charity song "Hand in Hand".
- In May 2003, Tsai, representing the 86 artists who contributed to the song, visited Taiwan Centers for Disease Control (CDC) to express her gratitude to healthcare workers, donating 100,000 copies of the single "Hand in Hand" as a gesture of support.
- In December 2004, Tsai anonymously donated funds to several charitable organizations for relief efforts following the 2004 Indian Ocean earthquake and tsunami.
- In January 2005, Tsai participated in the "Sending Love to South Asia" charity telethon organized by Azio TV, where she also made a personal donation.
- In May 2008, Tsai, together with friends, donated RMB ¥1 million for the relief efforts following the 2008 Sichuan earthquake.
- In May 2008, Tsai participated in the "Sending Love to Sichuan" fundraising telethon organized by China Television (CTV).
- In July 2008, Tsai was invited by World Vision Taiwan to endorse the "30-Hour Famine" campaign. She visited several affected areas in Sichuan Province, including Yuanba Town, Yangmu Town, and Malu Township, to offer her condolences and support.
- In August 2009, after the Typhoon Morakot disaster in Taiwan, Tsai, together with friends, donated NT$3 million to assist with relief efforts.

=== 2010s ===
- In April 2010, Tsai participated in a charity concert held at Workers' Stadium in Beijing, where she called for support in rebuilding education infrastructure in the 2010 Yushu earthquake-stricken region. All proceeds from the concert were donated to China Red Cross Foundation to fund educational relief projects in both Yushu and Wenchuan earthquake areas.
- In March 2011, Tsai, together with her management company, donated USD $50,000 for disaster relief following the 2011 Tōhoku earthquake and tsunami.
- In April 2013, Tsai donated RMB ¥1 million to assist with relief efforts after the 2013 Lushan earthquake.
- In July 2013, Tsai contributed an additional RMB ¥150,000 through Sichuan Charity Federation to support the rebuilding of elementary schools in the Lushan earthquake-affected areas.
- In August 2014, Tsai donated NT$2 million to aid victims of the 2014 Kaohsiung gas explosions, with NT$1 million directed towards supporting rescue operations for police officers and firefighters, and the remaining NT$1 million used to assist affected civilians.
- In February 2018, Tsai donated NT$1 million to support relief efforts following the 2018 Hualien earthquake.

=== 2020s ===
- In January 2020, amid the outbreak of the COVID-19 pandemic in China, Tsai donated RMB ¥1 million to support relief efforts.
- In April 2020, during the global spread of the COVID-19 pandemic, Tsai was invited to perform the charity song "Fight as One" alongside Eason Chan for Yunnan Television, aiming to raise awareness and encourage collective action against the pandemic.
- In May 2021, when Taiwan experienced a surge in COVID-19 cases, Tsai donated NT$1 million through Taipei City Department of Social Welfare to support the purchase of Taiwan's first smart temperature-controlled meal box machine for Wanhua Social Welfare Service Center, helping to provide safe and nutritious meals to those in need during the crisis.

== Public interest ==
=== 2000s ===
- In November 2003, Tsai was invited by Ronald McDonald House Charities to serve as an ambassador, urging the public to help children receiving treatment away from home and to donate to the construction of the "Ronald McDonald Family Rooms".
- In March 2004, Tsai was invited by 7-Eleven and John Tung Foundation to endorse the "Depressed Youth: Towards the Sunshine" campaign, calling for public support to help depressed adolescents regain a positive outlook on life and overcome their emotional struggles.
- In June 2004, Tsai was invited by Hong Kong Alzheimer's Disease Association to participate in a charity concert, raising awareness of the issues surrounding elderly care and dementia.
- In June 2004, Tsai donated RM 50,000 from the proceeds of her album Castle autograph session in Kuching, Malaysia, to Batu Kawa Min Lit Secondary School in Malaysia to support its educational funding.
- In November 2004, Tsai donated all the proceeds from the first 100 tickets sold for her J1 World Tour concert in Taipei, as well as NT$50 from each additional ticket sold, to Ronald McDonald House Charities.
- In April 2005, Tsai was invited by Taipei City Department of Social Welfare, Taipei City Police Department, and Taipei City Department of Health, along with Child Welfare League Foundation and Caring for Taiwan Foundation, to endorse the "Save Our Children—Stop Abuse" campaign, urging the public to prevent child abuse and raise awareness about child protection.
- In July 2005, Tsai was invited by UNICEF and Nickelodeon to promote the "Nick 2015" initiative, encouraging countries around the world to implement child protection policies.
- In November 2006, Tsai donated NT$50 from each ticket sold for three performances of her Dancing Forever World Tour in Taipei to Ronald McDonald House Charities. The total donation exceeded NT$10 million.
- In April 2008, Tsai was invited by Taiwan's Ministry of Health and Welfare and John Tung Foundation to endorse the "2008 Quit & Win" campaign, encouraging the public to quit smoking.
- In August 2008, Tsai was appointed as an ambassador by Taiwan's Ministry of Health and Welfare and John Tung Foundation, calling for the full implementation of smoking bans in indoor workplaces.
- In April 2009, Tsai was appointed as an ambassador by Red Heart Association, urging the public to support children from disadvantaged families.
- In May 2009, Tsai was invited by Child Welfare League Foundation to endorse the "Let Love Soar" campaign, encouraging society to provide employment opportunities for unemployed mothers.

=== 2010s ===
- In April 2010, Tsai was invited by Taiwan's Ministry of Health and Welfare and John Tung Foundation to endorse the "2010 Quit & Win" campaign, encouraging the public to quit smoking.
- In September 2010, Tsai was invited by Sunshine Social Welfare Foundation to endorse the "Sunshine Project", urging the public to show respect and care for people with facial disfigurements.
- In April 2011, Tsai was invited by Maria Social Welfare Foundation to serve as an ambassador, calling on the public to help children with physical and mental disabilities at remote elementary schools.
- In April 2014, Tsai participated in the Project WAO Concert, which raised awareness about helping abused young girls. All proceeds from the concert were donated to City People Foundation to support the "Sunflower Vitality Project".
- In October 2014, Tsai was invited by Child Welfare League Foundation to endorse the "Help Me Grow, Help Me Find a Home" campaign, encouraging the public to donate and adopt children in need.
- In May 2015, Tsai designed bandage stickers for a charity sale, with all proceeds donated to Taiwan Alliance to Promote Civil Partnership Rights to support the legalization of same-sex marriage.
- In September 2015, Tsai was invited by Taiwan Foundation for the Blind to serve as an ambassador, calling on the public to help people with visual disabilities in a correct and supportive manner.
- In October 2015, Tsai designed 1,000 fondant cakes for a charity sale, with all proceeds donated to Taiwan Alliance to Promote Civil Partnership Rights.
- In March 2016, Tsai was invited by Taipei City Department of Education to endorse the "Gender-Friendly Restroom Installation Pilot Project", advocating for gender equality in education.
- In August 2016, Tsai participated in the Love Is King, It Makes Us All Equal Concert, with all proceeds donated to Taiwan Alliance to Promote Civil Partnership Rights.
- In September 2016, Tsai participated in the Bazaar Stars Charity Night, donating RMB ¥700,000 to Bazaar Charity Fund to support the "Siyuan—Bazaar Poverty Relief Project" to purchase ambulances for poverty-stricken regions in China.
- In May 2017, Tsai created a painting titled You, which was sold at auction, raising NT$200,000 for Taiwan Alliance to Promote Civil Partnership Rights.
- In June 2017, Tsai was invited by Taiwan AIDS Society, Taiwan AIDS Nurses Association, and Harmony Home Association to serve as an ambassador, encouraging the public to face HIV with a positive and proactive attitude.
- In September 2017, Tsai organized a charity auction, donating 13 of her personal treasured items. All proceeds from the auction were directed to Beijing IHearU Charity Fund's "Deaf Children's Assistance Program", which aims to provide cochlear implants for underprivileged children with hearing disabilities, helping them restore their hearing and improve their quality of life. The auction raised RMB ¥62,291 in donations from fans, and Tsai personally matched the amount with an additional RMB ¥437,708, bringing the total funds raised to RMB ¥500,000. These funds enabled six hearing-impaired children to receive cochlear implants and provided rehabilitation training for 15 other children with hearing disabilities.
- In October 2017, Tsai was invited by Fendi to design a handbag for the "Hong Kong Peekaboo Project" charity sale, with all proceeds donated to Prader-Willi Syndrome Association Taiwan.
- In December 2017, Tsai was invited by Huashan Social Welfare Foundation to endorse the "Love the Elderly, Love the Family Reunion" campaign, raising awareness about aging issues. She also donated NT$1 million to the foundation. Additionally, she made a personal donation of NT$1 million in 2016.
- In March 2018, Tsai was invited by People for the Ethical Treatment of Animals Asia to call on the public to reject the fur trade and animal entertainment industries.
- In July 2018, Tsai was invited by Taiwan Fund for Children and Families to endorse the "Infinite Generation" campaign, raising awareness about the learning difficulties faced by disadvantaged children.
- In October 2018, Tsai participated in the One Night for Children Concert, encouraging the public to support children with special needs. All proceeds from the concert were donated to charity.
- In August 2019, Tsai was invited again by Taiwan Fund for Children and Families to endorse the "Infinite Generation" campaign.
- In September 2019, Tsai was invited by Beijing Foundation for Elder and the Disabled to serve as an ambassador, urging the public to donate and provide long-term professional support for families with disabilities.
- In October 2019, Tsai was invited by Taiwan's Health Promotion Administration, K-12 Education Administration, and John Tung Foundation to serve as an ambassador, raising awareness about the harmful effects of tobacco products on health.

=== 2020s ===
- In December 2020, Tsai was invited by Taiwan Fund for Children and Families to endorse the "Infinite Generation" campaign.
- In August 2021, Tsai was again invited by Taiwan Fund for Children and Families to endorse the "Infinite Generation" campaign. She also donated NT$1 million to purchase 50 laptops for disadvantaged children in need of educational support.
- In March 2022, Tsai was invited by Taiwan Foundation for Rare Disorders to endorse the "Rare Disease Youth Education and Empowerment Program", urging the public to donate to create a more inclusive and supportive learning environment for children with rare diseases.
- In October 2023, Tsai was once again invited by Taiwan Foundation for Rare Disorders to endorse the "Rare Disease Youth Education and Empowerment Program", encouraging the public to contribute to the cause.
- In June 2024, Tsai collaborated with Levi's to launch a limited-edition denim jacket collection. The proceeds from the sales were donated to Shenzhen Social Commonweal Foundation, with the funds specifically allocated to support Aidafu Charity Dumpling Restaurant, which is the first inclusive restaurant in China, founded by individuals with severe rare diseases. The initiative raised a total of RMB ¥298,131.11. In Taiwan, the proceeds were donated to Taiwan Foundation for Rare Disorders, providing comprehensive services and holistic care for families affected by rare diseases. In Hong Kong, the proceeds were donated to Rare Disease Hong Kong, supporting public education programs aimed at raising awareness and increasing attention to rare diseases.
- In June 2024, Tsai collaborated with Pandora to launch a limited-edition jewelry set. The proceeds from the sales were donated to Beijing IHearU Charity Fund, supporting initiatives aimed at assisting the hearing-impaired community.
- In June 2024, Tsai collaborated with MAC to launch a limited-edition lipstick set. The proceeds from the sales were donated to charity organizations, supporting the education and skill development of girls from disadvantaged families.
- In July 2024, Tsai collaborated with Salomon to launch a limited-edition T-shirt collection. The proceeds from the sales were donated to Beijing Foundation for Elder and the Disabled, supporting vulnerable groups. The initiative raised a total of RMB ¥358,225.01.
- In August 2024, Tsai collaborated with AllSaints to launch a limited-edition leather jacket collection. The proceeds from the sales were donated to Beijing Foundation for Elder and the Disabled's "Caring for Girls, Blooming Towards the Sun" project, which provides support such as care packages and health education for girls in economically underdeveloped rural areas. The initiative raised a total of RMB ¥160,000. In Taiwan, the proceeds were donated to Taiwan Fund for Children and Families's "Infinite Generation" project, which aims to provide long-term assistance to children in need.
