= Taiwan TG Butterfly Garden =

Transgender support group in Taiwan

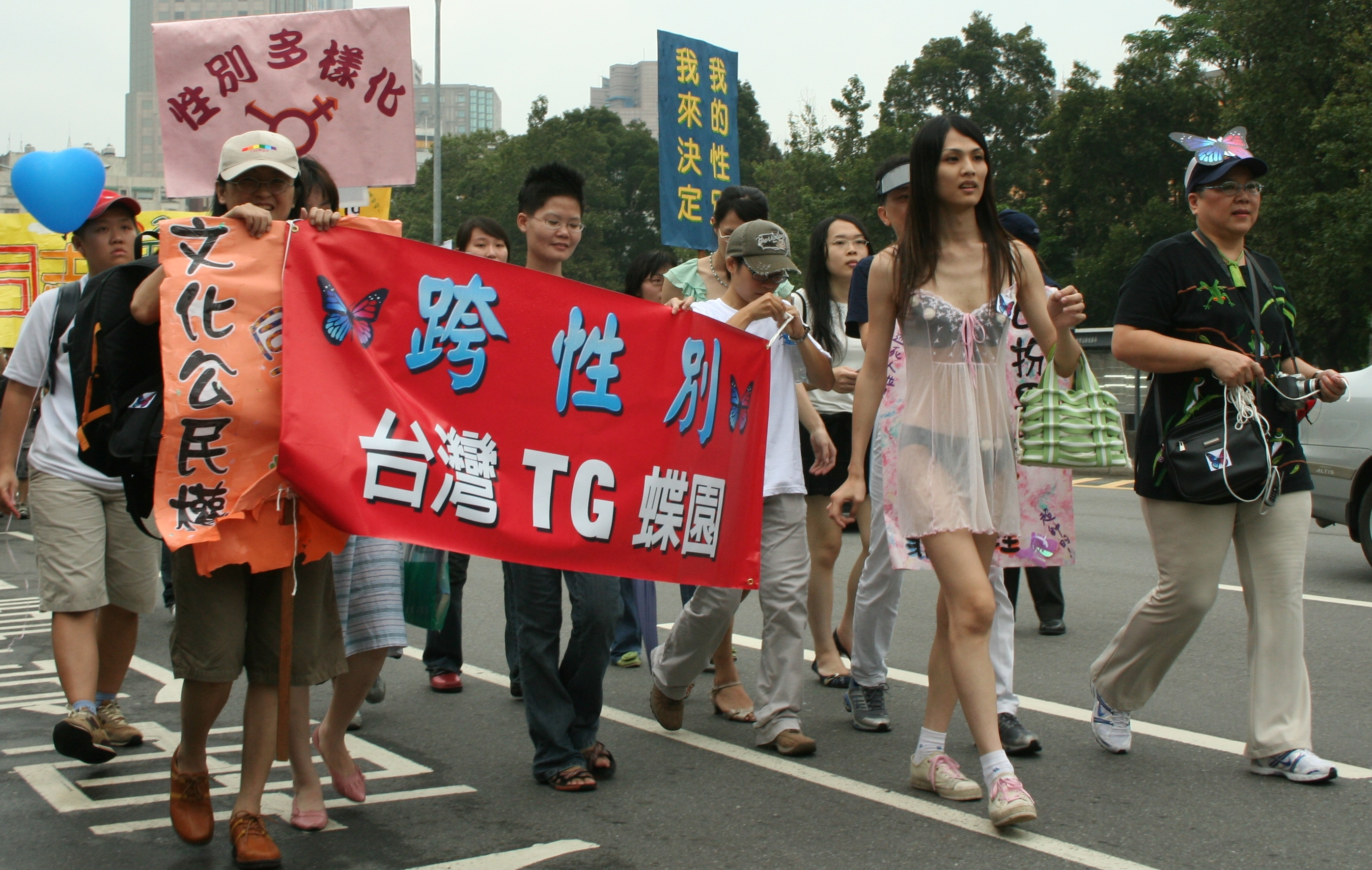
Taiwan TG Butterfly Garden at 2006 Taiwan Pride

Taiwan TG Butterfly Garden (Chinese: 台灣TG蝶園; pinyin: Táiwān TG diéyuán), established in 2000, is the first formal transgender support group in Taiwan. Many members are transsexual; others identify as crossdressers, and others might be described as questioning or transgressive.

The organization served as flag guards at 2005 Taiwan Pride, and demanded amendments for gender equality in employment law, along with the Awakening Foundation, Gender/Sexuality Rights Association Taiwan and Taiwan Tongzhi Hotline Association.

The name 'butterfly' was inspired by a mixed gender butterfly.

In 2017 the organization entered hibernation, but the Haori Transgender Hotline they had established back in 2008 continued to operate.

== See also ==
- LGBT rights in Taiwan
- List of LGBT rights organisations
