= Josephine Ho =

Taiwanese academic and feminist

- 何春蕤; Ho Chuen-juei
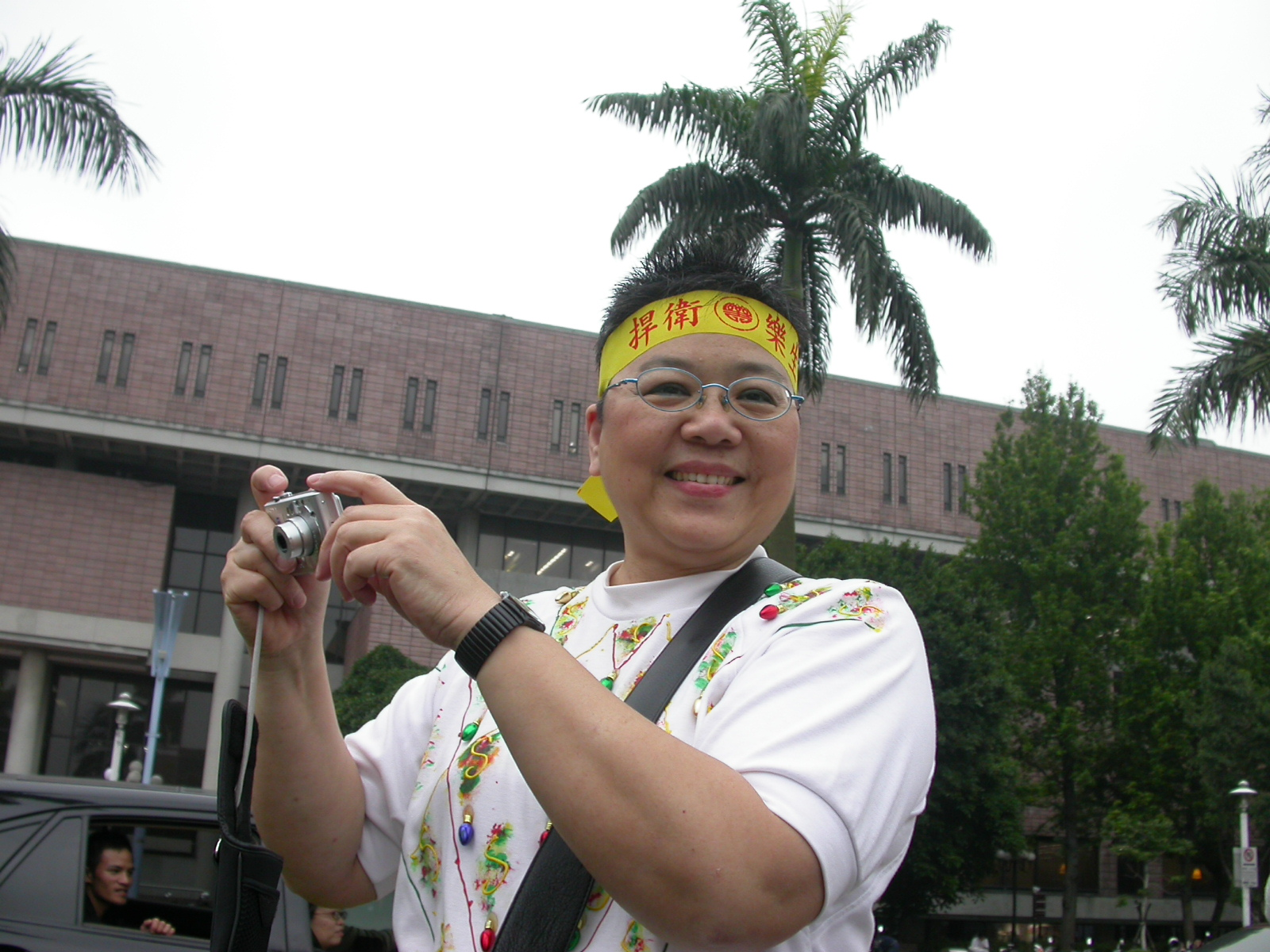
- Josephine Ho in 2007
- Born: 16 June 1951 (age 75); Taiwan
- Occupations: Academic, feminist
- Known for: Activism for sexual and reproductive health and rights, sex-positive feminism
- Spouse: Ning Yingbin 甯應斌

Academic background
- Education: National Chengchi University (BA); University of Pennsylvania (MS); University of Georgia (EdD); Indiana University Bloomington (PhD)

Academic work
- Discipline: Cultural studies
- Main interests: Sexuality
- Website: http://sex.ncu.edu.tw/members/Ho/index.htm

Josephine Ho
- Traditional Chinese: 何春蕤
- Simplified Chinese: 何春蕤
Transcriptions
Standard Mandarin
- Hanyu Pinyin: Hé Chūnruí
- Bopomofo: ㄏㄜˊ ㄔㄨㄣㄖㄨㄟˊ
- Wade–Giles: Ho Ch`un-jui
- Tongyong Pinyin: Hé Chūnrueí
Yue: Cantonese
- Jyutping: Ho^{4} Ceon^{1} jeoi^{4}
Southern Min
- Hokkien POJ: Hô Chhun-jôe

Josephine Chuen-juei Ho (Chinese: 何春蕤; born 16 June 1951) is a Taiwanese educator and academic. She is the chair of the English department of the National Central University, Taiwan, and coordinator of its Center For the Study of Sexualities. She is one of the most prominent feminist scholars in Taiwan.

== Education ==
Ho earned a Bachelor of Arts (B.A.) degree from National Chengchi University, a Master of Science (M.S.) degree from the University of Pennsylvania, and a Doctor of Education (Ed.D.) degree from the University of Georgia. She then earned a second doctorate, her Ph.D., from Indiana University Bloomington.

== Activism ==
As an activist, Ho has been drawing attention to women's rights in Taiwan since the 1990s. Though there were no laws criminalizing sexual harassment at the time, sexual assaults on women were increasingly reported in the news after the first legal case on sexual harassment was heard in 1989. In May 1994, Ho led Taiwan's first demonstration against sexual harassment, and devised its slogan, "We don't want sexual harassment, we want orgasms. If you keep sexually harassing us, we'll cut it off with a pair of scissors!"

=== Zoophilia webpage incident ===
In April 2003, an article appeared in the China Times claiming that Ho's website had several pages that covered the topic of zoophilia and actively promoted the practice, with images. 13 conservative groups collectively filed a complaint accusing Ho of making obscenities available to children. This sensationalism led to thirteen Christian and conservative organizations collectively filing a complaint with the Taipei District Court. The process lasted for over one year, with a not guilty ruling returned on 15 September 2004, because the zoophilia pages were only one part of the website's essays and reports. Thus the incorporation of some pictures did not constitute an obscenity.

The incident has been seen as an example of sensationalist media and received international attention as a perceived confrontation between conservative aspects of Taiwanese society and sexual freedom.

== Selected publications ==
- Ho, Josephine (2015). "Localized trajectories of queerness and activism under global governance". In Tellis, Ashley; Bala, Sruti (eds.). The Global Trajectoies of Queerness: Re-thinking Same-Sex Politics in the Global South. Leiden & Boston: Brill; Rodopi. pp. 121–136.
- Ho, Josephine (2014). "The perils of sexuality research in aspiring democracies". Sexualities. 17 (5/6): 677–680. doi:10.1177/1363460714531276. S2CID 147411901.
- Ho, Josephine (2005). "From anti-trafficking to social discipline: or, the changing role of "women's" NGOs in Taiwan". In Kempadoo, Kamala; Sanghera, Jyoti; Pattanaik, Bandana (eds.). Trafficking and Prostitution Reconsidered: New Perspectivess on Migration, Sex Work, and Human Rights (PDF). Boulder: Paradigm. pp. 83–105.
- He 何, Chunrui 春蕤 (1994). 豪爽女人: 女性主義與性解放 [The Gallant Woman--Feminism and Sexual Emancipation] (in Chinese). Taipei: Huangguan Wenxue Chuban.

== Honors and awards ==
- (2016) Professor Emeritus of National Central University, Taiwan.
- (2005) 1000 Women for the Nobel Peace Prize (nominated)
- (2004) Outstanding Research Award. National Central University, Taiwan.

== See also ==
- Taiwan TG Butterfly Garden
