= Suicide of Jacques Picoux =

Jacques Camille Picoux (9 November 1948 – 16 October 2016) was a lecturer on French language and literature at National Taiwan University who died by suicide on 16 October 2016. He held a solo artist's exhibition in 2012 and was also known for playing the character Kong Kong in the 2015 film The Assassin directed by Hou Hsiao-hsien.

== Impact on Taiwanese society ==
A prominent member of the LGBT community who had lived there since 1979, Picoux was 68 years old. His death generated a wave of public sympathy for the LGBT community, and catalyzed the Legislative Yuan to propose bills for the legalization of same-sex marriage in Taiwan. According to Picoux friends, he decided to end his life because he had no legal rights to make medical decisions on behalf of his cancer-stricken partner, Tseng Ching-chao, nor did he have any legal rights to the home they had shared for nearly 40 years. Tseng was the global agent of notable Chinese actress Gong Li.

Picoux's death led to criticisms of the newly elected President Tsai Ing-wen, who had campaigned on promises to legalize same-sex marriage. Public polls around the time showed that nearly three-quarters of the Taiwanese people supported same-sex marriage.

In 2019, Taiwan legalized same-sex marriage, and many people held a remembrance for Picoux at the time. Some groups in Taiwan have honoured him when advocating for LGBT rights in Taiwan, promising that there won't "be another Jacques Picoux"-like tragedy.

== Drafting of new legislation ==
LGBT rights advocates have said that there may now be a breakthrough in legislation, with an increase of support for same-sex marriage among members of the Legislative Yuan. Taiwanese Pride Watch activist Cindy Su says that "We actually can see that there are about 66 legislators who will probably vote yes on marriage equality", making it a majority of 58.4%.

Former Grand Justice Hsu Tzong-li has said that if it can be proved that homosexuals are a natural minority that have been misunderstood as abnormal, then it follows that the laws stating marriage is only between a man and a woman could be considered unconstitutional. Justice Hsu will become the nation's next Judicial Yuan President, after lawmakers approved his nomination in October 2016.

Yu Mei-nu, a member of the Democratic Progressive Party, has drafted a new law to be presented to legislators, and it may be passed as early as next year. If it does pass, Taiwan would be the first Asian country to legalise same-sex marriage. Homosexuality is considered taboo in many East Asian countries, and is illegal across much of South Asia.

President Tsai is an open supporter of same-sex marriage, and has said she would support any decision made by the parliament.

Same-sex marriage in Taiwan became legal on 24 May 2019. This made Taiwan the first nation in Asia to recognize same-sex marriage.

== LGBT rights in Taiwan ==
Taiwan is considered a very progressive society regarding gay rights, in a region where citizens of some countries can still be jailed for being gay. In December 2016, Taiwan's highest health authority announced plans to ban conversion therapy, which aims to change a person's sexual orientation. The Ministry of Health and Welfare said that the ban would take effect from March 2017.

However, Taiwanese author Chu Hsin-yi (瞿欣怡), has criticized Taiwan for "calling itself gay-friendly... while being unwilling to let loose, even a bit, regulations affecting gay rights."

Despite fervent campaigning from anti-LGBT rights groups, LGBT rights in Taiwan made a historic step forward in 2019 with the legalisation of same-sex marriage. Though there are still some things missing from the introduction of same-sex marriage, such as international spouses from countries that do not allow same-sex marriages to be performed being barred from marrying in Taiwan itself, it is viewed as a great move forward for LGBT rights in the region.
