= Taiwan Pride =

Annual LGBT pride parade in Taipei and other cities of the Republic of China

Taiwan Pride 臺灣同志遊行
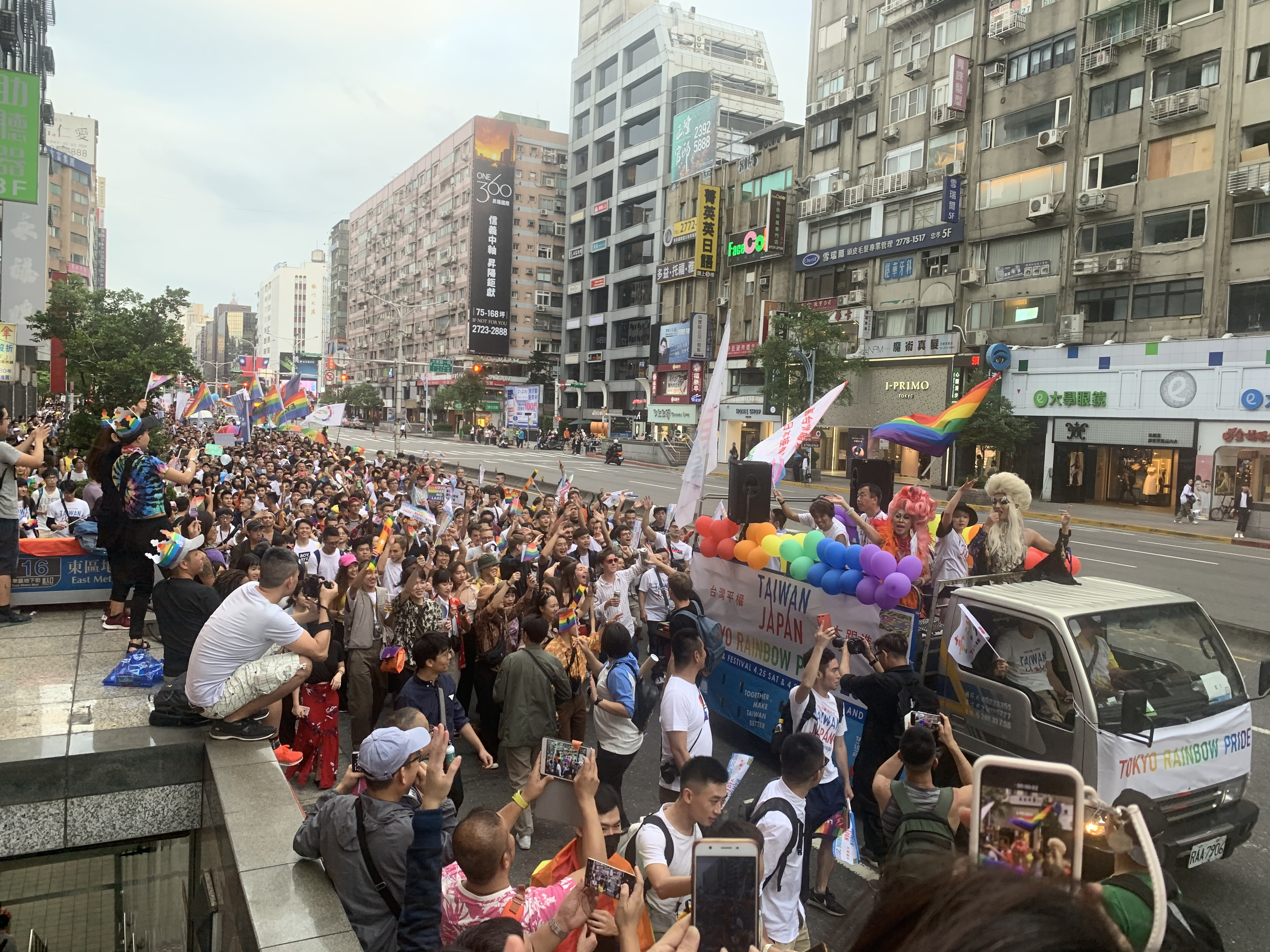
- Taiwan Pride in Taipei in 2019
- Location: Taipei
- Country: Taiwan
- Years active: 23
- Inaugurated: November 1, 2003
- Most recent: October 25, 2025
- Participants: More than 200,000 (2019)

Taiwan Pride
- Traditional Chinese: 臺灣同志遊行
- Simplified Chinese: 台湾同志游行
Transcriptions
Standard Mandarin
- Hanyu Pinyin: Táiwān Tóngzhì Yóuxíng

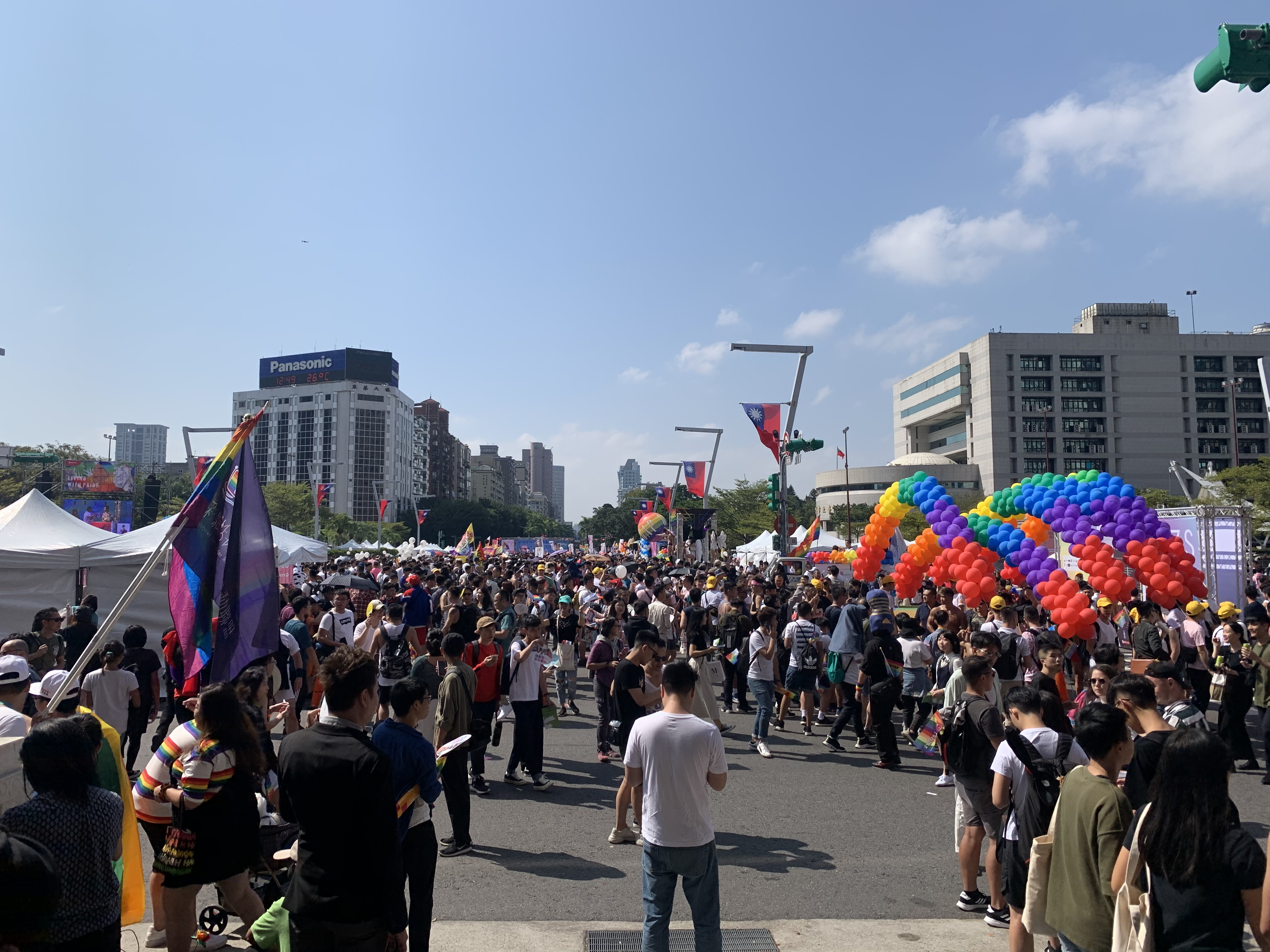
Taiwan Pride 2019 in Taipei

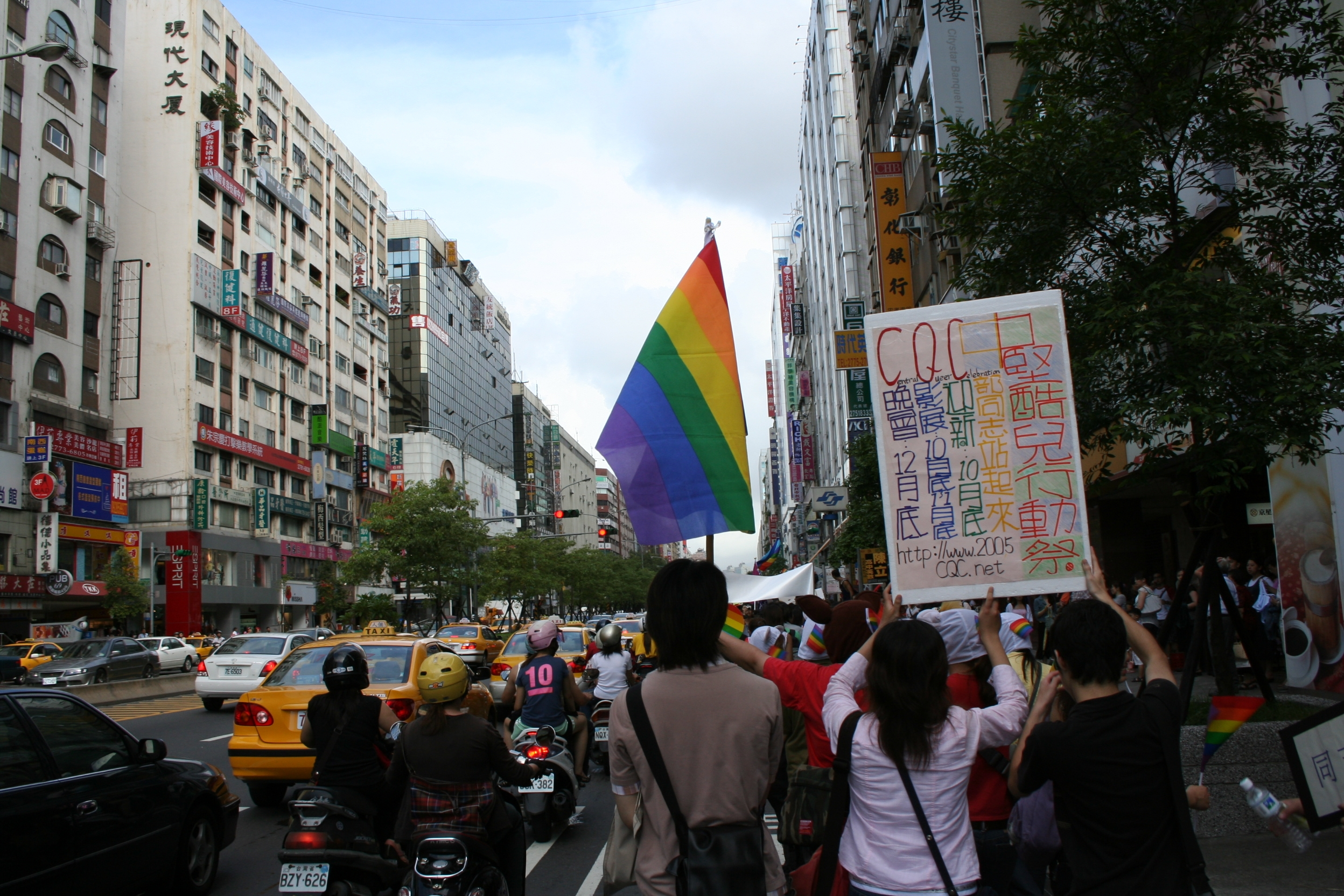
Taiwan Pride 2005 on Zhongxiao East Road in Taipei. The sign reads: "Central Queer Celebration" (a group).

Taiwan Pride (Chinese: 臺灣同志遊行) is the annual LGBTQ pride parade in Taiwan. The parade was first held in 2003. Although joined by groups from all over the country, the primary location has always been the capital city of Taipei. The parade held in October 2019 attracted more than 200,000 participants, making it the largest gay pride event in East Asia. As of 2019, it is the largest in Asia ahead of Tel Aviv Pride in Israel, which is the largest in the Middle East. (Note: As of June 2019, New York City’s NYC Pride March is North America’s biggest Pride parade. For Stonewall 50 – WorldPride NYC 2019 up to five million took part over the final weekend, with an estimated four million in attendance at the parade. São Paulo, Brazil’s event, Parada do Orgulho GLBT de São Paulo, is South America’s largest, and is listed by Guinness World Records as the world’s largest Pride parade starting in 2006 with 2.5 million people. They broke the Guinness record in 2009 with four million attendees. They have kept the title from 2006 to at least 2016. They had five million attend in 2017. As of 2019 it has three to five million each year. As of June 2019, Spain‘s Madrid Pride, Orgullo Gay de Madrid (MADO), is Europe’s biggest, it had 3.5 million attendees when it hosted WorldPride in 2017. As of June 2019 the largest LGBTQ events include: in Asia it is Taiwan Pride in Taipei, Taiwan; in the Middle East it is Tel Aviv Pride in Israel; in Oceania, it is Australia’s Sydney Mardi Gras Parade; in Africa it is South Africa’s Johannesburg Pride.) Taiwan LGBT Pride Community, the organizer of Taiwan LGBTQ Pride Parade, holds the parade on the last Saturday of October.

== Comparison with other pride parades ==
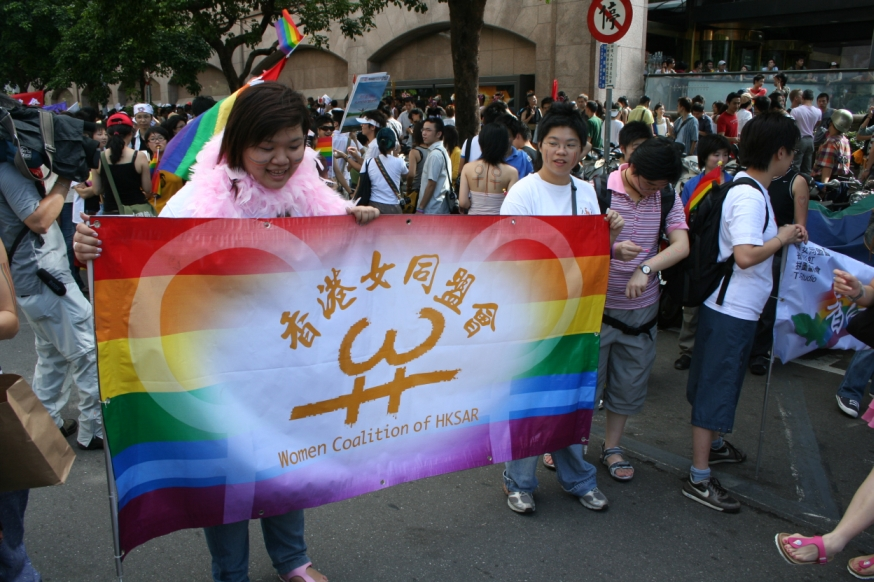
Women Coalition of HKSAR showing their support in the Taiwan Pride parade in Taipei in 2005.

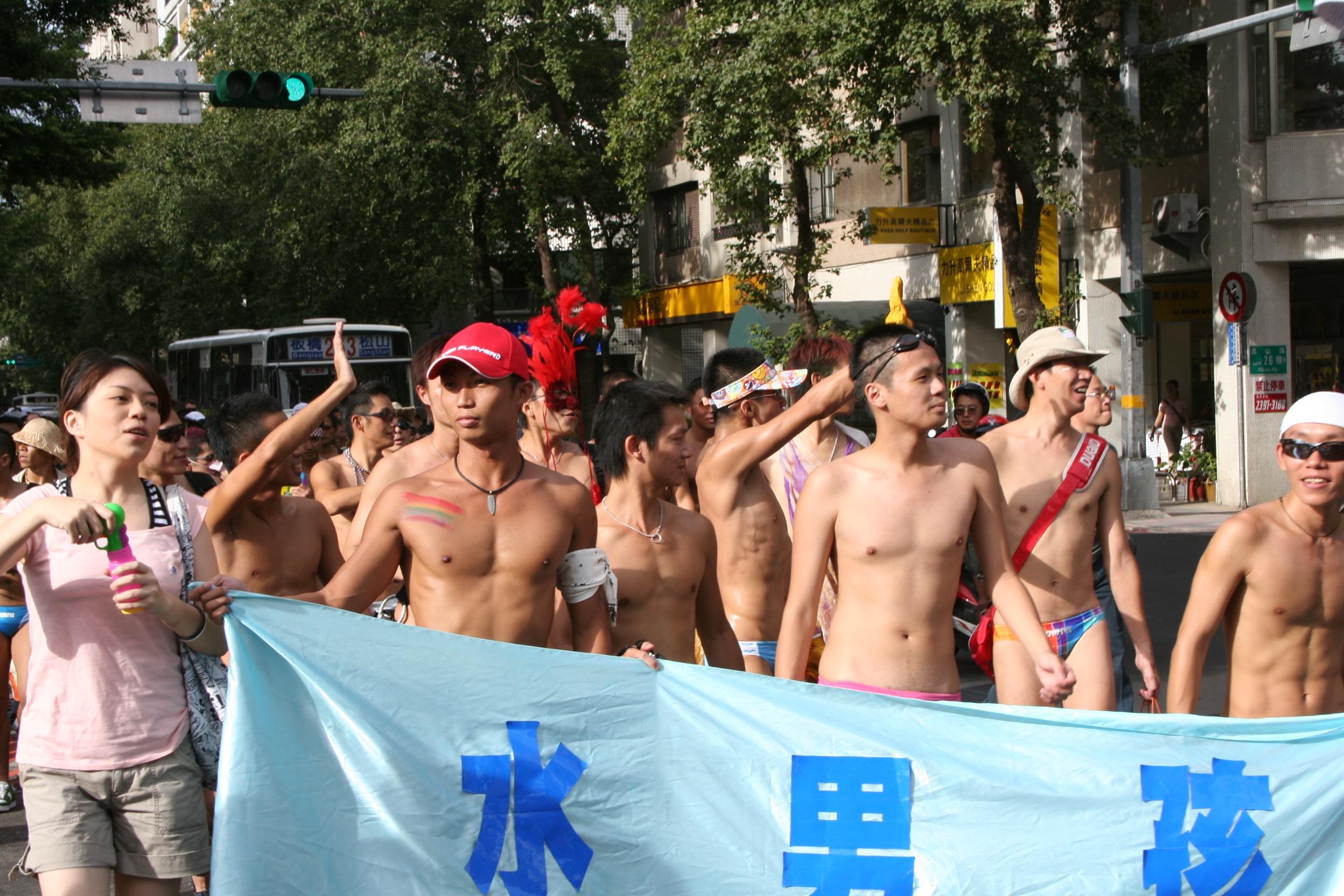
Water Boys

Taiwan Pride differs in many ways from gay pride parades held in the US and Europe. The parade foundation is one example. Western parades often show a divergence between social movements and "commercialization". Some pride parades are financed by corporations targeting gay customers, and sometimes the parade even becomes an advertising venue for the corporations. In some communities the conflict is so great that one parade even separates into two. Taiwan Pride is still primarily a social movement, with little advertisement — there are even complaints that local gay-targeting corporations give too little support to the parade.

Taiwan Pride also differs in the type of parade. A majority of the parades around the world usually take control of the main road, blocking bystanders on the sidewalk. Taiwan Pride share the road with cars, bikes and bystanders, and is subject to regular traffic control. While it is inconvenient and sometimes dangerous for participants, sharing the road without clear separation also blurs the distinction between participants and bystanders, providing a gray zone of participation.

== History ==
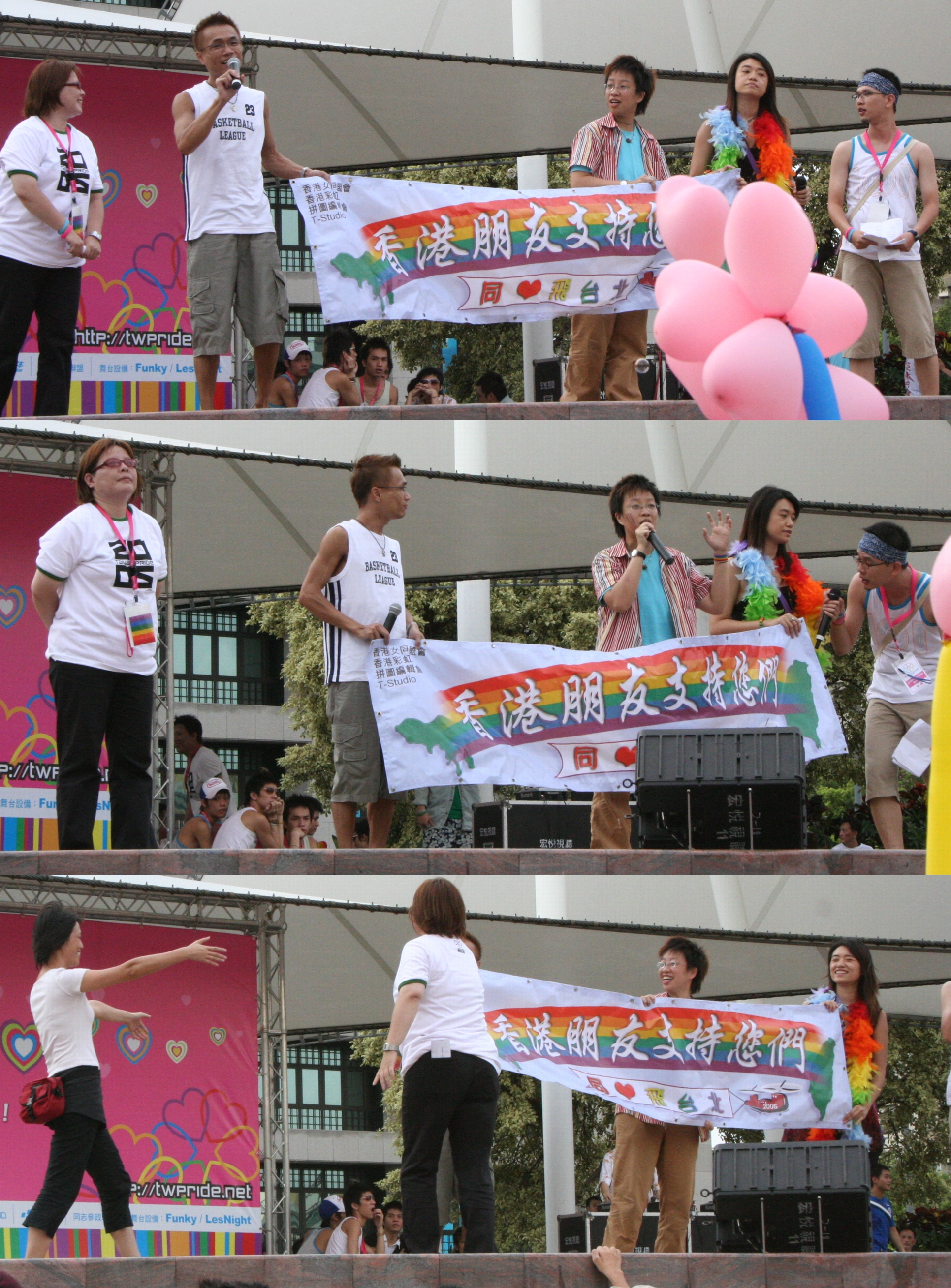
HKSAR gives banner to Taiwan Pride.

=== Before 2003 ===
There were several small pride parades before the first formal Taiwan Pride parade in 2003. For example, 300 gays identified themselves in the 1996 parade of The National Women's Coalition. In 2002, some gays publicly protested at the Ministry of National Defense against the practice of forbidding gays from military police service.

=== Taipei Pride ===
==== 2003 ====
The first Taiwan Pride parade was held on November 1, 2003, coinciding with the fourth Taipei Fun Festival (台北同玩節), which had been the first city-sponsored homosexual event in 2000. It was the first one in the Chinese community, and encouraged the gay community in Hong Kong to hold its own parade. Many people in Taiwan didn't notice the parade at all, but almost all electronic and paper media reported the parade.

The parade was held in Taipei, starting from 228 Memorial Park, a long-time gathering place for gay men in Taipei, and going along Hengyang Road to Red Playhouse in Ximending. The parade was joined by more than 20,000 people from dozens of groups, including Waterboys, NCU Center for the Study of Sexualities, Gin Gin's, and the Taiwan Tongzhi Hotline Association. As part of the government-sponsored Lesbian and Gay Civil Rights Movement, the parade received NT$70,000 from the city government. Mayor (later President) Ma Ying-jeou gave a speech at the end of the parade, saying that Taipei as an international city should respect individuals of different groups and cultures. He also said that major cities in the world all have large gay communities. The existence and respect of such communities is important to the diversity of a city. After the speech, there was an LGBT karaoke contest.

After the parade, city councillor Wang Shih-cheng criticized city government for "encouraging homosexuality" and "obscenity". Many gay groups were upset by the comments and refused funding from the government the next year.

==== 2004: Awaken citizen conscious ====
The second Taiwan Pride parade was held on November 6, 2004, again in Taipei. This parade started at 1 p.m. at Chiang Kai-shek Memorial Hall, marched along Ketagalan Boulevard, through 228 Memorial Park, Chungshan Hall, and ended at the Red Playhouse in Ximending.

The parade used "Awaken citizen conscious" as its primary slogan, along with "Citizen with exceptions‧City with colors‧Society with varieties‧Politics with participation". Featuring participants other than homosexuals, such as bisexuals, transgender people, the BDSM Company representing BDSM enthusiasts, and the Collective Of Sex Workers And Supporters (zh:日日春關懷互助協會) representing sex workers. Harmony Home Association also participated.

The parade date was close to the legislative election, and many candidates showed up to get publicity.

==== 2005: Be together! ====
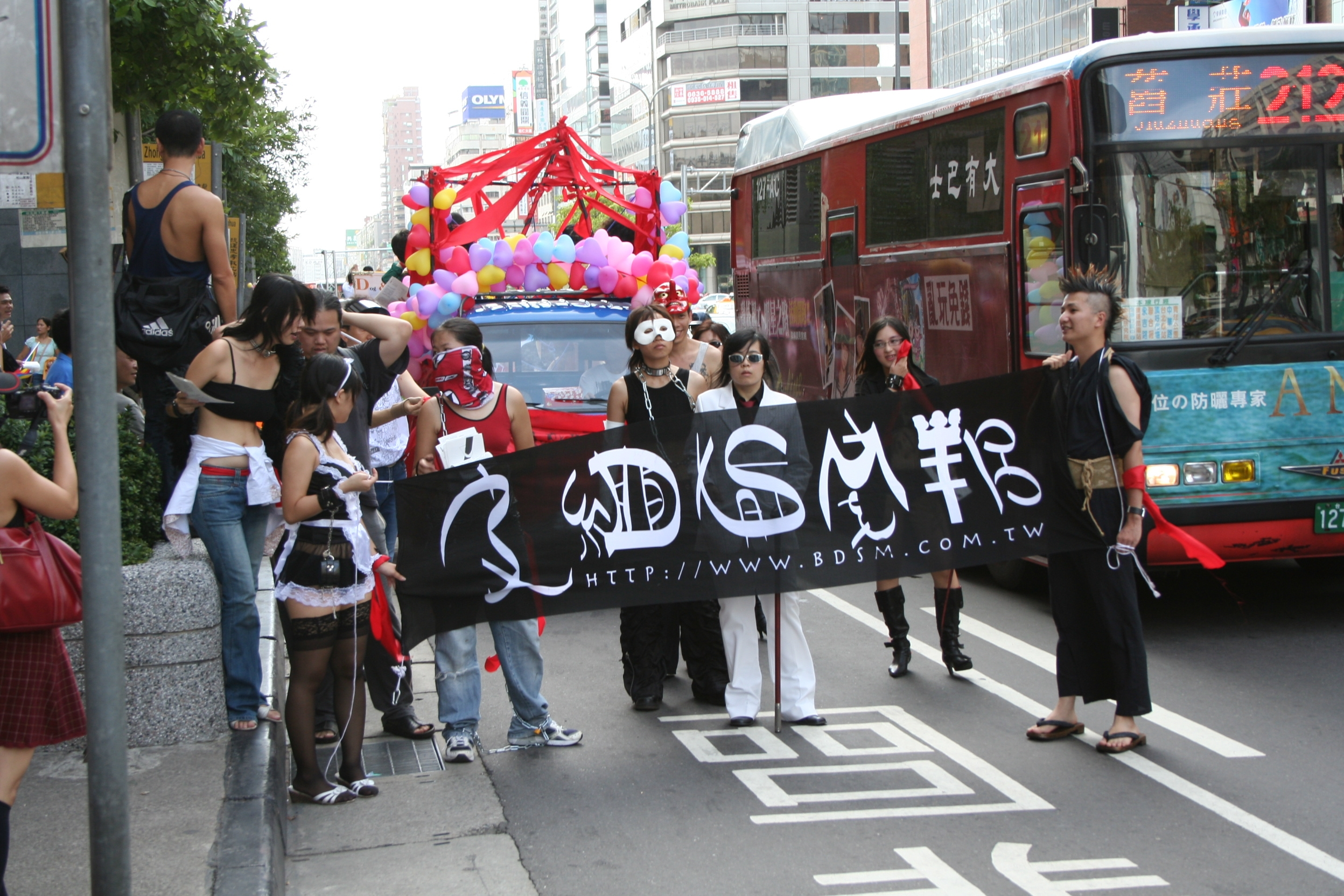
BDSM Company, part of the 2005 parade, sharing the road with cars.

The third Taiwan Pride parade, in 2005, featured the union of homosexuals, sex workers, pornographic content authors and alternative sex practitioners; against "waves of repression" such as the "Law on Classification for Published Materials and Video Programs". The parade used "Be together!" as its primary slogan. The parade was hosted by an ad hoc organization and the Taiwan Tongzhi Hotline Association. BDSM Company also took many works.

There were forecasts of a possible typhoon landfall on the day of the parade (October 1), but it was a sunny day. The parade started at 1 p.m. at the Eslite bookstore on Dunhua South Road, marched along Zhongxiao East Road Sec. 4, and ended at City Hall at 5 p.m. At the end of the parade, Women Coalition of HKSAR thanked Taiwan Pride for encouraging the Hong Kong parade in 2004, and gave a banner to Taiwan Pride, which was represented by Wang Ping from Gender/Sexuality Rights Association Taiwan. The artist Topper also gave cross-dressing performances.

===== Sponsorship =====
Many commercial organizations sponsored the parade, including Eslite bookstore, the Fridae gay dating website, and PRI.V"ee.

==== 2006: Get together and organize a family! ====
Taiwan Pride was held on September 30 in Taipei city. It was said there were more than ten thousand of people joining Taiwan Pride. The parade used "Get together and organize a family!" as its primary slogan.

==== 2007: Rainbow power ====
Taiwan Pride was held 13 October 2007 in Taipei with the parade slogan "Rainbow power". There were estimated 15,000 people in the parade. Many gay and lesbian communities from abroad also participated this time. In the middle of the road, the crowd organized a "rainbow landscape" which contains the 6 color as a gay pride symbol. Aussiebum, an Australian men's swimwear manufacturer, also sponsored a group called "Waterboy" with their swimwear. This is the first time that Taiwan Pride has a powerful commercial sponsor in its history. A-mei, referred as Queen of Chinese Pop, became the first ever spokesperson for Taiwan Pride.

==== 2008: Run the rainbow way ====
The 2008 version of Taiwan Pride was held on 27 September and attracted 18,000 participants.

==== 2009: Love out loud ====
Taiwan Pride 2009 was on 31 October. It attracted 25,000 participants. The key focus of this parade was LGBT rights, particularly anti-discrimination laws and the recognition of same-sex unions. The parade sought to express disappointment with the government, which had not acted on its previous commitments to legalize same-sex marriage.

==== 2010: Out and vote ====
Held on 30 October, under the theme "Out and vote," the Taiwanese LGBT community marched from 228 Memorial Park onwards to Ximen and then on to Taipei Main Station and back, fighting for concrete measures from the government that protect the rights of the LGBT community. To date of the parade, such commitments from the government have yet to yield tangible results. There were over 30,000 participants, making Taiwan Pride the largest Pride Parade in Asia.

Taiwan LGBT Pride Community, the organizer of Taiwan LGBT Pride Parade, decided to hold the parade on a stationary date, the last Saturday of October, since this year.

==== 2011: LGBT fight back, discrimination get out! ====
The 9th parade was held on October 29, 2011. Because of the obstacles from the True Love League while the Ministry of Education proposed lessons of gender equity based on the gender equity education, and other sexual events happening this year, the theme of the 9th parade was orientated as "LGBT Fight Back, Discrimination Get Out!"

There were about 50,000 participants. Hence, the routes had to be separated into East line and West line. The West line, which is new, went through the Chiang Kai-shek Memorial Hall, which is a large cultural and educational area in Taiwan.

The Rainbow Ambassadors of 2011 include Deserts Chang, who sang on the night party after parade and kissed a female fan on stage.

==== 2012: I do! Do I? Equal rights to marriage, diversity in partnership ====
The 10th parade was held on October 27, 2012. Around 65,000 people participated.

==== 2013: Make LGBT visible 2.0, the voice of sexual sufferer ====
The 11th parade was held on October 26, 2013.

==== 2014: Walk in queers’ shoes ====
The 12th parade was held on October 25, 2014.

==== 2015: Act who you are, not your age ====
The 13th parade was held on October 31, 2015.

==== 2016: Honor diversity, like you mean it ====
The 14th parade was held on October 29, 2016.

==== 2017: Make love, not war— sex-ed is the way to go ====
The 15th parade was held on October 28, 2017.

==== 2018: Tell Your Story, Vote for Equality ====
The 16th parade was held on October 27, 2018.

==== 2019: Together, Make Taiwan Better ====
The 17th parade was held October 26, 2019; around 200,000 people participated in the procession.

==== 2020: Taiwan Pride March for the World ====
The 18th parade acknowledged the cancellation of pride marches worldwide, due to the COVID-19 pandemic. It was held on 28 June 2020, marking the 51st anniversary of the Stonewall riots. Around 1,200 people marched in the procession.

==== 2021 ====
The 19th parade was planned as a virtual event as the COVID-19 pandemic in Taiwan grew in severity. Although the pandemic subsided as the scheduled date, 30 October 2021, drew closer, the Taiwan Rainbow Civil Action Association committed to hosting the event as planned, without any further changes to its format.

==== 2022: An Unlimited Future ====
Taiwan Pride returned as an in-person event in 2022, with over 120,000 people in attendance. The event was the 20th since it began and the theme was "An Unlimited Future."

==== 2023: Stand with Diversity ====
Taiwan Pride's theme for 2023 was "Stand with Diversity" (與多元同行). It took place on October 28 in Taipei.

==== 2024: Embrace Inclusion ====
Taiwan Pride 2024 adopted the theme "Embrace Inclusion". The event was held on October 26, with 180,000 people in attendance.

==== 2025: Beyond Links: More than Clicks ====
Around 150,000 people attended Taiwan Pride 2025 which was held on October 25, with the theme Beyond Links: More than Clicks.

==== 2026: "Our Voices, Our Journey" ====
Approximately 150,000 people attended Taiwan Pride 2026, which was themed "Our Voices, Our Journey."

=== Pride Parade in Kaohsiung, South Taiwan ===
==== Kaohsiung Pride ====
Kaohsiung was designated as the host of WorldPride in 2025. This would have been the first time the event is set to take place in an East Asian country, but organizers later withdrew in 2022.

===== 2010: Coming out =====
The first Kaohsiung LGBT Pride Parade on south Taiwan was held in 2010. The organizer of Kaohsiung parade was the South Office of Taiwan Tongzhi Hotline Association (also known as "Hotline 968"), supported by the Civil Affairs Bureau of Kaohsiung City Government, held on 18 September. There were around 2,000 participants.

===== 2011: Out & out =====
The 2nd Kaohsiung LGBT Pride Parade was held on September 24, 2011, under the theme "OUT & out" with over 3,000 participants. The parade was organized by a new organization, Kaohsiung LGBT Pride Community.

===== 2012: I am Gay and your Companion =====
The Third Annual LGBT Pride Parade in Kaohsiung was held on 22 September 2012 under the theme "I am gay and your companion" with over 3,000 participants.

===== 2013: Sharing the Same Space in Harmony =====
The Fourth Annual LGBT Pride Parade in Kaohsiung was held on 29 June 2013 under the theme "Sharing the same space in harmony" with around 4,000 participants. It was the first time the Kaohsiung Pride Parade had provided English language service from its official website. It was also the first time LGBT Pride Parade in Kaohsiung had got a lesbian convener-in-chief. The worldwide media publicity both in English and Chinese languages was a milestone for Kaohsiung. Especially, the full page, under the headline "Kaohsiung goes gay", reported by Taipei Times was the first seen in the history of Taiwan's pride parades. There were at least two foreigners' groups attended the march.

===== 2020: We! Around You =====
The theme of the eleventh Kaohsiung Pride parade, attended by 60,000 people, was "We! Around You." The event, and a "pink dollar", was featured in that year's tourism campaigns.

===== 2022: Love Beyond the Physical =====
The thirteenth Kaohsiung Pride parade was held in November 2022, with approximately 30,000 people in attendance. Its theme was "love beyond the physical."

=== Pride Parade in Taichung, Central Taiwan ===
==== Taichung Pride ====
The first Central Taiwan LGBT Pride Parade in Taichung was held on December 17, 2011, under the theme "Stand for Love, perfectly natural," and calls on the Taichung City Government to attach importance to gender/sexuality rights, and protests against the government's reduction of the gender-friendly environment and closing of many gender-friendly stores in recent years. The organizer is "League of Sex/Gender Groups in Central Taiwan".

A month and a half before the Taichung Parade, the Central Taiwan LGBT Health and Culture Center (also known as "Taichung Rainbow Paradise") was forced to move due to pressure from a landlord.

== Taiwan Trans March ==
The Taiwan Trans March was first planned by the Taiwan Tongzhi Hotline Association in 2018, and cancelled in 2021 due to the COVID0-19 pandemic, before resuming. Past marches have started at the Nishi Honganji Temple, the Red House Theater, and the 228 Peace Memorial Park, and generally feature Taipei's Ximending neighborhood.

== See also ==
- LGBTQ rights in Taiwan
- List of largest LGBTQ events
- Taiwan Tongzhi Hotline Association
- Tong-Kwang Light House Presbyterian Church
