= Tong-Kwang Light House Presbyterian Church =

- 同光同志長老教會
- Tong-Kwang Light House Presbyterian Church
- 25.048516039219702°N 121.52779261325196°E
- Country: Taiwan
- Denomination: Presbyterian
- Website: www.tkchurch.org

History
- Founded: May 5, 1996

Tong-Kwang Light House Presbyterian Church (Chinese: 同光同志長老教會; pinyin: Tóngguāng Tóngzhì Zhǎnglǎo Jiàohuì) is an independent Progressive Christian Presbyterian church in Taipei, Taiwan.

The church also works with Taiwan Tongzhi Hotline Association, and attends Taiwan Pride.

== History ==
Founded in 1996, the Tong-Kwang Light House is the first LGBTQ-affirming church in Taiwan.

== See also ==
- Christianity and homosexuality
- LGBT-welcoming church programs
