= Taiwan Alliance to Promote Civil Partnership Rights =

Taiwanese gay and lesbian advocacy organization

The Taiwan Alliance to Promote Civil Partnership Rights (TAPCPR; Chinese: 台灣伴侶權益推動聯盟伴侶盟) is a Taiwanese non-governmental advocacy organization which advocates for the expansion of civil rights for same-sex couples, including same-sex marriage, civil partnerships, adoption rights, and other freedoms. It was founded in 2009 by the Awakening Foundation, Taiwan Tongzhi Hotline Association, and other LGBTQ+ rights organisations. Among initiatives carried out by TAPCPR are launching a million-signature petition drive for the legalization of same-sex unions, floating a draft bill for consideration by the Legislative Yuan, the Interior Ministry's recognition of transgender marriages, and taking a poll showing 50% support for same-sex marriage among Taiwanese people.

TAPCPR endorsed Tsai Ing-wen's presidential election bid in 2012

== See also ==
- Same-sex marriage in Taiwan
