= LGBTQ rights in Taiwan =

LGBTQ rights in the Republic of China (Taiwan)
- Republic of China (Taiwan, Penghu, Kinmen and Matsu Area)
- Legal status: Legal
- Gender identity: Sex reassignment surgery not required to change gender on official documents since 2021
- Military: All sexual orientations are allowed to serve openly. However, transgender people are prohibited.
- Discrimination protections: Sexual orientation discrimination prohibited in education, employment, and all other areas; Gender identity discrimination prohibited in education

Family rights
- Recognition of relationships: Same-sex marriage since 2019
- Adoption: Full adoption rights since 2023

The rights of lesbian, gay, bisexual, transgender, and queer (LGBTQ) people in the Republic of China (Taiwan) are regarded as some of the most comprehensive of those in Asia. Both male and female same-sex sexual activity are legal, and same-sex marriage was legalized on 24 May 2019, following a Constitutional Court ruling in May 2017. Same-sex couples are able to jointly adopt children since 2023. Discrimination on the basis of sexual orientation, gender identity and gender characteristics in education has been banned nationwide since 2004. With regard to employment, discrimination on the basis of sexual orientation has also been prohibited by law since 2007.

The Executive Yuan first proposed the legal recognition of same-sex marriage in 2003; however, the bill received strong opposition at that time and was not voted on in the Legislative Yuan. 14 years later on 24 May 2017, the Judicial Yuan ruled that the existing marriage law was unconstitutional, and that same-sex couples should gain the right to marry. The court gave the Legislative Yuan a maximum of two years to either amend existing laws or enact laws to provide legal recognition of same-sex marriage. According to the court ruling, if it failed to do so by 24 May 2019, same-sex marriage would automatically become legal for the first time in Asia.

In November 2018, the Taiwanese electorate rejected same-sex marriage. In response, the government confirmed it would not amend the Civil Code but would instead prepare a separate law for same-sex couples. Following the same-sex marriage referendum, suicide hotlines reported a 40% surge in calls from LGBT individuals, particularly adolescents and young adults.

On 20 February 2019, a draft bill was published that would allow same-sex couples to establish a "permanent union of intimate and exclusive nature for the purpose of living a common life." The Executive Yuan passed it the following day, sending it to the Legislative Yuan for fast-tracked review. The bill was passed on 17 May, and President Tsai Ing-wen signed it on 22 May, with the law taking effect on 24 May 2019. In 2023, same-sex couples were granted the right to adopt. In 2024, cross-strait couples were also granted the right to marry, subject to the same complex legal procedures as heterosexual couples.

The Taiwanese Civil Code defines marriage as a union between a man and a woman, and still contains many gender-specific terms like "husband and wife". The law governing assisted reproduction limits access to ART, including IVF, to legally married heterosexual couples and specifically excludes same-sex female couples and single women.

The first Taiwan Pride was held in Taipei in 2003. By 2015, when the event was attended by 80,000 participants, it had become the second-largest LGBT pride in Asia. By 2019, attendance had grown to 170,000 participants. In 2022, Taiwan withdrew from hosting WorldPride 2025 due to dissatisfaction with the proposed event name, 'WorldPride Kaohsiung,' which was considered offensive by both the Taiwanese public and the government. As a result, the event was relocated to Washington, D.C., where it successfully took place under the name 'WorldPride Washington, D.C.' in June 2025.

On 3 October 2026, Taiwanese police raided a gay bar, detaining dozens of gay people on charges of obscenity and offences against morality. Detainees reportedly experienced excessive force, humiliating treatment, interrogation, and homophobic remarks.

== History of LGBT rights in Taiwan ==
=== Qing dynasty ===
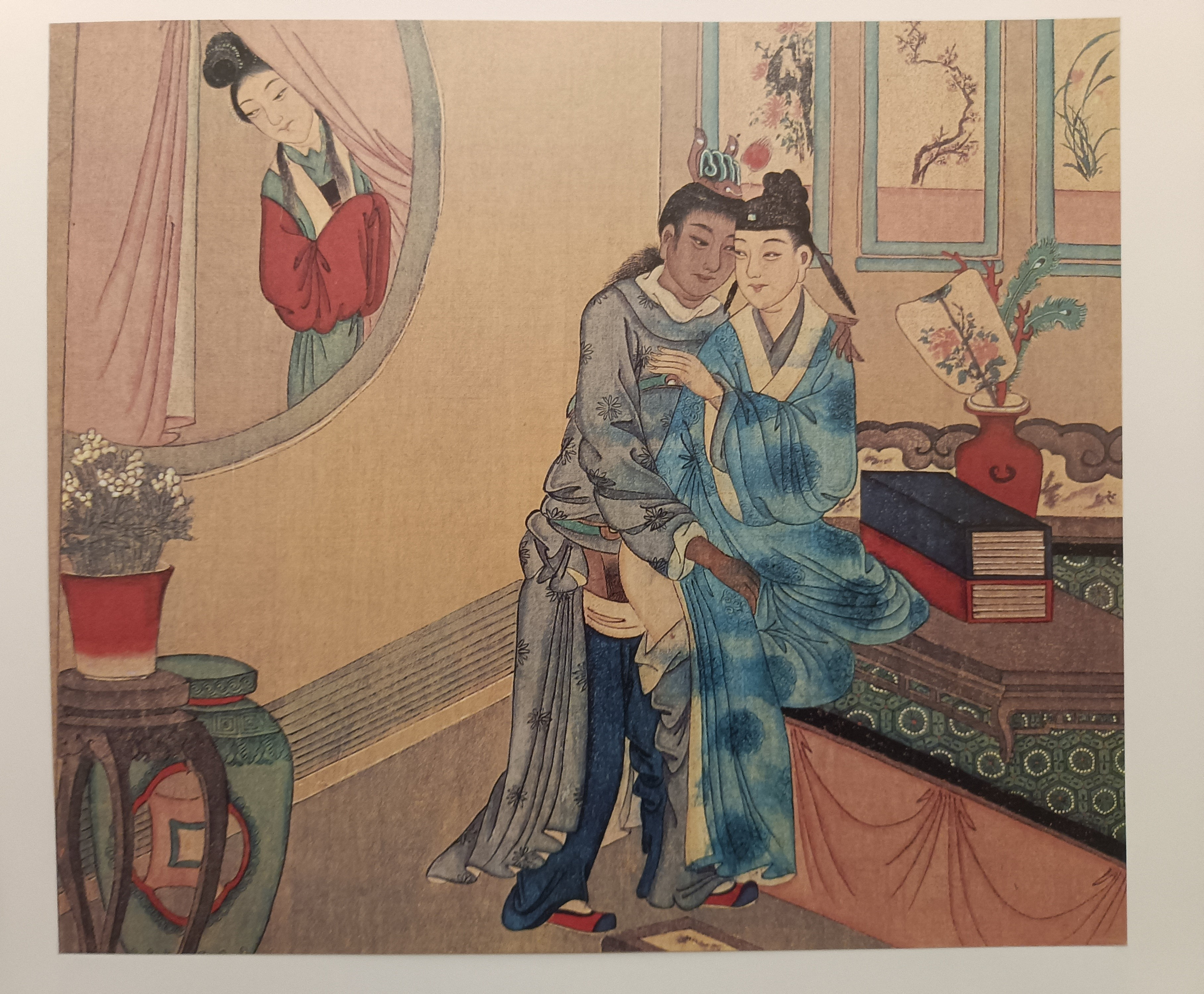
Anal sex between two men being viewed. Painting. Qing-Dynasty. 18th Century

Taiwan came under the control of the Qing in 1683 and its courts began to refer to the term ji jian (雞姦, sodomy) to apply to homosexual anal intercourse. Society began to emphasise strict obedience to the social order, which referred to a relationship between husband and wife. In 1740, an anti-homosexual decree was promulgated, defining voluntarily homosexual intercourse between adults as illegal. Though there were no records on the effectiveness of this decree, it was the first time homosexuality had been subject to legal proscription in China. The punishment, which included a month in prison and 100 heavy blows with heavy bamboo, was actually the lightest punishment which existed in the Qing legal system.

=== Japanese colonial rule ===
When Taiwan came under the Japanese rule in 1895, same-sex practices continued; however, there was a growing animosity towards these practices during the Meiji era. The practice of Nanshoku began to die out after the Russo-Japanese War. Opposition to homosexuality did not become firmly established in Japan until the 19th and 20th centuries, through the Westernization efforts of the Empire of Japan, although it was only criminalized between 1872 and 1881.

=== Republic of China ===
Sodomy was decriminalized when Republic of China took over Taiwan after World War II, implementing the 1935 criminal code. The explicit prohibitions of "consenting ji jian" were abolished around 1912 under provisional criminal code, when the Republic of China was established. During the martial law period, LGBT people were often harassed and detained under general public order laws as part of the Temporary Provisions against the Communist Rebellion. These public order laws and constitutional temporary provisions were repealed during the transition to democracy in 1991.

== Laws regarding same-sex sexual activity ==
Private and consensual sexual activity between adults of the same sex is legal in Taiwan. The criminal code contained no provisions prohibiting consensual same-sex sexual activity between adults. The age of consent is 16 regardless of sexual orientation and gender identity.

== Constitutional rights ==
The Constitution of the Republic of China does not expressly mention sexual orientation or gender identity; however, the Constitutional Court ruling on same-sex marriage in 2017 (i.e. Judicial Yuan Interpretation No. 748), based on the following two articles of the Constitution, has confirmed the following constitutional protections for LGBTQ people:

Article 7 of the Constitution states that "all citizens of the Republic of China, irrespective of sex, religion, race, class, or party affiliation, shall be equal before the law". In the constitutional interpretation issued on 24 May 2017, the Constitutional Court reasoned that the prohibited grounds of discrimination listed in the Article are "illustrative, rather than exhaustive", so the right to equal protection applies to other classifications "such as disability or sexual orientation".

Article 22 of the Constitution stipulates that "all other freedoms and rights of the people that are not detrimental to social order or public welfare shall be guaranteed under the Constitution". The Grand Justices ruled on 24 May 2017 that the freedom of marriage guaranteed by the Article applies to persons of all sexual orientations.

According to Judicial Yuan Interpretation No. 185, "the interpretations of the Judicial Yuan shall be binding upon every institution and person in the country".

== Recognition of same-sex relationships ==
In October 2003, the Executive Yuan proposed legislation granting the right to marry and adopt to same-sex couples, but it faced bipartisan opposition from members of both the Cabinet (formed by the ruling Democratic Progressive Party, DPP) and the Legislative Yuan (controlled by the Kuomintang-led Pan-blue coalition) and stalled, and thus not voted on.

In 2011, aiming to promote awareness about same-sex marriage, about 80 lesbian couples held Taiwan's then biggest same-sex wedding party, attracting about 1,000 friends, relatives and curious onlookers. In 2012, the first same-sex Buddhist wedding was held for Fish Huang and her partner You Ya-ting, with Buddhist master Shih Chao-hui presiding over the ritual. In 2013, Chen Ching-hsueh and Kao Chih-Wei, the second Taiwanese same-sex couple to wed publicly, dropped a prolonged fight to have their marriage legally recognized, citing intense social pressure. Later that year, lifelong gay activist Chi Chia-wei picked up Chen and Kao's fight to have same-sex marriage recognized, presenting his case in the Taipei High Administrative Court for the first time.

On 22 December 2014, a proposed amendment to the Civil Code which would have legalized same-sex marriage was due to go under review by the Judiciary Committee of the Legislative Yuan. If the amendment had passed the committee stage, it would then have been voted on at the plenary session of the Legislative Yuan in 2015. The amendment included replacing the current articles regarding marriage in the Civil Code with gender-neutral terms, effectively recognizing same-sex marriage. It would have also allowed same-sex couples to adopt children. Yu Mei-nu of the Democratic Progressive Party (DPP) had expressed support for the amendment, together with more than 20 other DPP lawmakers as well as two from the Taiwan Solidarity Union and one each from the ruling party Kuomintang (KMT) and the People First Party. Taiwan would have become the first Asian state (and first non-UN recognized entity) to legally recognize same-sex marriage if the Civil Code had been amended. However, the bill stalled, and the attempt officially failed in January 2016 as the Eighth Legislative Yuan ended.

In November 2015, around two months before the general election, presidential candidate Tsai Ing-wen announced her support for same-sex marriage. In July 2016, several lawmakers of the Ninth Legislative Yuan announced that they would introduce a same-sex marriage bill in Parliament by the end of the year. In October, two same-sex marriage bills were introduced to the Legislative Yuan. On 16 October 2016, Jacques Picoux, who worked at the National Taiwan University, died after falling from the tenth floor of his Taipei apartment block; friends believed he had taken his own life due to lack of same-sex marriage rights, and his death led to increased pressure on the government to legalize same-sex marriage.

=== Registration of same-sex couples ===
Prior to 24 May 2019, when Taiwan legalised same-sex marriage, more than 80% of the population lived in jurisdictions where they could administratively register same-sex relationships. However, per the Department of Household Registration, same-sex partnership registrations can no longer be entered into by same-sex couples where one or both parties are Taiwanese citizens. Couples that entered into same-sex partnerships prior to the legalisation of same-sex marriage have the option of retaining their registration status or amending their partnership to marriage.

In May 2015, the special municipality of Kaohsiung announced a plan to allow same-sex couples to apply for a remark of their partnership on the computerized household register, largely for reference only. It would be of little use when a person wishes to grant consent to surgery on the partner's behalf at hospitals, for instance. Taiwan LGBT Rights Advocacy, an NGO, criticized the plan as merely a measure to "make fun of" the community without having any substantive effect.

On 17 June 2015, the special municipality of Taipei became the second jurisdiction in Taiwan to implement a relationship register scheme for couples. Taichung followed suit in October 2015, Tainan and New Taipei on 1 February 2016, Chiayi on 1 March 2016, Taoyuan on 14 March 2016, both Changhua County and Hsinchu County on 1 April 2016, Yilan County on 20 May 2016, and Chiayi County on 20 October 2016. By early July 2017, Hsinchu City, Keelung City, Kinmen County, Lienchiang County, Miaoli County, Nantou County and Pingtung County had begun offering household registration services for same-sex partnerships. Starting from 3 July 2017, residents living in the remaining counties which refused to provide same-sex partnership registration, including Yunlin County, Hualien County, Taitung County and Penghu County, could register their partnership in other cities or counties, as the technicality of registration became standardized by the Ministry of the Interior on the national level. By June 2017, a total of 2,233 same-sex couples (i.e. 4,466 individuals) were registered, of which 1,755 were lesbian couples.

At the time, any two unmarried persons of the same sex could apply, in person, to any household registration office (except in the four counties mentioned above) to have their partnership recorded on the computerized household register. However, this information would not be displayed on either the National Identification Card or the Household Certificate (the latter shows the basic personal information of all individuals registered under the same address and the relationship between these individuals). Instead, the household registration office issues a letter to the applicants certifying the registration. Kaohsiung and Taipei municipalities also issue partnership cards. Citizens with a foreign partner are also eligible for registration, but the foreign partner needs to provide a Certificate of No Marriage Record, or equivalent, from the country of origin and have it authenticated by the respective embassy or representative office of Taiwan.

Nevertheless, the same-sex partnership registration, being an administrative measure, does not confer any actual legal status to a same-sex couple. The protections offered to same-sex partners are very limited, such as the right of requesting family care leave, applying for public housing as a family unit (in Taipei only) and granting consent to surgery on the partner's behalf.

=== Constitutional Court ruling and referendum ===
On 24 March 2017, the Constitutional Court heard a case brought by gay rights activist Chi Chia-wei (whose attempt at registering a marriage with his partner in 2013 was rejected) and the Taipei City Government's Department of Civil Affairs. Both petitioners had requested a constitutional interpretation on the issue. The Court decided to issue a judgment on whether the current Civil Code in fact allows same-sex marriage and if not, whether it violates articles under the Constitution of the Republic of China pertaining to equal rights and the freedom to marry. Those who appeared before the Court on that day included counsels of both petitioners, Justice Minister Chiu Tai-san (who defended the existing laws on marriage) and a panel of legal scholars. This was the first time a Constitutional Court hearing was broadcast live.

The Constitutional Court ruled on 24 May 2017 that the clauses pertaining to marriage in the Civil Code were unconstitutional. The panel of judges gave the Parliament (Legislative Yuan) two years to amend or enact new laws. The Court further stipulated that should the Legislative Yuan fail to legalize same-sex marriage within two years, same-sex couples would be able to marry by going through the existing marriage registration procedure at any household registration office.

On 24 November 2018, Taiwanese voters were presented with five LGBT-related initiatives: to ban same-sex marriage (Question 10), to ban LGBT-inclusive sex education in schools (Question 11), to allow another type of union for same-sex couples (Question 12), to allow same-sex marriage (Question 14), and lastly to retain LGBT-inclusive sex education in schools (Question 15). Three of these questions were submitted by opponents of LGBT rights and the other two were submitted by advocates of LGBT rights. Voters rejected the idea of same-sex marriage, passing Questions 10, 11, and 12 and rejecting Questions 14 and 15. In response, the government confirmed it would not amend the Civil Code but would instead prepare a separate law for same-sex couples Following the same-sex marriage referendum, suicide hotlines reported a 40% surge in calls from LGBT individuals, particularly adolescents and young adults.

=== Approval by the Legislative Yuan ===
On 20 February 2019, a draft bill was published that would allow same-sex couples to establish a "permanent union of intimate and exclusive nature for the purpose of living a common life." The Executive Yuan passed it the following day, sending it to the Legislative Yuan for fast-tracked review. The bill was passed on 17 May, and President Tsai Ing-wen signed it on 22 May, with the law taking effect on 24 May 2019. In 2023, same-sex couples were granted the right to adopt. In 2024, cross-strait couples were also granted the right to marry, subject to the same complex legal procedures as heterosexual couples.

The Taiwanese Civil Code defines marriage as a union between a man and a woman, and still contains many gender-specific terms like "husband and wife". The law governing assisted reproduction limits access to ART, including IVF, to legally married heterosexual couples and specifically excludes same-sex female couples and single women.

=== Taipei High Administrative Court ruling ===
In May 2021, the Taipei High Administrative Court revoked a government office's 2019 decision to reject the marriage registration of Ting Tse-yen and his partner Leong Chin-fai from Macau.

Leong Chin-fai, moved from Macao to Taiwan in 2017, and has since stayed with his Taiwanese partner Ting Tse-yen. However, they were refused to register for marriage, despite Taiwan being Leong's habitual residence. The two met with reporters outside the court after they learned of their victory.

"Today's ruling is not the end. It's a process and a small milestone," Leong said. "We hope in the future, all international same-sex couples can register their marriages directly, rather than having to go to court."

== Adoption and family planning ==
Same-sex couples are able to legally adopt. Until 2023, they could only adopt the biological child of their same-sex partner (so-called stepchild adoptions). Taiwan law only allows for married people to adopt, but also allows single individuals to adopt, depending on the circumstances, including individual LGBT people.

In January 2022, following a court order, a same-sex couple legally adopted a child in Taiwan. The Taiwan legislature had not yet codified within legislation full adoption rights for same-sex couples at that time.

Under the Artificial Reproduction Act (Chinese: 人工生殖法), assisted reproductive technologies are available only to heterosexual married couples. However, the Taiwan IVF Group, which has worked in collaboration with the Stanford University Fertility & Reproductive Health Center in the United States, has operated at least one center which has provided IVF access and sperm surrogacy to individual gays and lesbians in Taiwan since the 1990s.

In May 2023, legislation formally passed to allow same-sex couples full adoption rights - instead of partial rights implemented in 2019.

== Discrimination protections ==
Discrimination based on sexual orientation, gender identity and other gender-related attributes in education has been banned since June 2004 when the Gender Equity Education Act (Chinese: 性別平等敎育法) was passed. Specifically, schools that discriminate against students due to their sexual orientation or gender identity, in terms of admission, instruction, assessment, etc., are subject to a fine of NT$100,000. In June 2011, new clauses on sexual bullying were added to the Act. Schools are obliged to prevent and report bullying that is directed at a person's sexual orientation or gender identity.

In 2007 and 2008, the Legislative Yuan passed amendments to two employment laws banning discrimination based on sexual orientation at work. Any employer who breaches the anti-discrimination clauses in the Employment Service Act (Chinese: 就業服務法) or the Act of Gender Equality in Employment (Chinese: 性別工作平等法) could face a fine of NT$300,000 to NT$1,500,000.

In March 2010, the Ministry of Education announced that, starting from 2011, school curriculum and textbooks would include topics on LGBTQ rights and nondiscrimination. According to the Ministry, the reform seeks to "root out discrimination", since "students should be able to grow up happily in an environment of tolerance and respect". Due to strong opposition from anti-LGBT groups, a compromise was made. For instance, one teaching objective was changed from "understanding one's sexual orientation" to "respecting diverse sexual orientations". In November 2018, following a referendum, Education Minister Yeh Jiunn-rong said that the approval of the initiative ("Do you agree that the Ministry of Education and individual schools should not teach homosexual-related education in schools?") does not mean that the Ministry of Education will stop promoting gender equality education, but LGBT-related content will be reviewed to see if it needs revising in accordance with the referendum results.

The Long-Term Care Services Act (Chinese: 長期照顧服務法), enacted in January 2017 to regulate long-term care services for persons with illness or disability who cannot live fully independently, contains an anti-discrimination clause that covers sexual orientation and gender identity.

In 2017, the Taiwanese Constitutional Court, also known as the Judicial Yuan, issued J.Y. Interpretation No. 748, which stated that Article 7 of the Constitution prohibits discrimination based on sexual orientation. The ruling stated that "the five classifications of impermissible discrimination set forth in Article 7 of the Constitution are only exemplified, neither enumerated nor exhausted. Therefore, different treatments based on other classifications, such as disability or sexual orientation, shall also be governed by the right to equality under the said Article."

== Transgender rights ==
Since 1988, the government of Taiwan has allowed people to change their gender on their ID and other legal documents with surgery requirements and two psychiatric diagnosis certificates.

In 2002, transgender activist Tsai Ya-ting unsuccessfully petitioned the Presidential office to allow her to use a photo that represented her actual appearance on her National Identification Card.

In 2008, the Ministry of the Interior stipulated in an executive order that transgender and intersex people must undergo sex reassignment surgery in order to change their legal gender on personal documents. Plans to remove the surgery requirement were discussed in late 2014, but were not implemented. In October 2019, a transgender woman attempted to change the designated gender on her national identification card. Her local household registration office refused the request, as she had only provided diagnostic evidence of gender dysphoria, and no evidence of sex reassignment surgery. An appeal to her local government was unsuccessful. The Taipei High Administrative Court ruled on the case in September 2021, permitting her gender to be listed as female without evidence of sex reassignment surgery. The Taipei High Administrative Court issued the decision based on the Constitution, which guarantees all freedoms and rights that are not detrimental to social order or public welfare. In addition, the court cited previous legal interpretations that concluded all limitations on people's rights must be enumerated in a specific law. The judgement was finalized after the local household registration office opted to not appeal. However, ordinary court rulings in Taiwan can only refuse to apply executive orders on a case-by-case basis, not repeal them. Therefore, said judgement only applies to the plaintiff and does not bind the executive branch. Relevant regulations still officially require sex reassignment surgery before legal gender change, unless with a favoring judgement.

In August 2013, Taiwanese authorities accepted a request for the country's first transgender marriage, after initially questioning the couple's gender.

In August 2016, Audrey Tang, a top software programmer, was appointed by the Tsai Administration to the Cabinet and became the first transgender minister of Taiwan. Her role as the Minister without portfolio (i.e. heading no particular ministry) deals with helping government agencies communicate policy goals and managing government-published information, both via digital means.

In January 2018, it was announced that plans to introduce a third gender option on identification documents, such as passports and the National Identification cards, would be implemented in the near future. In November 2018, Chen Mei-ling, the Minister of the National Development Council, announced that these plans will come into effect in 2020. The third gender option was under discussion at one point but wasn't implemented later.

A 2020 survey found that 55% of transgender Taiwanese were afraid of using a public restroom, 19% had been harassed or attacked in public, and 16% were afraid to ask a police officer for help.

== Conversion therapy ==
On 13 May 2016, the Health Bureau of the Taichung City Government announced that medical institutions in Taichung are prohibited from engaging in conversion therapy. According to Shader Liu, a member of Taichung's Gender Equality Committee, any group – medical, civil or religious – that practices it is violating the Physicians Act (Chinese: 醫師法) and the Psychologists Act (Chinese: 心理師法), respectively. The committee made a request to the Ministry of Health and Welfare to make the new rule applicable nationwide, so as to eliminate the practice.

On 30 December 2016, the Ministry of Health and Welfare announced that it would draft an amendment to the Physicians Act to prohibit conversion therapy. The Taiwanese Society of Psychiatry and human rights groups recommended that conversion therapy be banned. Members of the public had the opportunity to offer their opinions on the draft amendment for 60 days, after which the Ministry would issue regulations. The regulations were expected to bypass Parliament in late January 2017 and take effect in March 2017. According to the Physicians Act, doctors who engage in prohibited treatments are subject to fines of between NT$100,000 (US$3,095) to NT$500,000 (US$15,850) and may be suspended for one month to one year. However, the proposed regulations were stalled by fierce resistance from anti-LGBT groups.

Instead of pushing ahead legal amendments or new regulations, on 22 February 2018, the Ministry of Health and Welfare issued a letter to all local health authorities, which effectively banned conversion therapy. In the letter, the Ministry states that sexual orientation conversion is not regarded as a legitimate healthcare practice and that any individual performing the so-called therapy is liable to prosecution under the Criminal Code or the Protection of Children and Youths Welfare and Rights Act (Chinese: 兒童及少年福利與權益保障法), depending on the circumstances.

== Military service ==
While lesbian, gay and bisexual people have been able to serve openly in the military since 2002, transgender people are not allowed.

It was reported that from 1 January 2026 transgender and intersex individuals were no longer banned from military services. Exemptions are still applied with certain cases. All males over 18 within Taiwan are required to serve within the military for 1 year, because Taiwan has conscription.

== Blood donation ==
In December 2016, the Center for Disease Control announced that it would lift the lifelong ban on gay and bisexual men donating blood. The Taiwan Blood Services Foundation commented that other exclusion criteria provided adequate safeguards against unsafe blood.

In March 2018, the Government gazetted, for a two-month public consultation, amendments to the Standards on Assessing Donor Suitability for Blood Donation that included allowing gay and bisexual men who have not had sex with another man for five years to donate blood. A spokesperson for the Ministry of Health and Welfare said that the abstinence period would be further reduced to one year in the future, so as to bring the Taiwanese standard in line with Western countries.

In 2018, Taiwan planned to permit gay and bisexual men to donate blood following five years of abstinence from sex. Due to the backlash, it has been postponed.

== Living conditions ==
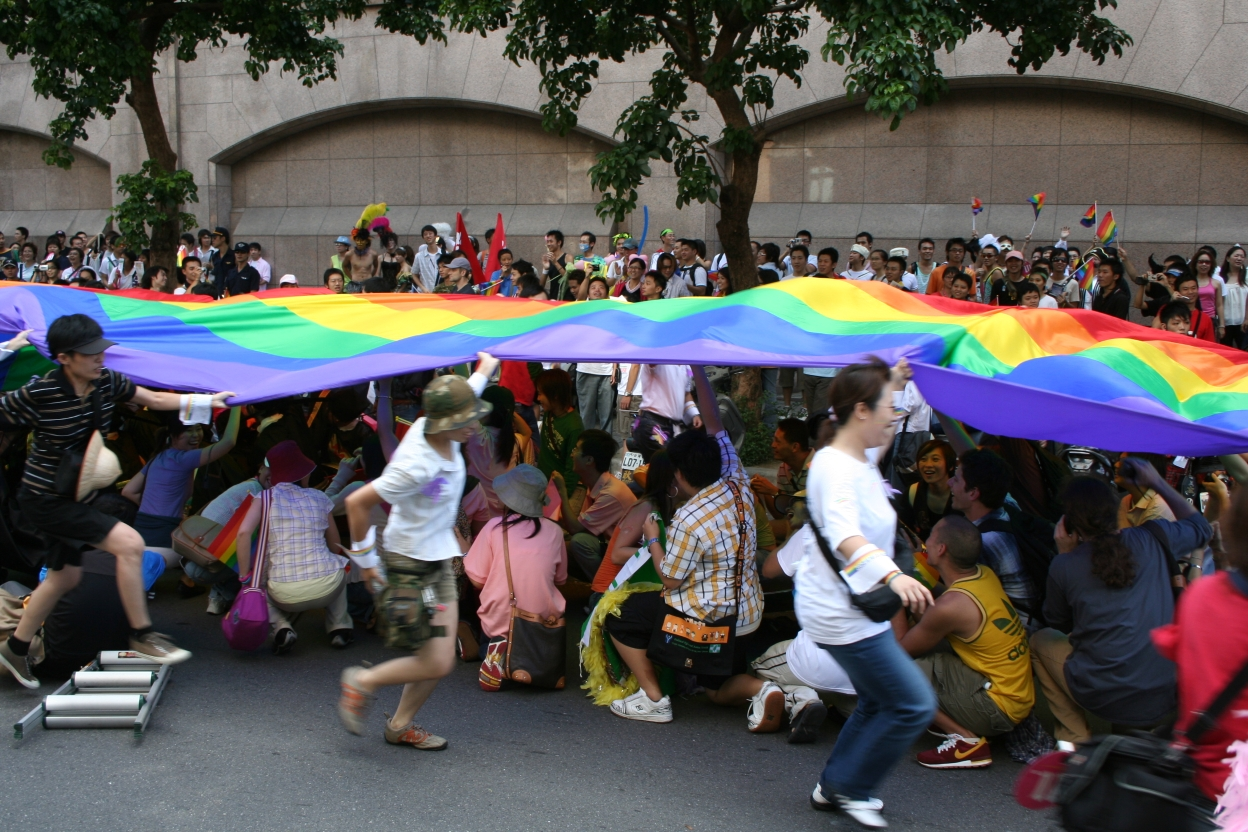
Taiwan Pride 2005

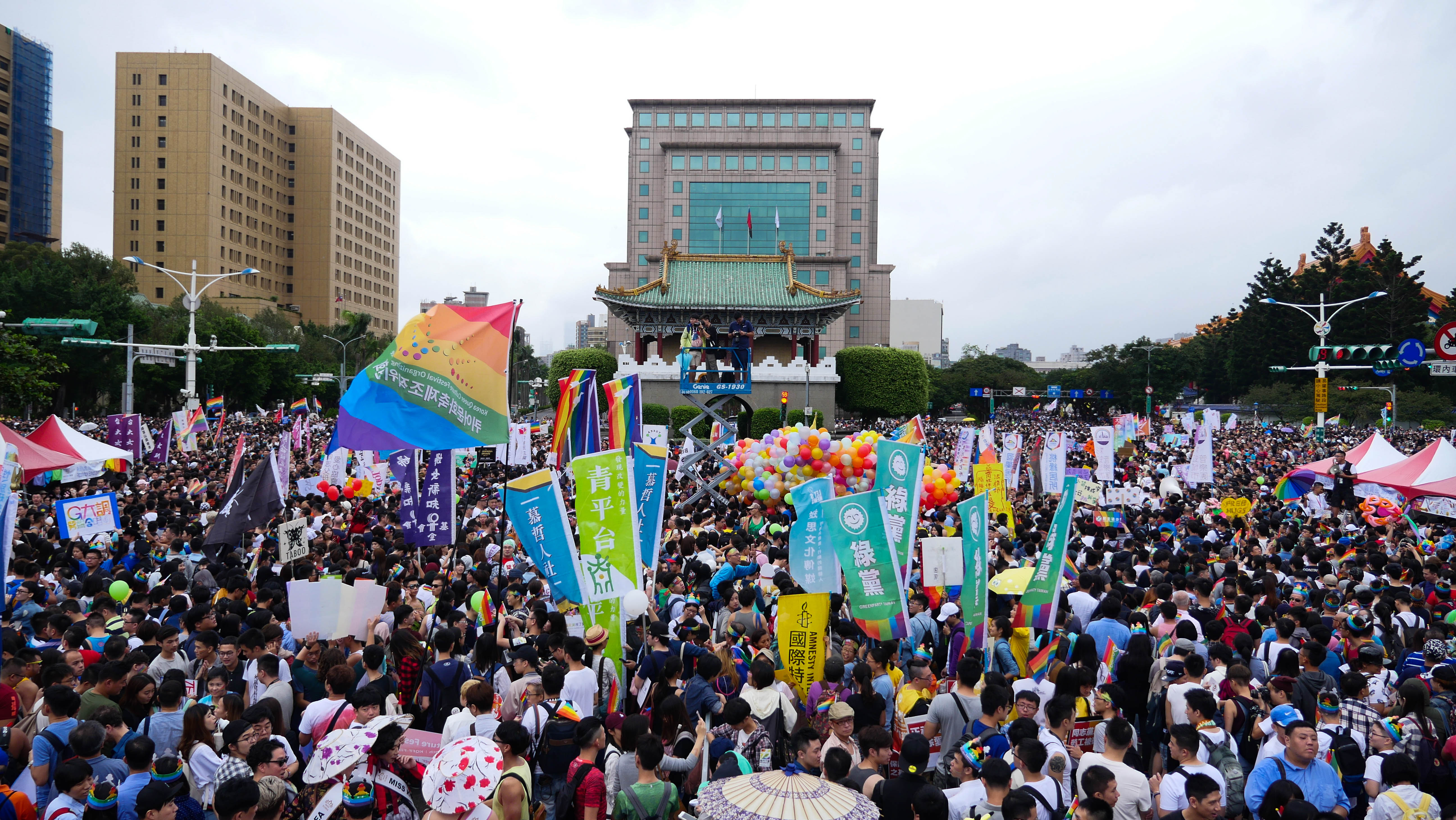
The 2016 edition of Taiwan Pride

On 1 November 2003, Taiwan Pride, the first LGBT pride parade in the Chinese-speaking world, was held in Taipei, with over 1,000 people attending. It has taken place annually since then. In the early years, many participants wore masks to hide their identity because homosexuality remained a social taboo in Taiwan. This has gradually changed over the years. The 2010 parade attracted 30,000 attendees and increased media and political attention, highlighting the growing acceptance of LGBT people in Taiwan. Since 2010, there has also been a pride parade in Kaohsiung; the first pride in the city attracted over 2,000 people. The city of Taichung also holds pride parades, with the 2016 one attracting a crowd of 20,000 people. The 2017 Taiwan Pride parade was attended by an estimated 123,000 people. The 2018 parade was attended by 137,000 people.

Representations of LGBTQ people in literary and cinematic works are also instrumental in promoting public awareness of LGBT people and advancing LGBT rights in Taiwan. In the 1970s, some novels regarding homosexuality were published. One of the most prominent writers is Pai Hsien-yung, who introduced gay characters in his novels, the most famous being Crystal Boys. More recently, some gay TV series and movies have been produced and have gained great attention among gay communities in both Taiwan and China. Examples include the TV series Crystal Boys, adapted from Pai Hsien-yung's novel by the same title, and the movie Formula 17. In 2005, Taiwanese director, Ang Lee, directed the gay Western film Brokeback Mountain, receiving high critical acclaim and Academy Awards. Spider Lilies, a lesbian film directed by Zero Chou, was screened at the 2007 Berlin International Film Festival. It won the Teddy Award for best gay feature film.

LGBT people in Taiwan generally have strong, supportive social networks, though many still face difficulty being accepted by family members due to the pervasive "traditional family values" that still exist in Taiwanese culture.

=== Rabbit God ===
Tu'er Shen (兔兒神), also known as the Rabbit God (兔神), is the Taoist (Chinese folk religion) matchmaker god for homosexual relations, and is a deity of homosexual love. In 2006, Lu Wei-ming founded a temple for Tu'er Shen in Yonghe District in New Taipei City. About 9,000 gay pilgrims visit the temple each year for praying, particularly for a partner. The temple also performs marriage ceremonies for same-sex couples. It is the world's only religious shrine for gay individuals.

== Public opinion ==
Public opinion on same-sex marriage (2023) based on Pew Research Center
1. Strongly favor (19.0%)
2. Somewhat favor (26.0%)
3. Not sure (13.0%)
4. Somewhat oppose (15.0%)
5. Strongly oppose (27.0%)

According to a Pew Research Center poll in November 2023, 45% of Taiwanese supported same-sex marriage, while 43% were opposed.

A poll of 6,439 adults released in April 2006 by the National Union of Taiwan Women's Association/Constitutional Reform Alliance concluded that 75% believed "homosexual relations are acceptable", while 25% thought "they are unacceptable".

A 2013 online poll showed that 53% of Taiwanese supported same-sex marriage. According to the online poll, 76% were in favor of equal rights for gays and lesbians.

In May 2015, PlanetRomeo, an LGBT social network, published its first Gay Happiness Index (GHI). Gay men from over 120 countries were asked about how they feel about society's view on homosexuality, how they experience the way they are treated by other people and how satisfied they are with their lives. Taiwan was ranked 34th with a GHI score of 54.

A 2015 online poll showed that 59% of respondents approved legislation allowing same-sex couples to establish "marriage-like" relations, with 75% supporting same-sex marriage.

An opinion poll conducted face-to-face in January–May 2020 by Taiwan's Election and Democratization Survey found that 43% of respondents supported same-sex marriage, while 57% were opposed.

In May 2020 a coalition of five LGBT organizations under the name Equal Love Taiwan conducted a poll. 92.8% of the respondents weren't affected by the legalization of same-sex marriage, 3.7% said they were affected negatively because of it and 1.8% were positively affected by the legalization. A majority of 56.8% were in favor of allowing same-sex couples to adopt children, 38.4% were against it. 50.1% were opposed to allowing same sex-couples to use artificial reproductive technologies, 42.1% were in favor of it. A majority (65%) could accept if a family member, classmate or coworker would be gay. 49.2% could accept if their child was gay, 47.3% said it would be hard to accept if their child was gay. 53% would accept if their child was taught about the LGBT topics in school. A minority of the respondents would accept if they saw public display of affection of same-sex couples (48.2%), a majority would accept it if heterosexual couples would do the same (74.1%).

Two LGBT groups conducted a survey in May 2020 which showed that 49.7% LGBT respondents would be worried that their workplace relations would be affected if they came out in the workplace. A small majority of 55% came out to a few colleagues, a minority of 30% came out to someone in a higher position than them. 38.1% of the respondents said that there were colleagues out in their workplace.

According to a 2022 survey by the World Values Survey, 41% of Taiwanese "would not like to have homosexuals as neighbors".

A 2026 survey by Trend Polls found that support for same-sex marriage has risen to 54.3%, marking a 12% increase since the 2019 survey. In a similar trend, acceptance of LGBTQ+ lawmakers has climbed to nearly 70%, up from a lower level in the earlier survey.

== Summary table ==
Same-sex sexual activity legal	Yes (Since 1912)
Equal age of consent	Yes
Anti-discrimination laws in employment	Yes (Since 2007)
Anti-discrimination laws in education	Yes (Since 2004)
Anti-discrimination laws in the provision of goods and services	No
Anti-discrimination laws in all other areas (incl. indirect discrimination, hate speech)	No
Hate crime laws include sexual orientation and gender identity	No
Same-sex marriage	Yes (Since 2019)
Recognition of same-sex couples	Yes (registered partnerships between 2015 and 2019)
Stepchild adoption by same-sex couples	Yes (Since 2019)
Joint adoption by same-sex couples	Yes (Since 2023)
Adoption by single people regardless of sexual orientation	Yes
Allowed to serve within the Taiwanese military	Yes (Since 2002 for LGB individuals and 2026 for TI individuals - exemptions for some cases)
Right to change legal gender on a birth certificate	Yes (Since 1988, with surgery requirements and two psychiatric diagnosis certificates.
Third gender option	No
Intersex minors protected from invasive surgical procedures	No
Conversion therapy banned by law	Yes / No (only medical professionals are barred from practicing conversion therapy)
Gay panic defense banned by law	No
Homosexuality declassified as an illness	Yes
Access to IVF for lesbian couples	No (only heterosexual married couples may access IVF treatments)
Automatic parenthood for both spouses after birth	No
Altruistic surrogacy for gay male couples	No
MSMs allowed to donate blood	No

== See also ==
- Same-sex marriage in Taiwan
- Human rights in Taiwan
- Intersex rights in Taiwan
- Taiwan Pride
- Tongzhi
- Taiwan Tongzhi Hotline Association
- List of largest LGBT events
- LGBT rights in Asia
  - LGBT rights in the People's Republic of China
  - LGBT rights in Japan
  - LGBT rights in North Korea
  - LGBT rights in South Korea
