= Gender Equity Education Act (Taiwan) =

2004 law in Taiwan

Gender Equality Education Act 性別平等敎育法 Xìngbié Píngděng Jiàoyù Fǎ (Mandarin) Sèng-pia̍t Pêng-téng Kàu-io̍k Hoat (Taiwanese) Sin-phe̍t Phiàng-tén Kau-yuk Fap (Hakka)

Legislative Yuan
- Citation: Gender Equity Education Act
- Passed: June 4, 2004
- Signed by: President Chen Shui-bian
- Signed: June 23, 2004
- Effective: June 25, 2004
- Administered by: Ministry of Education

Legislative history
- Introduced by: Executive Yuan
- First reading: April 16, 2004
- Second reading: June 4, 2004
- Third reading: June 4, 2004

Amended by
- May 26, 2010 (1st amendment); June 22, 2011 (2nd amendment); December 21, 2013 (3rd amendment); December 28, 2018 (current)
- Status: In force

Gender Equality Education Act (Chinese: 性別平等敎育法) of Taiwan was enacted on June 23, 2004. The General Provisions states the purposes of the act: "to promote substantive gender equality, eliminate gender discrimination, uphold human dignity, and improve and establish education resources and environment of gender equality." In recent years, this act has become controversial because it has implemented anti-discrimination on LGBT rights and LGBT sex education.

== Content ==
(Note: this is not an exact quotation)

=== General Provisions ===
The chapter states that the central competent authority is Ministry of Education, and local competent authorities are city government, etc.

All competent authorities and schools shall have a "gender equality education committee", whose tasks include promoting curricula, teaching, and assessments on gender equality education.

At least half of the members of such a committee shall be women, and at least two thirds of the members shall be experts in the area.

This chapter specifically defines "sexual assault or sexual harassment on campus" as "sexual assault or sexual harassment that involves the school principal, faculty, staff or student as one party and student as the other party", separate these events from others.

=== Learning environment and resources ===
The chapter states

- The school shall not discriminate in its teaching, assessments, etc. against students on the basis of their gender or sexual orientation. But shall affirmatively provide assistance to students who are disadvantaged due to those (such as lesbian, gay, bisexual transgender, and pregnant students) in order to improve their situation.
- The admission acceptance shall be gender neutral, except schools with historical tradition or other reasons. (Many famous schools in Taiwan are single-sex)
- Faculty shall be given gender equality courses before and during career.
- The school shall build safe campus, such as safer toilets.
- The chapter specifically states the school shall affirmatively protect pregnant students' right to education.
- At least one-third of members shall consist of either sex, in Staff Appraisal Committee and similar organization of schools, unless members either sex are too few.

=== Curriculum, teaching materials and instruction ===
Curricula shall cover gender equality education. The school shall develop relevant plan and assessments. All curricula shall comply with principle of gender equality. All teachers shall maintain gender equality consciousness, and "shall encourage students to take courses in fields that are not traditionally affiliated with their gender".

The Enforcement Rules for the act further states that gender equality education curricula shall cover "affective education, sex education, and gay and lesbian education".

=== Prevention and handling of sexual assault and sexual harassment on campus ===
- When handling such a case, the school shall report according to relevant laws, and turn the case to its gender equality education committee.
- The party's and offense-reporter's identities shall be kept confidential.
- The victim shall be informed with rights, and provided with protection measures if necessary.

=== Application for investigation and relief ===
If the school violates the act, victim can apply for investigation to the supervising authority.

== History ==
The act originated from Taiwanese local feminism movement in 1980s, began to be drawn in 2000, and was announced in 2004.

=== Origin ===
The act originated from earlier demands of "sex equality" (兩性平等, literally translated as "Equality of two sex") education. 1988, Awakening Foundation published a handbook, which examined the official edition of textbooks of primary and high schools on language and social science, and concluded them full of gender stereotypes.

1996, following then policy of educational reforms, Awakening Foundation presented the Education Reform Council of Executive Yuan with five demands:

1. Improve textbooks
2. Train faculty
3. Establish gender equality committee
4. Increase women's participation in decision making
5. Set up women studies curricula

The first four demands became the content of Gender Equality Education Act.

In the end of the same year, Sexual Assault Prevention Act was passed quickly because of the shock of the rape-murder case of a feminist Peng Wan-ru. The act states that primary and high schools shall have "gender equality education". This is the legal basis of Gender Equality Education Act. In March 1997, the Ministry of Education established the "Gender Equality Education Committee", which later gave rise to the act.

In 1999, the Ministry of Education passed the executive order of "Principles of Handling Sexual Assault or Sexual Harassment on College Campus, Primary and Secondary Schools". Schools followed order to establish rules and taskforces.

=== Design and legislation ===
In 2000, "Gender Equality Education Committee" commended Chen Hwei-shin, Shen Mei-chen, Su Chien-ling and Hsieh Hsiao-chin to draw the draft of "Gender Equality Education Act". The draft was completed in 2001. The draft contained all five chapters of the Gender Equality Education Act.

In this version, there is work protection of pregnant faculty and staff in the chapter about learning environment, but not in that chapter of Gender Equality Education Act, because such protection has been given by "Gender Equality In Employment Law".

During the draft the committee was shocked by the death of student Yeh Yung-chih, who was later considered as having Gender dysphoria. Thus the committee concerned more on gender, sexual orientation, and sexual identity, and in 2002 changed the name of the act from "Gender Equality" (兩性平等, literally translated as "Equality of two sex") to "Gender Equality" (性別平等) .

The draft of Gender Equality Education Act was completed in May 2003, passed Executive Yuan meeting on March 31, 2004, and then entered stage of legislation.

The "NGO League of Promoting Gender Equality Education Act" (性別平等敎育法民間推動聯盟) was then formed. It included Awakening Foundation, and Taiwan Tongzhi Hotline Association. June 4, The act was passed in Legislative Yuan, and on June 23, it was announced by the president.

=== Implementation ===
Before the act was announced, there were already many training and curriculum studies. After the announcement, all training and studies were based on the act. Taiwan Tongzhi Hotline Association has been hosting "Understanding LGBT" workshop for teachers since 2000.

There are also some schools combined previous sex education and abstinence education (run by religious groups in public schools) such as showcasing a documentary of abortion as their version of gender equality education. The official course contents regulation "Index of Capabilities" is still under studies in March 2006.

All public schools had established committees according to the act, religious private schools may get exemptions.

Although the "violence from ex-lovers" was not addressed in the draft of the act, major criminal cases of such violence are still occurring. And there are people who wish the act would result more affective education to reduce such violence.

On March 30, 2006, Ministry of Education ruled that any campus-wide competition or selection campaign (such as beauty contest) must summit project to the gender equality commission of the school. And if the campaign violate the regulation of gender discrimination of the act, the campaign would be corrected.

== See also ==
- Education in Taiwan
- Global Gender Gap Report
- Gender equality
- Gender mainstreaming
- Sexual harassment and sexual assault
- Gender discrimination
- LGBT rights in Taiwan
- Women's Educational Equality Act in USA
