= Yu Mei-nu =

Taiwanese politician and lawyer

Yu Mei-nu MLY
- 尤美女
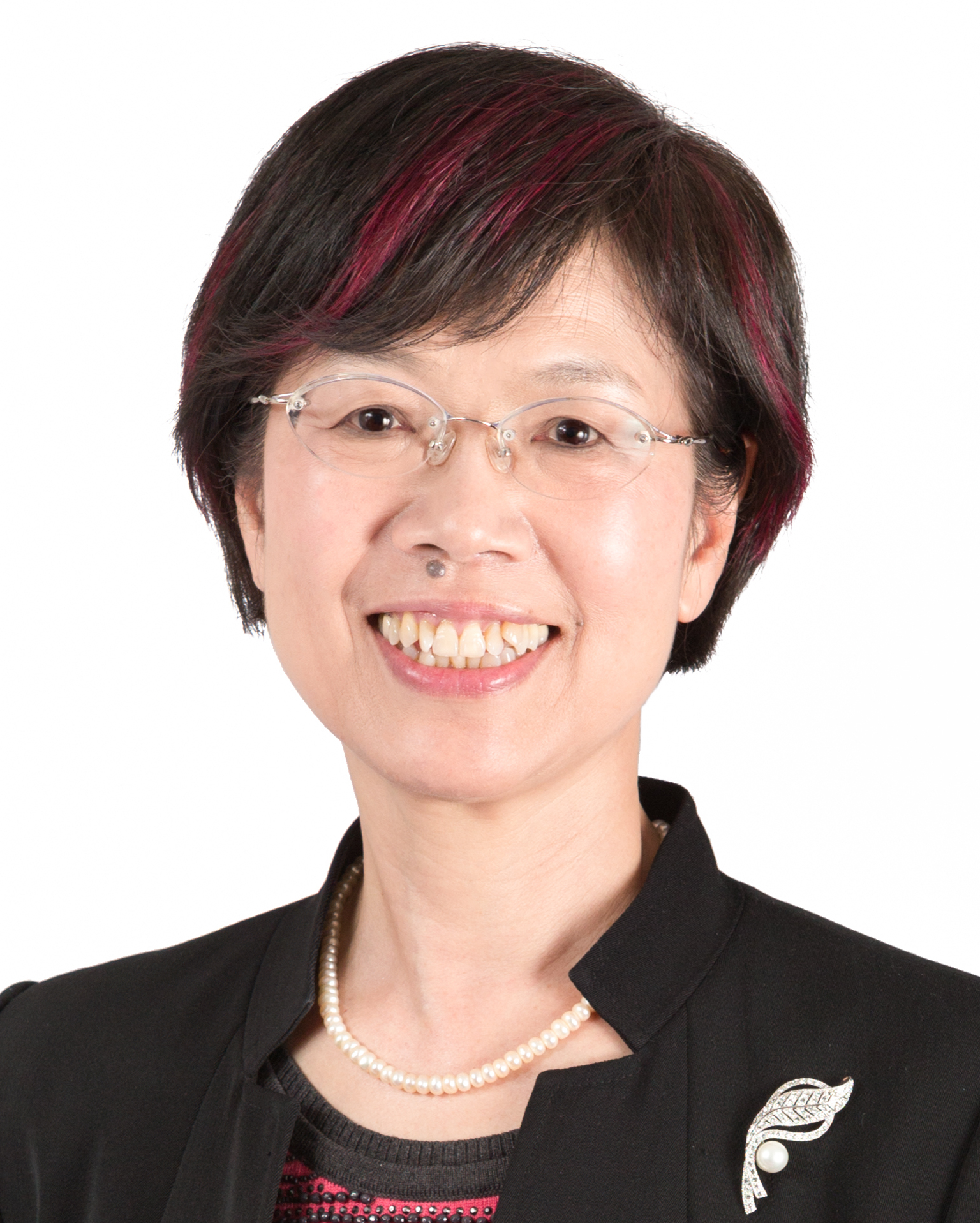

Member of the Legislative Yuan
- In office 1 February 2012 – 1 January 2020
- Constituency: National at-large

Personal details
- Born: 28 January 1955 (age 71) Changhua City, Changhua County, Taiwan
- Party: Democratic Progressive Party
- Spouse: Remington Huang
- Education: National Taiwan University (LLB, LLM); Goethe University Frankfurt (PhD)

Yu Mei-nu (Chinese: 尤美女; pinyin: Yóu Měinǚ; born 28 January 1955) is a Taiwanese politician and lawyer. A member of the Democratic Progressive Party, she served in the Legislative Yuan from 2012 to 2020.

== Education and early career ==
Yu studied political science and law as a double major at National Taiwan University, where she earned LL.B. and LL.M. degrees. She then pursued doctoral studies in law in Germany at Goethe University Frankfurt. Yu subsequently worked as a lawyer.

== Political career ==
Yu is a staunch supporter for the legalization of same-sex marriage in Taiwan, and known for her advocacy of women's rights.

== Personal life ==
Yu is married to Remington Huang.

== Honors and recognition ==
In 2020 she was conferred the Ordre national du Mérite on behalf of the French President.
