= Taiwan Tongzhi Hotline Association =

National LGBT organization in Taiwan

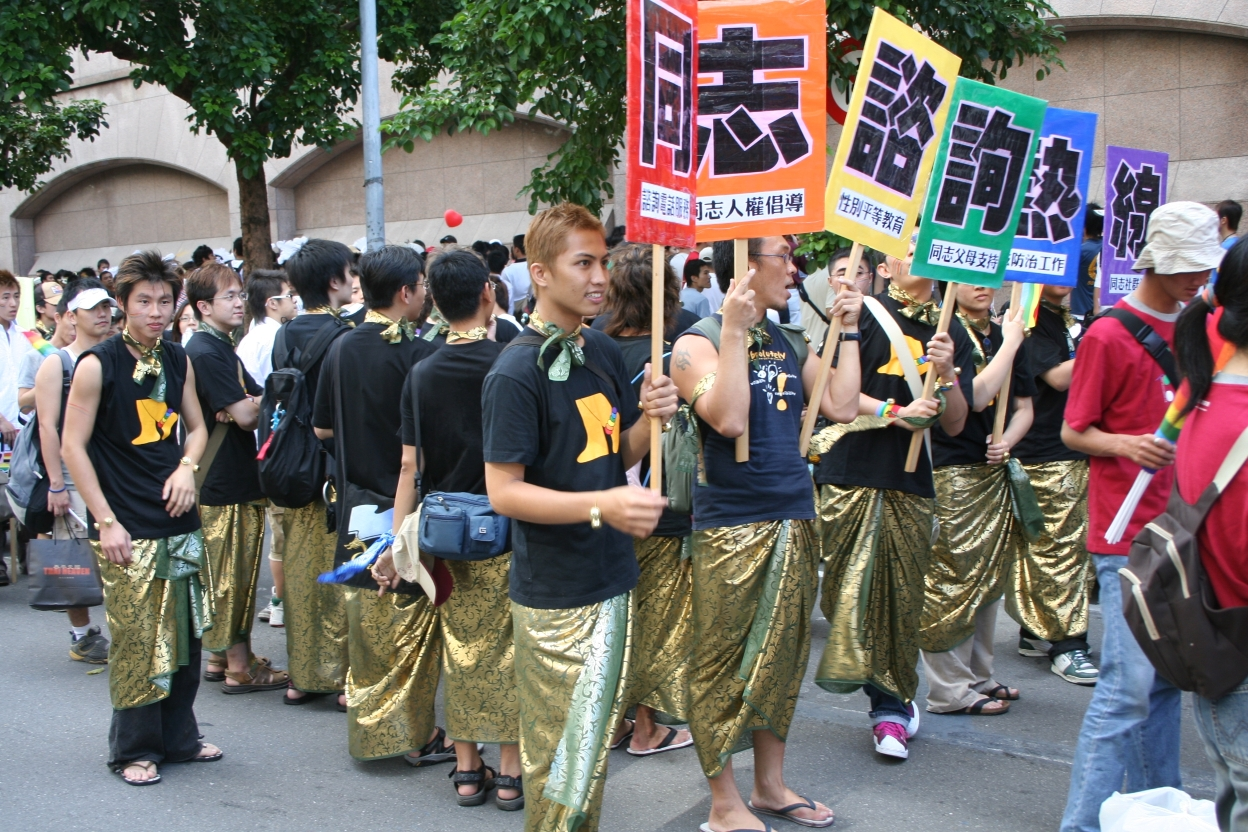
Workers of the Taiwan Tongzhi Hotline Association during the Taiwan Pride 2005 march, dressed in shiny skirts

Taiwan Tongzhi Hotline Association (TTHA; Chinese: 臺灣同志諮詢熱線協會) is an organization that provides the LGBT community with peer counseling, support networks, and a community resource center. It is the first LGBT non-governmental organization (NGO) registered in Taiwan.

TTHA was established in 1998 as a joint effort of four groups that focus on LGBT and gender issues, the Gay Counselors Association, Queer & Class, LGBT Civil Rights Alliance, and the Gay Teachers’ Alliance. The organization's current director-general is Yu Zhi-Yun (徐志雲).

== Services and activities ==
TTHA's tasks focus on counseling, cultural events, and the protection of LGBT rights including:

- Counseling on gender identity
- Counseling for LGBT relationships
- Counseling on gay rights issues
- Providing LGBT-related resources
- Hosting counseling and support groups for parents of LGBT children
- Organizing and training volunteers
- Providing safe sex education and HIV-prevention education
- Hosting LGBT-inclusive workshops for teachers
- Organizing and assisting Taiwan Pride (2005)
- Promoting Gender Equity Education Act (2004)

As part of its work, TTHA has been supporting the promotion of gender equity education in Taiwan, notably through the inclusion of gay rights and sexual orientation topics in the new mandatory curriculum for elementary and junior high school. By teaching youths about diversity in sexual orientation, TTHA and other like-minded organizations hope to enhance understanding and respect. TTHA also ties this to efforts to stem bullying in schools, which is often based on prejudices and stereotypes towards gender or sexual orientation. However, the inclusion of sexual orientation-related topics in school curriculum has met with opposition. TTHA and other gender and gay rights advocacy groups recently had to file a slander suit against a group stating that gender equity curriculum would promote "sexual openness" and same-sex marriage.
