= Linbian =

Rural township in Pingtung County, Taiwan

Coordinates: 22°26′N 120°31′E

Linbian Township 林邊鄉
- Rural township
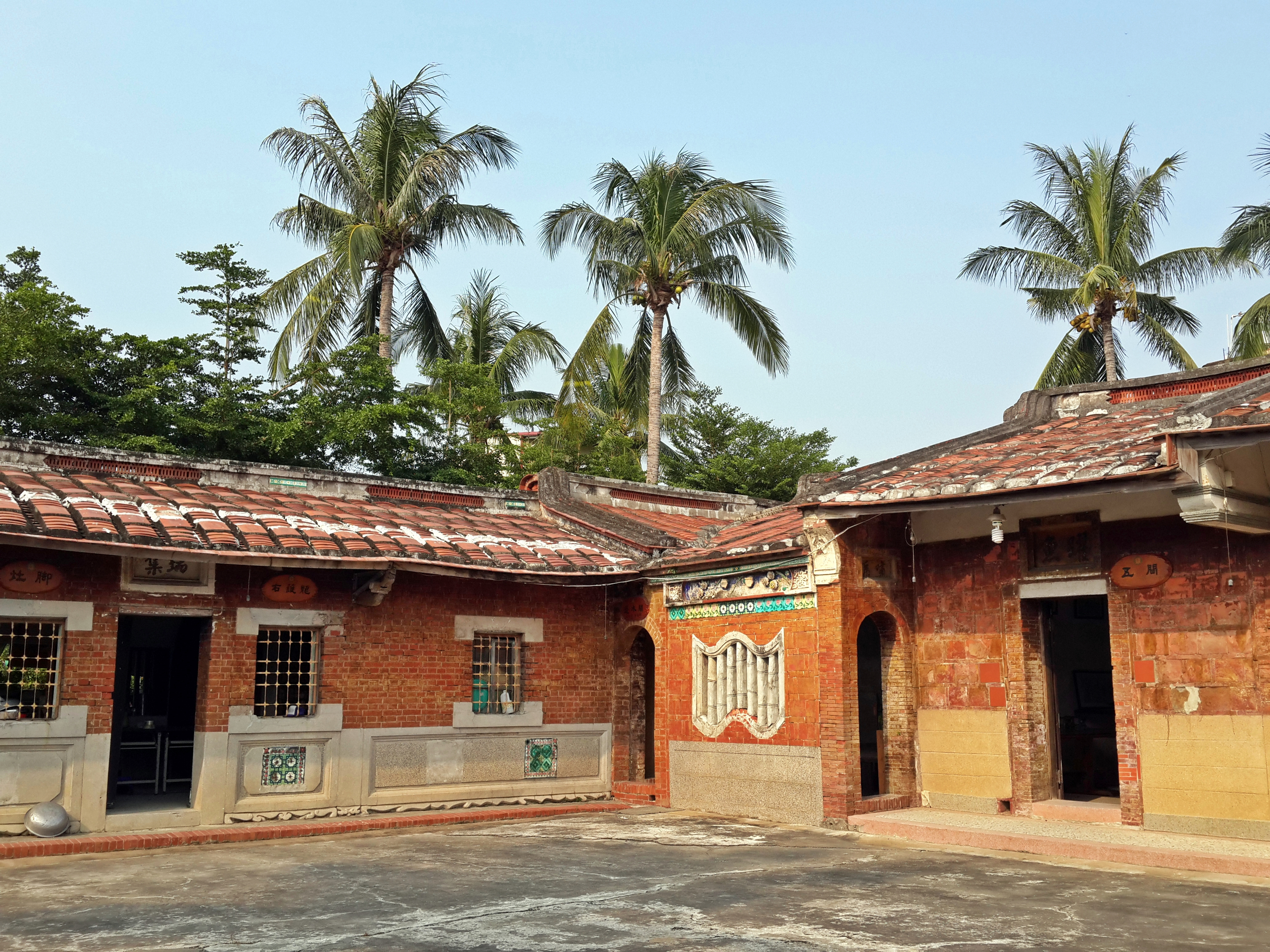

- Linbian Township in Pingtung County
- Location: Pingtung County, Taiwan

Area
  - Total: 16 km^{2} (6.2 sq mi)

Population (February 2024)
  - Total: 16,382
  - Density: 1,000/km^{2} (2,700/sq mi)

Linbian Township (Chinese: 林邊鄉; pinyin: Línbiān Xiāng; Wade–Giles: Lin^{2}-pian^{1} Hsiang^{1}; Pe̍h-ōe-jī: Nâ-piⁿ-hiong or Nâ-á-piⁿ [林仔邊]; Pha̍k-fa-sṳ: Lìm-piên-hiông) is a rural township in western Pingtung County, Taiwan. It lies at the mouth of the Linbian River, facing the Taiwan Strait. It is known for its year-round warm climate, seafood restaurants and its wax apples (lembus).

== Names ==
The area was called Pangsoya or Pangsoia during the Dutch era, and was later a small town called Pang-soh (Chinese: 放索; Pe̍h-ōe-jī: Pàng-soh). Early ethnic Chinese settlers called the area Nâ-á-piⁿ (林仔邊, lit. "wood's edge"). In 1920, the Japanese administration renamed the settlement Rinhen (Japanese: 林邊), officially Rinhen Village (林邊庄). In 1945, the Kuomintang regime retained the same Chinese characters which are read as Línbiān in Mandarin Chinese. However, the older Taiwanese pronunciation of Nâ-á-piⁿ continues to be commonly used.

== History ==
In 1951, Nanzhou Township was separated from Linbian.

== Geography ==
- Area: 15.62 square kilometres (6.03 sq mi)
- Population: 16,382 people (February 2024)

=== Climate ===
Like the rest of Southern Taiwan, Linbian is located within the tropics and has a tropical wet and dry climate. Due to its location, it is considered to be one of the warmest townships of Taiwan having the smallest temperature variations between seasons in the country (along with other various townships in Pingtung) because it is both located at a low latitude on the central Pingtung plains and also just above the Hengchun Peninsula which therefore does not share the peninsula's temperate climate caused by its sea currents. The coldest month is January and the warmest month is July, with an average daily mean of 21°C (70°F) and 28°C (82°F) respectively. Although statistically the average highs during "winter" varies around 26°C (79°F), temperatures exceeding 29°C (84°F) during the afternoon are not uncommon even in January.

Due to the warm and mostly windless weather, Linbian is famous for growing some of the best wax apples (lembus) in Taiwan, with one of the longest harvest seasons in the country, therefore it is nicknamed "the wax apple township" (蓮霧之鄉).

Climate data for Central Pingtung (Fangliao Township) (1981–2010)
Month	Jan	Feb	Mar	Apr	May	Jun	Jul	Aug	Sep	Oct	Nov	Dec	Year
Mean daily maximum °C (°F)	26.7 (80.1)	27.8 (82.0)	29.1 (84.4)	30.5 (86.9)	31.8 (89.2)	32.6 (90.7)	33.3 (91.9)	33.0 (91.4)	32.5 (90.5)	31.1 (88.0)	29.0 (84.2)	28.2 (82.8)	30.5 (86.8)
Mean daily minimum °C (°F)	16.1 (61.0)	17.1 (62.8)	19.5 (67.1)	22.6 (72.7)	24.9 (76.8)	26.0 (78.8)	26.5 (79.7)	26.2 (79.2)	25.6 (78.1)	24.2 (75.6)	21.3 (70.3)	17.5 (63.5)	22.3 (72.1)

== Administrative divisions ==
The township comprises 10 villages: Guanglin, Linbian, Qifeng, Renhe, Shuili, Tiancuo, Yongle, Zengan, Zhonglin and Zhulin.

== Tourist attractions ==
- Linbian River

== Transportation ==
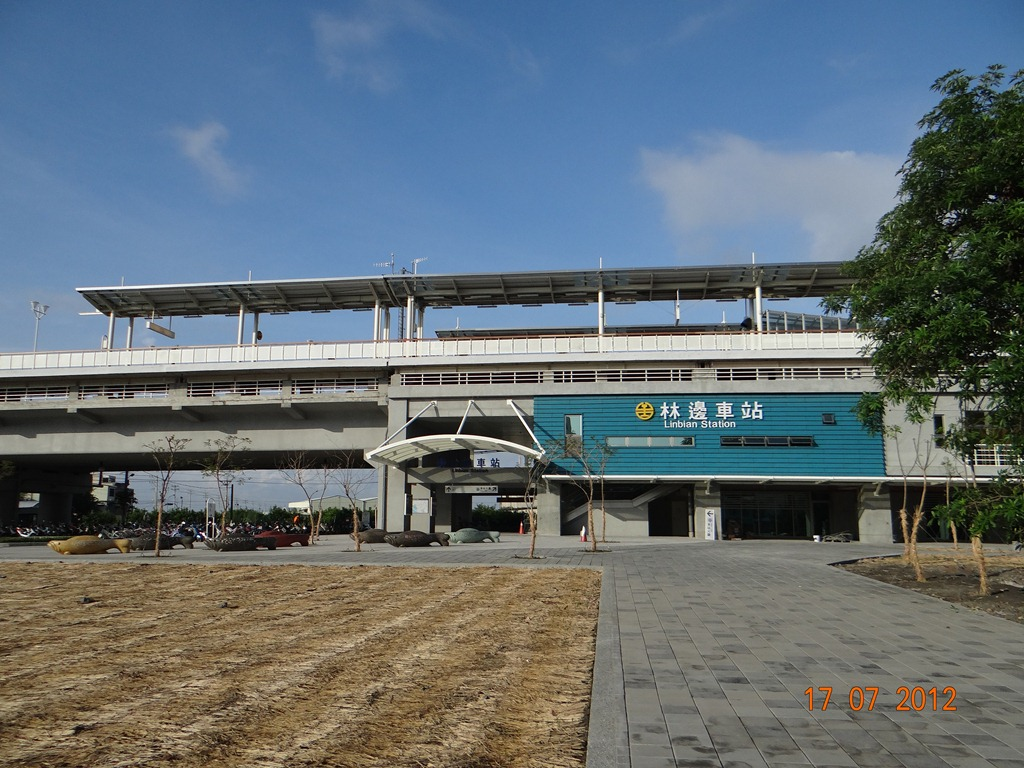
Linbian Station

- TR Linbian Station
- TR Zhen'an Station

== Notable natives ==
- Tsao Chi-hung, Magistrate of Pingtung County (2005 - 2014)
- Tsai Sen-lang, Founder and Superintendent of the Da-Dung Hospital in Kaohsiung
