= Chou Chun-mi =

Taiwanese politician

- 周春米
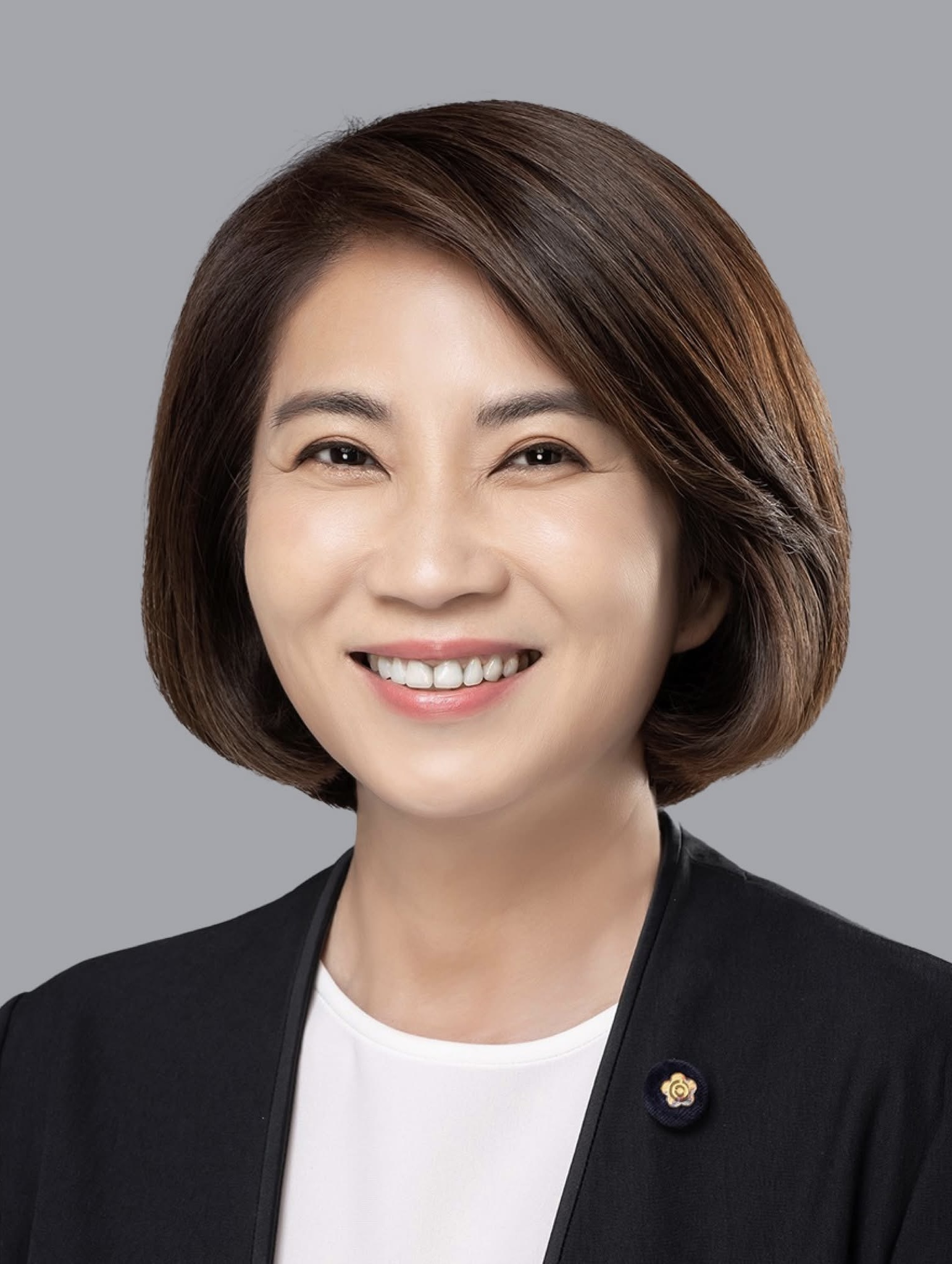
- Official portrait, 2022

13th Magistrate of Pingtung
- Incumbent
- Assumed office 25 December 2022
- Preceded by: Pan Men-an

Member of the Legislative Yuan
- In office 1 February 2016 – 25 December 2022
- Succeeded by: Chen Ching-min
- Constituency: Party-list (Democratic Progressive Party)

Personal details
- Born: 1 November 1966 (age 59) Pingtung City, Pingtung County, Taiwan
- Party: Democratic Progressive Party
- Education: National Taiwan University (LLB)

Chou Chun-mi (Chinese: 周春米; pinyin: Zhōu Chūnmǐ; Wade–Giles: Chou^{1} Chun^{1}-mi^{3}; born 1 November 1966) is a Taiwanese politician and lawyer who has been the 13th magistrate of Pingtung County since 2022. A member of the Democratic Progressive Party (DPP), she served in the Legislative Yuan from 2016 to 2022.

== Early life and education ==
Chou was born on 1 November 1966 in Pingtung City, Taiwan. Her father, Chou Hui-huang (周輝煌), was affiliated with the Kuomintang and served on the Pingtung County Council in the 1970s.

Chou obtained her bachelor's degree in law from National Taiwan University. She was a judge for seven years in the Pingtung and Kaohsiung district courts, and a lawyer for fifteen. During her legal career, Chou often provided counsel to the DPP. She also represented families of people drowned in the Shuangyuan Bridge collapse caused by Typhoon Morakot in 2009.

== Political career ==
=== Legislative Yuan ===
Chou won election to the Legislative Yuan via the Democratic Progressive Party proportional representation party list in 2016 and 2020. Chou participated in legislative questioning regarding topics related to Taiwanese indigenous people and the foreign relations of Taiwan during her first year in office. During the 2018 local elections, Chou claimed that Hsu Hsin-ying's magisterial campaign was attempting to buy votes. During the 2020 presidential election, she asserted that Kuomintang candidate Han Kuo-yu was deceiving voters regarding the source of his wealth. Over the course of her legislative tenure, Chou has opposed nuclear power, called for environmental cleanup efforts, and offered medical diplomacy to Japan during the COVID-19 pandemic.

==== Committee leadership ====
In September 2018, Chou and fellow legislator Lin Wei-chou were elected co-chairs of the Judiciary and Organic Laws and Statutes Committee. As committee co-chair, Chou expressed support for amendments to the Court Organic Act and the Administrative Court Organization Act, which permitted the establishment of collegiate grand chambers, which would lessen the possibility of courts issuing conflicting rulings. She retained the post in another election held in February 2019. In January 2022, Chou was elected to head the Constitutional Amendment Committee, a decision protested by Kuomintang legislators, who did not arrive in time to participate in the leadership vote. The Kuomintang then boycotted a committee hearing due to the disagreement over leadership. Chou called attention to Kuomintang boycotts of bills seeking to lower the voting age to eighteen. The bill passed the legislature, but failed a referendum.

==== Sponsored bills ====
In 2018, Chou co-sponsored a national defense bill requiring government contractors to use a portion of governmental funds on defense-related research and development. In 2019, she sponsored amendments to the Code of Criminal Procedure introducing codified travel restrictions for persons of interest. Later that year, Chou moved for the Legal Aid Foundation to investigate and report on reasons that a majority of indigenous people unable to pay legal fees were refusing the foundation's legal aid. The following year, Chou sponsored amendments to the Political Donations Act, permitting events related to recall elections to receive monetary donations, and another set of changes to Article 87 of the Criminal Code, extending the psychiatric custody limit to fourteen years.

=== Pingtung County magistracy ===
Chou won the DPP nomination for the Pingtung County magistracy in polls also featuring Chuang Jui-hsiung and Chung Chia-pin facing off against Su Ching-chuan. Chou was elected to office after winning the 2022 Pingtung County magistrate election held on 26 November 2022. In addition to Su, Chou faced New Power Party candidate Chan Chih-chun. During the election, SET News conflated Chou's vote count with Su's, making it seem as if Chou had lost. Su's subsequent challenge of Chou's electoral victory was dismissed by the Pingtung District Court. Following the dismissal of Su's petition, Chou took office on 25 December 2022. Chen Ching-min assumed Chou's vacant legislative seat.

2022 Pingtung County magisterial results
No.	Candidate	Party	Votes	Percentage
1	Chan Chih-chun (詹智鈞)	New Power Party	19,156	4.32%
2	Su Ching-chuan	Kuomintang	206,460	46.59%
3	Chou Chun-mi	Democratic Progressive Party	217,537	49.09%
Registered voters			679,330	
Total voters			456,382	
Valid votes			443,153	
Invalid votes			13,229	
Voter turnout			67.18%	
