= Chen Ching-min =

Taiwanese nurse and politician

Chen Ching-min MLY
- 陳靜敏
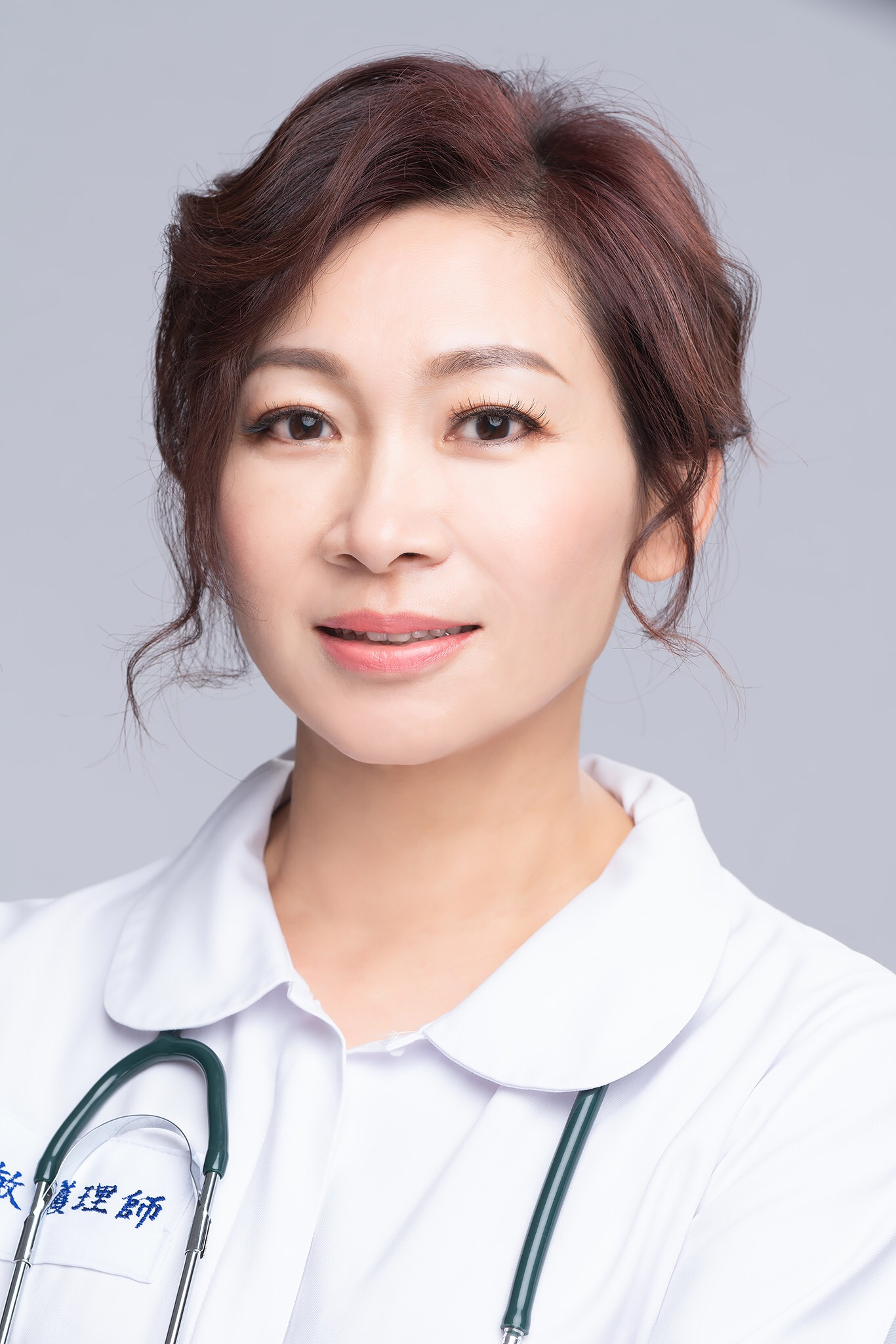
- Official portrait, 2018

Member of the Legislative Yuan
- In office 25 December 2022 – 31 January 2024
- Preceded by: Chou Chun-mi
- Constituency: Party-list
- In office 9 November 2018 – 31 January 2020
- Preceded by: Chen Chi-mai
- Constituency: Party-list

Personal details
- Born: 2 May 1966 (age 60) Taipei, Taiwan
- Party: Democratic Progressive Party
- Education: University of Illinois Chicago (BS); Indiana University (MPH, DNS, PhD)

Chen Ching-min (Chinese: 陳靜敏; born 2 May 1966) is a Taiwanese nurse, health scientist, and politician. The American Academy of Nursing and the Royal College of Surgeons in Ireland have awarded her fellowship. Politically, Chen is a member of the Democratic Progressive Party and has served as an appointed at-large member of the Legislative Yuan twice, from 2018 to 2020, and from 2022 to 2024.

== Early life and education ==
Chen was born in Taipei on 2 May 1966. Her father Chen An-bang, brother Chen Chien-ming, and niece Chen Su-yu are politicians. Chen's elder sister was a nurse, which inspired her to also pursue nursing.

Chen was educated in the United States. She graduated from the University of Illinois Chicago with a bachelor's degree in nursing in 1990. She then studied medicine at Indiana University Bloomington, where she earned a Master of Public Health (M.P.H.) and a Doctor of Nursing Science (D.N.S.) from the Indiana University School of Nursing in 1995. Her doctoral dissertation was titled, "Factors influencing cervical cancer screening in Taiwanese women: Use of Aday and Andersen's Access to Medical Care Model". In 2007, she completed a second doctorate, a Ph.D. in health policy, from Indiana University.

== Academic career ==
After completing her second doctorate in 2007, Chen became a professor at Taipei Medical University, where she established the School of Geriatric Nursing and Care Management that same year. Chen subsequently joined the National Cheng Kung University faculty in 2011. While serving as a legislator, Chen retained her position as deputy director of the Taiwan Nurses Association. In 2019, she was elected a fellow of the American Academy of Nursing.

After completing her partial term on the ninth Legislative Yuan, Chen resumed a professorship within the nursing department at the National Cheng Kung University. Chen has written a number of editorials on health-related topics, which were published in the Taipei Times. Chen became the first Taiwanese nurse to be named a fellow of the Royal College of Surgeons in Ireland in 2022.

== Political career ==
Chen was placed on the Democratic Progressive Party proportional representation party list for the 2016 legislative elections, but not elected to office. However, Chen was appointed an at-large member of the Legislative Yuan on 9 November 2018, succeeding Chen Chi-mai, who resigned his legislative seat to contest the 2018 Kaohsiung mayoral election. While serving as a legislator, Chen advocated for Taiwanese healthcare professionals to join international medical organizations so Taiwanese could increase their participation at the 72nd World Health Assembly. She also drew attention to a Chinese health official's actions toward a Taiwanese participant at the July 2019 meeting of the International Council of Nurses, in which the Chinese delegate flipped the Taiwanese representative's name badge over, to cover the flag of the Republic of China. She ranked seventeenth on the 2020 party list, and was not reelected. Following the election of Chou Chun-mi as Magistrate of Pingtung County, Chen was reappointed to the Legislative Yuan.
