= Pingtung Plain =

Plain in Taiwan

Pingtung Plain 屏東平原
- Plain
- Pingtung Plain (colored green)

- Location within Taiwan
- Coordinates: 22.704932°N 120.440999°E
- Location: Taiwan
- Geology: Plain

Pingtung Plain (Chinese: 屏東平原; pinyin: Píngdōng Píngyuán) is a plain area including parts of Pingtung County and Kaohsiung City in Taiwan. It includes the alluvial fan of Kaoping River, which forms the largest drainage area of rivers in Taiwan, and also passed by other shorter rivers such as Tungkang River, Linbian River and Shihwen River (士文溪). The plain faces the Taiwan Strait on the southwest, lies to the east of Kaohsiung City, and at the west of Central Mountain Range.

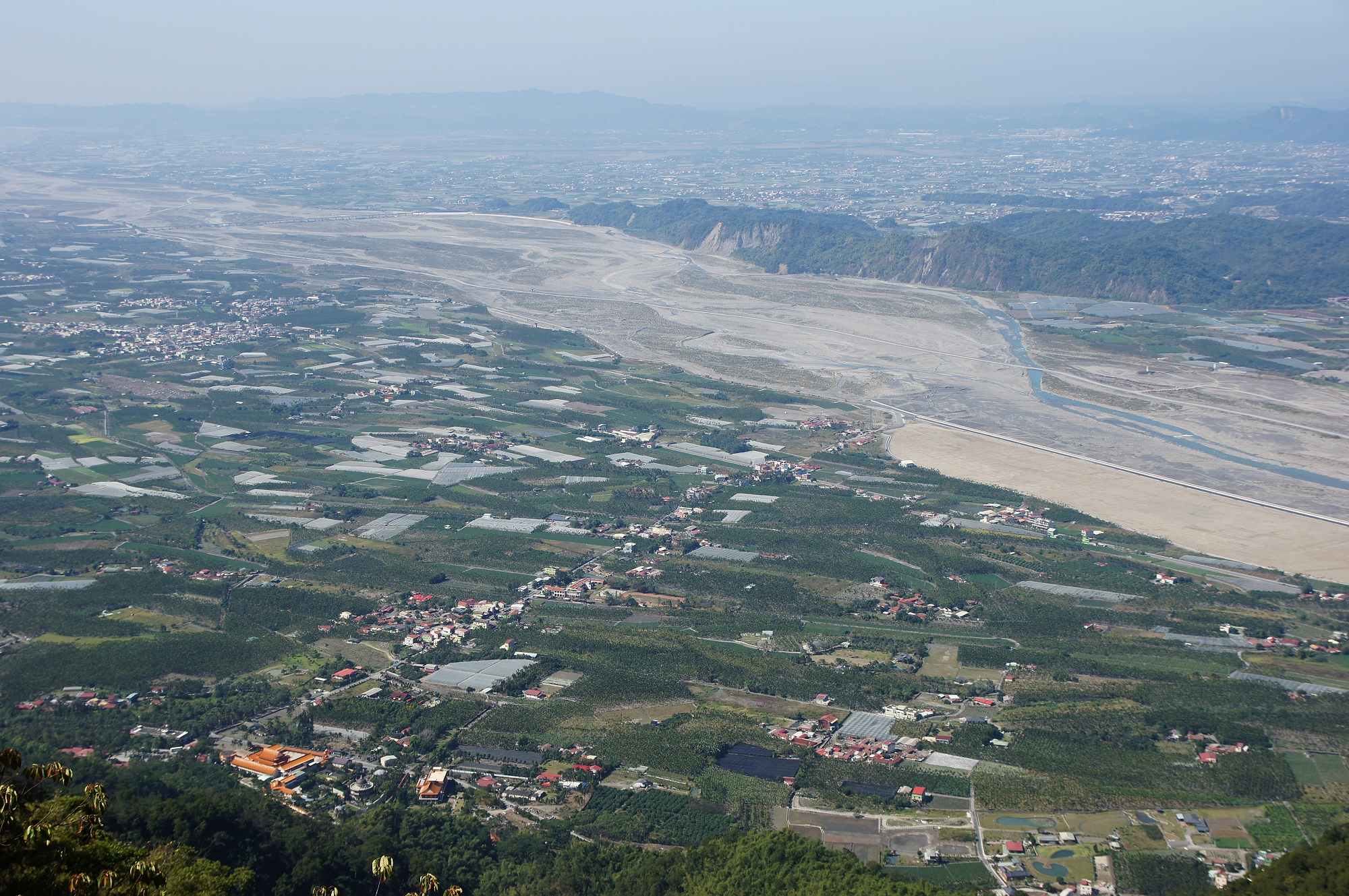

== See also ==
- Geography of Taiwan
