= Chung Chia-pin =

Taiwanese politician

Chung Chia-pin MLY
- 鍾佳濱
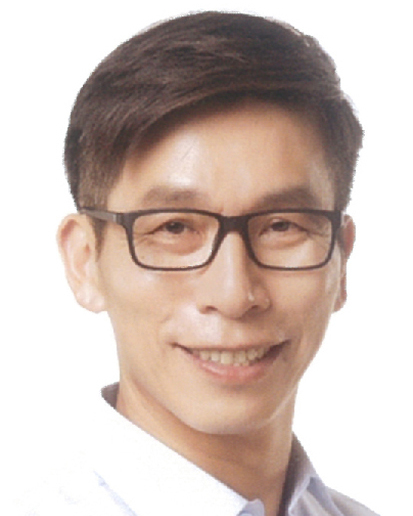

Member of the Legislative Yuan
- Incumbent
- Assumed office 1 February 2020
- Preceded by: Su Chen-ching
- Constituency: Pingtung County 1
- In office 1 February 2016 – 1 February 2020
- Preceded by: Wang Chin-shih
- Succeeded by: Su Chen-ching
- Constituency: Pingtung County 2

Member of the National Assembly
- In office 1996–2000

Personal details
- Born: February 23, 1965 (age 61) Pingtung County, Taiwan
- Party: Democratic Progressive Party
- Education: National Taiwan University (BA); National Pingtung University of Science and Technology (MS)

Chung Chia-pin (Chinese: 鍾佳濱; born 23 February 1965) is a Taiwanese politician. He served on the National Assembly from 1996 to 2000. He was elected to the Legislative Yuan in 2016.

== Education ==
Chung received his primary and secondary education from schools in his native Pingtung County. He then earned a bachelor's degree in history from National Taiwan University. He was active as a student activist in the 1980s and helped lead the Wild Lily movement of 1990. Chen later earned a Master of Science (M.S.) from National Pingtung University of Science and Technology.

== Political career ==
Chung was elected to the National Assembly in 1996 and served until 2000. During Su Chia-chyuan's tenure as Pingtung County Magistrate, Chung worked for Su as a secretary. Later, Chung worked for the Council for Cultural Affairs under chairwoman Tchen Yu-chiou. Chung has also served the Democratic Progressive Party as deputy secretary-general under Chang Chun-hsiung. In this position, he acted as spokesman for the party in the 2004 legislative elections, and offered to resign after the Pan-Green Coalition failed to win a majority. He joined the People Sovereignty Action Network and protested the 2010 signing of the Economic Cooperation Framework Agreement. By 2012, Chung had been named deputy magistrate of Pingtung under Tsao Chi-hung. Chung acted as Pingtung County Government spokesman during the 2014 Taiwan food scandal, accusing the Ministry of Health and Welfare of "setting up" Pingtung in a leak of confidential information to Ting Hsin International Group, one of the companies involved in the food scare.

He ran for a Pingtung County legislative seat in 2016, and won. In May 2016, Chung became one of the first ten legislators to support an amendment to the Act of Gender Equality in Employment intended to lengthen the period of maternity leave given to partners of unmarried women. Later that month, he was named the founding chairman of two legislative groups intended to further Taiwan's relations with European nations. In May 2017, Chung founded the "Renewable Power Promotion Alliance" alongside fellow legislators Chen Man-li, Su Chih-fen, and Yang Yao.

Chung has expressed support for the maintenance of military dependents' villages and asked both the Ministries of Education and National Defense to help retired military instructors find jobs. He has also attempted to lift legal restrictions on foreign workers in Taiwan. With regards to transportation, Chung preferred that Taiwan's fuel tax be calculated as a function of distance driven. In the field of education, he has opposed forcing private educational institutions in Taiwan to publicize financial expenditures. Following a 2017 Constitutional Court ruling on the status of same-sex marriage in Taiwan, Chung stated, "We do not think people in China are seeking different values than people in Taiwan. It is the result of a different political system and democratic practices over the years."

Chung is the chair of Taiwan's Taiwan-Israel Congressional Association, which was established in February 2024 to increase ties between Taiwan and Israel. The group was formed as the civilian death toll from the Israeli invasion of the Gaza Strip mounted. Taiwanese civil society groups called on Chung to cut ties with Israel unless there is a ceasefire.
