= Hengchun Peninsula =

Peninsula in Southern Taiwan

Coordinates: 22.2°N 120.8°E

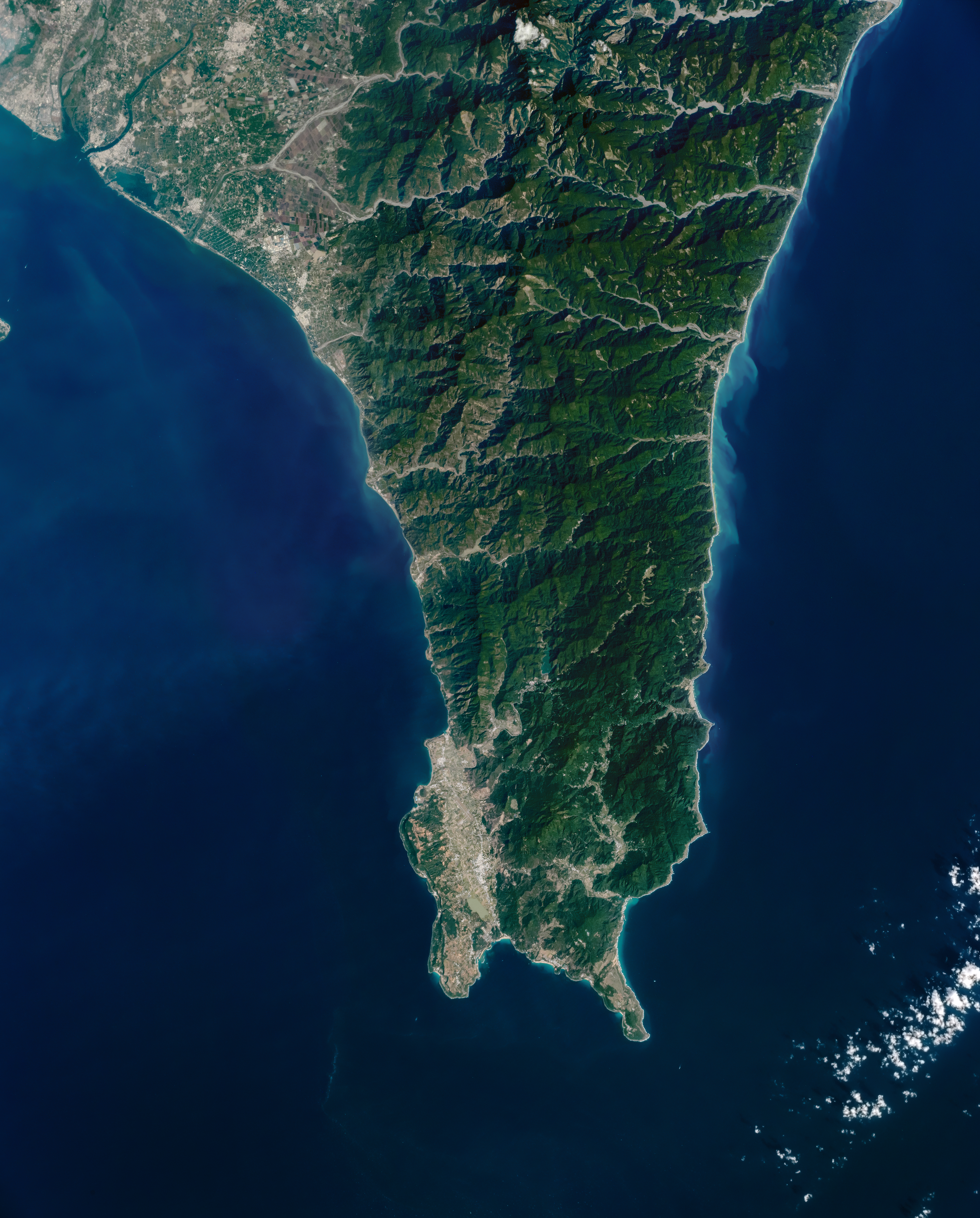
Hengchun Peninsula

Hengchun Peninsula (Chinese: 恆春半島) is a peninsula located in Pingtung County, Taiwan, and is named after Hengchun Township. It is the southernmost part of Taiwan. The Hengchun Peninsula is surrounded by the sea on three sides: the Taiwan Strait to the west, the Bashi Channel to the south, and the Pacific Ocean to the east. Only the northern end of the peninsula connects to the main island of Taiwan. Due to the maritime influence, the climate is moderated by the sea's moisture. The peninsula's terrain is mostly below 800 meters in height, a result of the steep descent from the Central Mountain Range, allowing sea breezes to pass through easily. These environmental factors distinguish it from the main island of Taiwan.

The Hengchun Peninsula is also a popular tourist destination, known for Kenting National Park. However, due to its geographic location and terrain, it is often affected by typhoons.

== Range ==
To the west, the boundary is marked by Fangliao, proceeding upstream along Linbian River (Lili River to Yishan), following the eastern slope of Mount Dawu (the potential boundary where cypress forests are distributed, which is the lower limit of mid-altitude vegetation), and then eastward to follow the Zhiben River to Zhiben.

== See also ==
- List of peninsulas
