= Tsao Chi-hung =

Taiwanese politician

- 曹啟鴻
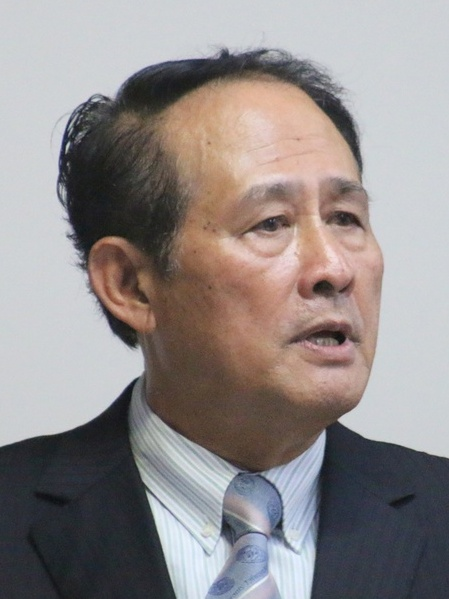

Minister of the Council of Agriculture
- In office 20 May 2016 – 8 February 2017
- Prime Minister: Lin Chuan
- Deputy: Chen Chi-chung
- Preceded by: Chen Chih-ching
- Succeeded by: Lin Tsung-hsien

Magistrate of Pingtung County
- In office 20 December 2005 – 25 December 2014
- Deputy: Chung Chia-pin
- Preceded by: Su Jia-chyuan; Wu Ying-wen (acting)
- Succeeded by: Pan Men-an

Member of the Legislative Yuan
- In office 1 February 1999 – 31 January 2005
- Constituency: Pingtung County

Member of the National Assembly
- In office 1992–1994

Personal details
- Born: 1 March 1948 (age 78) Linbian, Pingtung County, Taiwan
- Party: Democratic Progressive Party
- Education: Chinese Culture University (BA); National Kaohsiung Normal University (MA)

Tsao Chi-hung (Chinese: 曹啟鴻; pinyin: Cáo Qǐhóng; born 1 March 1948) is a Taiwanese politician. A member of the Democratic Progressive Party, he was a member of the National Assembly from 1992 to 1994 and has served two terms each in the Legislative Yuan and as Pingtung County Magistrate. Between 2016 and 2017, Tsao was minister of agriculture.

== Life before politics ==
Born in Linbian Township, Pingtung County, Tsao received his bachelor's degree from Chinese Culture University and his master's degree in education from National Kaohsiung Normal University. He worked as the Director of Academic Affairs at Linbian Junior High School from 1978 to 1994.

== Political career ==
Tsao was first elected to political office in 1992 as a member of the National Assembly. In 1994 he was elected as a councillor in the Taiwan Provincial Council, at which point he left his career in education to become a full-time politician. In 1998 Tsao won a seat in the Legislative Yuan representing the Democratic Progressive Party; he was reelected in 2001. In 2004 the Pingtung County magistrate Su Jia-chyuan was appointed Minister of the Interior, leaving the way clear for Tsao to run for county magistrate in 2005. After winning the election in 2005 Tsao was reelected in 2009. He did not stand for reelection in 2014.

After the DPP's landslide win in the 2016 9-in-1 elections, President Tsai Ing-wen appointed Tsao Agriculture Minister in her first cabinet. Tsao stepped down from the position in February 2017.
