= Pan Men-an =

Taiwanese politician

Pan Men-an MLY
- 潘孟安
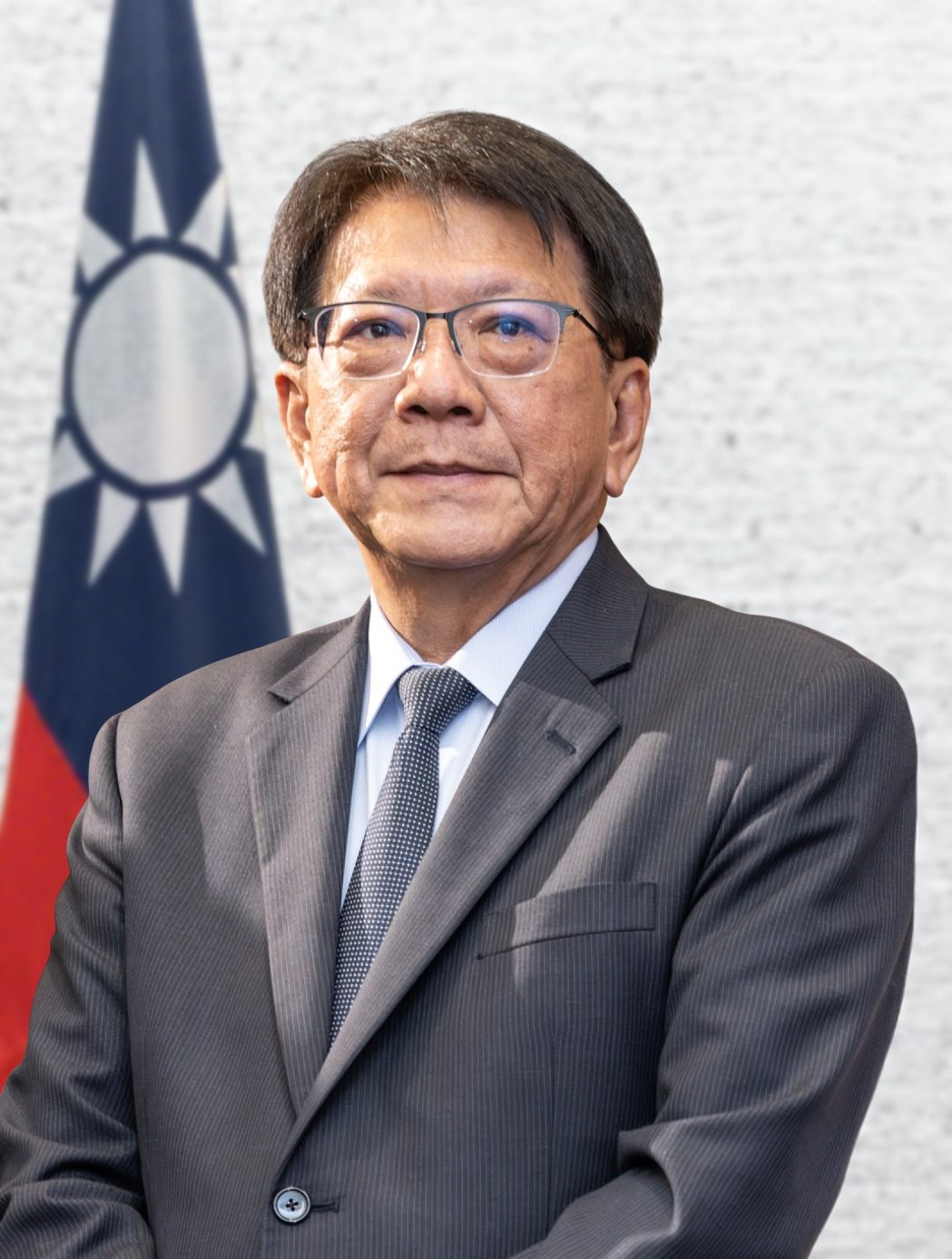
- Pan in 2026

39th Secretary-General to the President
- Incumbent
- Assumed office 20 May 2024
- President: Lai Ching-te
- Deputy: Mark Ho; Xavier Chang; Cheng Chun-shen
- Preceded by: Lin Chia-lung

12th Magistrate of Pingtung
- In office 25 December 2014 – 25 December 2022
- Preceded by: Tsao Chi-hung
- Succeeded by: Chou Chun-mi

Member of the Legislative Yuan
- In office 1 February 2005 – 25 December 2014
- Succeeded by: Chuang Jui-hsiung
- Constituency: Pingtung County III

Personal details
- Born: 15 August 1963 (age 62) Checheng, Pingtung County, Taiwan
- Party: Democratic Progressive Party
- Education: I-Shou University (BA); National Sun Yat-sen University; National Kaohsiung Normal University (MA); University of Hawaiʻi at Mānoa (MBA)

Pan Men-an (Chinese: 潘孟安; pinyin: Pān Mèng'ān; Wade–Giles: Pʻan^{1} Mêng^{4}-an^{1}; Pe̍h-ōe-jī: Phoaⁿ Bēng-an; born 15 August 1963) is a Taiwanese politician. He was the magistrate of Pingtung County from 25 December 2014 to 25 December 2022. He joined the campaign team of the 2024 presidential candidate of Democratic Progressive Party, and assumed the role as the Secretary-General to the President in May 2023.

== Early life and education ==
Pan was born to a fishermen's family. He was educated at I-Shou University, National Sun Yat-sen University, and graduated from the graduate institute of continuing education at National Kaohsiung Normal University. He also earned a Master of Business Administration (MBA) from the University of Hawaiʻi at Mānoa.

== Career life ==
=== Pingtung County Council ===
Pan became the member of Pingtung County Council on 1 March 1998 and served two terms until 28 February 2006.

=== Legislative Yuan ===
Pan was elected as the member of Legislative Yuan after the 2004 Republic of China legislative election held on 11 December 2004 and served from 1 February 2005 until 31 January 2008.

Pan was elected again as the member representing the Democratic Progressive Party for Pingtung County 3rd electoral district after winning the 2008 Republic of China legislative election held on 12 January 2008 and served from 1 February 2008 until 31 January 2012.

No.	Candidate	Party	Votes	Ratio	Elected
1	Pan Men-an	Democratic Progressive Party	59,896	51.30%	Yes
2	Su Ching-chuan	Kuomintang	50,195	43.00%	
3	Chou Bi-yun (周碧雲)	Independent	6,653	5.70%	

He was reelected again to the office after winning the 2012 Republic of China legislative election held on 14 January 2012 and served from 1 February 2012 until 25 December 2014.

== Magistrate of Pingtung County ==
=== 2014 Pingtung County magistrate election ===
Pan was elected as the Magistrate of Pingtung County after winning the 2014 Pingtung County magistrate election held on 29 November 2014.

2014 Pingtung County Magistrate Election Result
No.	Candidate	Party	Votes	Percentage
1	Chien Tai-lang	KMT	182,027	37.07%
2	Pan Meng-an	DPP	308,953	62.93%

=== 2018 Pingtung County magistrate election ===
2018 Democratic Progressive Party Pingtung County magistrate primary results
Candidates	Place	Result
Pan Men-an	Nominated	Walkover

2018 Pingtung County mayoral results
No.	Candidate	Party	Votes	Percentage
1	Li Hu-jen (李鎔任)	Independent	9,819	2.09%
2	Su Ching-chuan	Kuomintang	197,518	42.01%
3	Pan Men-an	Democratic Progressive Party	262,809	55.90%
Total voters			689,393	
Valid votes			470,146	
Invalid votes				
Voter turnout			68.20%	

Political offices
Preceded by Tsao Chi-hung	Magistrate of Pingtung County; 2014–2022	Succeeded by Chou Chun-mi
