= Hwang Jau-yuan =

Taiwanese jurist (born 1962)

- 黃昭元
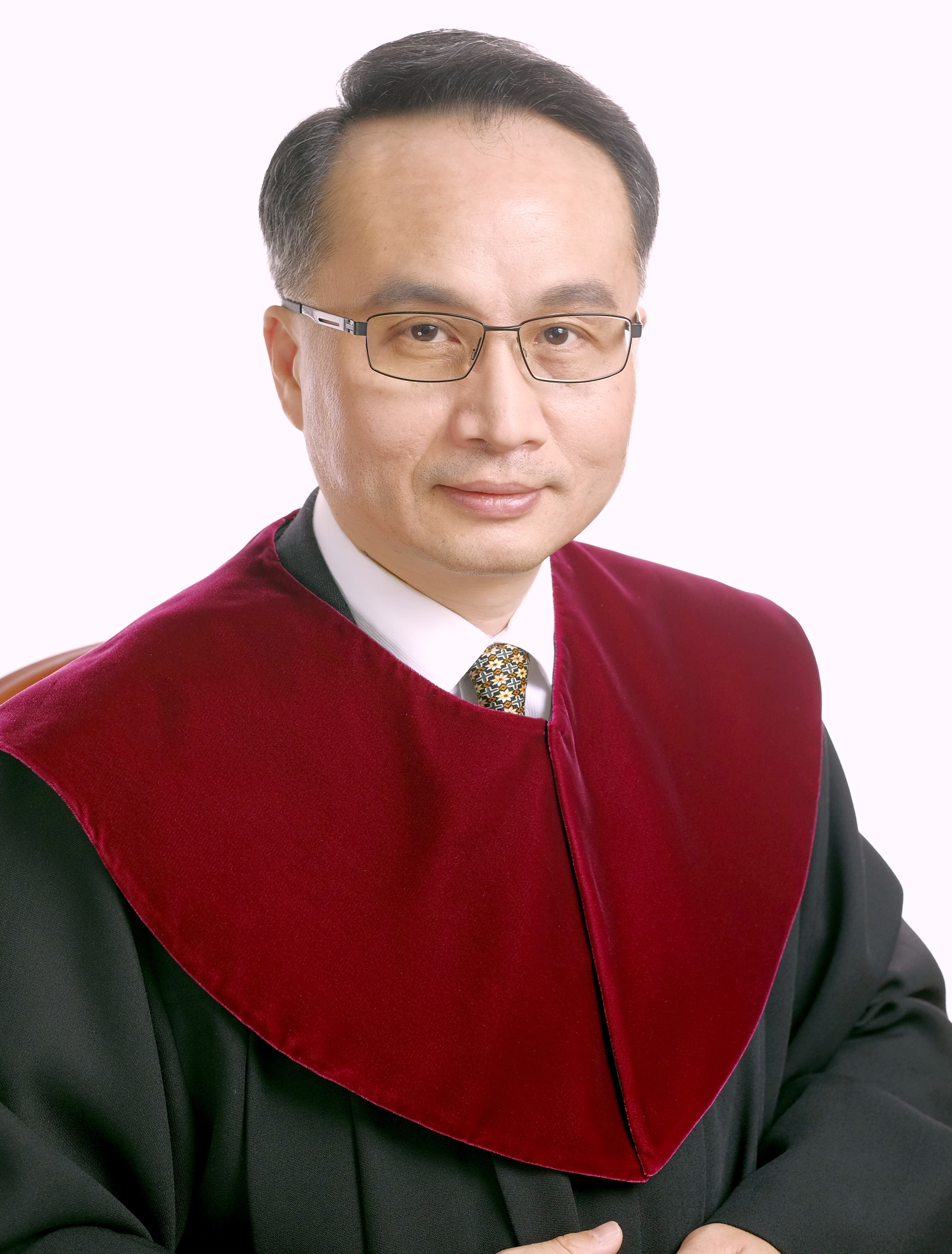
- Official portrait, 2016

Permanent Representative of Taiwan to the World Trade Organization
- Incumbent
- Assumed office 29 April 2025
- Preceded by: Lo Chang-fa

Justice of the Constitutional Court of Taiwan
- In office 11 November 2016 – 31 October 2024
- Nominated by: Tsai Ing-wen

Personal details
- Born: 28 September 1962 (age 62); Taiwan
- Education: National Taiwan University (LLB, LLM); Harvard University (LLM, SJD)

Hwang Jau-yuan (Chinese: 黃昭元; pinyin: Huáng Zhāoyuán; born 28 September 1962) is a Taiwanese jurist who served as a justice of the Constitutional Court of Taiwan, the country's highest court, from 2016 to 2024. In 2025, Hwang was appointed as Taiwan's representative to the World Trade Organization.

== Early life and education ==
Hwang was born in 1962. He graduated from National Taiwan University (NTU) in 1984 with a Bachelor of Laws (LL.B.) and earned a Master of Laws (LL.M.) from the university in 1989. After completing his master's degree, Hwang entered private practice as an associate attorney at Formosa Transnational Attorneys-at-Law, a law firm based in Taipei, Taiwan, and worked there from September 1988 to June 1990.

Hwang later received a scholarship to study in the United States at Harvard University, where he earned a second LL.M. in 1991 and a Doctor of Juridical Science (S.J.D.) in 1995 from Harvard Law School. His doctoral thesis, published in June 1995, was titled, "Constitutional Change and Political Transition in Taiwan Since 1986: The Role of Legal Institutions".

== Career ==
In August 1995, Hwang became a professor at the College of Law at National Taiwan University, where he is an authority on constitutional law and international law. He began as a lecturer at NTU from 1995 to 1996, then was an associate professor of law from 1996 to 2004, and was promoted to a full professor of law at NTU in August 2004. He served as the director of NTU Law's Institute of Interdisciplinary Integrated Law. From 24 June 2013 to 25 July 2013, Hwang was a visiting scholar at the University of Tübingen in Germany. He specialized in constitutional and international law, and in fields related to human rights.

During the 2004 election cycle, Hwang served on the Central Election Commission. In 2016, Hwang was the youngest grand justice nominated by Tsai Ing-wen. His nomination was approved by a Legislative Yuan vote of 72 to 33, and he was inaugurated as a justice of the Judicial Yuan on 11 November 2016. In 2017, he was among the justices of the court to rule in favor of legalizing same-sex marriage in the Judicial Yuan's Interpretation No. 748.

Following the retirement of Lo Chang-fa, Hwang was appointed Taiwanese representative to the World Trade Organization in April 2025.
