= Same-sex marriage in Taiwan =

Same-sex marriage has been legal in Taiwan since 24 May 2019, making it the first country in Asia to legalize same-sex marriage. On 24 May 2017, the Constitutional Court ruled that the marriage law was unconstitutional, holding that the constitutional rights to equality and freedom of marriage guarantee same-sex couples the right to marry under the Taiwanese Constitution. The ruling gave the Legislative Yuan two years to bring the law into compliance, after which registration of such marriages would come into force automatically. In November 2018, the Taiwanese electorate voted in favor of referendums aimed at preventing the recognition of same-sex marriages within the existing Civil Code. In response, the government confirmed it would not amend the Civil Code but would instead prepare a separate law for same-sex couples.

On 20 February 2019, a draft bill was published that would allow same-sex couples to establish a "permanent union of intimate and exclusive nature for the purpose of living a common life." The Executive Yuan passed it the following day, sending it to the Legislative Yuan for fast-tracked review. The bill was passed on 17 May, and President Tsai Ing-wen signed it on 22 May, with the law taking effect on 24 May 2019. In 2023, same-sex couples were granted the right to adopt. In 2024, cross-strait couples were also granted the right to marry, subject to the same complex legal procedures as heterosexual couples.

The Taiwanese Civil Code defines marriage as a union between a man and a woman, and still contains many gender-specific terms like "husband and wife". The law governing assisted reproduction limits access to ART, including IVF, to legally married heterosexual couples and specifically excludes same-sex female couples and single women.

== Partnership registration ==
Map of the subdivisions of Taiwan that had opened registration for same-sex couples before 24 May 2019 Registration open to same-sex couples No registration

Same-sex couples are able to legally register their relationship through a special "partnership registration" (Chinese: 同性伴侶註記) (Note: In some of Taiwan's national and local languages: Mandarin: tóngxìng bànlǚ zhù jì, pronounced [tʰʊ̌ŋɕîŋ pânlỳ ʈʂû tɕî]; Taiwanese: tông-sèng phōaⁿ-lū chù kì; Hakka: thùng-sin phân-lí chu ki; Matsu: dùng-séng puâng-lṳ̄ ció gé) in 18 of Taiwan's cities and counties that account for 94 percent of the country's population. However, the rights afforded in these partnerships are very limited; there are as many as 498 exclusive rights related to marriage that include property rights, social welfare and medical care. A special certificate is issued to the couple, providing the partners with some limited rights, notably the ability to consent to surgery for a partner and parental leave. Requirements vary by local government, with some requiring both partners to be residents of the city or county.

In May 2015, the special municipality of Kaohsiung announced a plan to allow same-sex couples to mark their partners in civil documents for reference purposes, although it would not be applicable to the healthcare sector. This policy of "partnership registrations" went into force on May 20. Taiwan LGBT Rights Advocacy, an NGO, criticized the plan as merely a measure to "make fun of" the community without having any substantive effect. In June 2015, Taipei became the second special municipality in Taiwan to open registration for same-sex couples, followed by Taichung on 1 October 2015. In December 2015, the city governments of Taipei and Kaohsiung announced an agreement to share their same-sex partnership registries with each other, effective from 1 January 2016, allowing for partnerships registered in one special municipality to be recognized in the other. This marked the first time that same-sex partnerships had been recognized outside of single-municipality boundaries.

Activists protested on 18 December 2015 inside the Tainan City Council to lobby for a similar registry in Tainan. On 27 January 2016, Mayor Lai Ching-te announced that same-sex couples would be allowed to officially register their partnership in the city, starting on 1 February 2016. New Taipei also opened registration for same-sex couples on 1 February 2016. On 23 February 2016, Mayor Twu Shiing-jer announced that Chiayi City would be following suit on 1 March 2016. Chiayi City became the first of the three provincial cities to recognize same-sex couples. On 28 January 2016, the Mayor of Taoyuan, Cheng Wen-tsan, said that he was open to the possibility of a registry. On 7 March 2016, Tang Hui-chen, director of the Department of Civil Affairs at the Taoyuan City Government, said that based on "gender equality, basic human rights and respect for same-sex relationships", the government had decided to allow same-sex couples to register as partners. The registration began on 14 March 2016, making Taoyuan the sixth as well as the last special municipality in Taiwan to officially recognize same-sex couples.

On 18 March 2016, the Changhua County Government declared that based on respect and tolerance for same-sex couples, Changhua County had decided to open registration for same-sex couples. Couples who wish to register must be at least twenty years old and at least one partner must be resident in the county. The first couple registered the day the registration came into effect, on 1 April 2016. Hsinchu County also established a partnership registration that day, followed by Yilan County on 20 May 2016, and Chiayi County on 20 October 2016.

On 26 May 2017, the Ministry of the Interior formally asked all local governments to open registration for same-sex couples. By 6 June, Hsinchu City, Kinmen County, Lienchiang County, Miaoli County, Nantou County and Pingtung County had announced their intention to comply, with household registration services to open later that month or early July. Keelung City followed suit on 3 July 2017, and by the next day three same-sex couples had registered in the city. On 3 July 2017, the Ministry of the Interior upgraded the nationwide household registration system to incorporate information about same-sex partnership registration into personal profiles.

Availability of same-sex partnership registrations by administrative divisions of Taiwan
Division	Starting date	Division	Starting date	Division	Starting date
Changhua County	1 April 2016	Kinmen County	3 July 2017	Tainan City	1 February 2016
Chiayi City	1 March 2016	Lienchiang County	3 July 2017	Taipei City	17 June 2015
Chiayi County	20 October 2016	Miaoli County	3 July 2017	Taitung County	—N/a
Hsinchu City	3 July 2017	Nantou County	26 June 2017	Taoyuan City	14 March 2016
Hsinchu County	1 April 2016	New Taipei City	1 February 2016	Yilan County	20 May 2016
Hualien County	—N/a	Penghu County	—N/a	Yunlin County	—N/a
Kaohsiung City	20 May 2015	Pingtung County	29 June 2017	Available in 18 out of 22 divisions	
Keelung City	3 July 2017	Taichung City	1 October 2015	Available in 18 out of 22 divisions	

Hualien County, Penghu County, Taitung County and Yunlin County did not open registration for same-sex couples. In September 2017, activists protested in Hualien and Taitung counties for the opening of registration services for same-sex couples.

Since the legalization of same-sex marriage in Taiwan on May 24, 2019, partnership registration is no longer available to Taiwanese couples and couples consisting of a Taiwanese national and a citizen of a country or territory where same-sex marriage is legal. Couples who have registered can choose to retain their partnership status or convert their union into a marriage. On May 25, 2020, the National Immigration Agency opened same-sex partnership registration to foreign couples. Deputy Minister of the Interior Chen Chwen-jing announced in May 2020 that the Ministry of the Interior was likely to abolish the partnership registration system in the near future, noting that many couples had converted their partnership into marriage by that time and that the system "effectively served no purpose anymore". Chen announced that the Ministry would wait until more couples had converted their relationship into marriage before taking a formal decision.

== Same-sex marriage ==
Laws regarding homosexuality in Asia Same-sex sexual activity legal Marriage performed Marriage recognized Other type of partnership Unregistered cohabitation No recognition of same-sex couples Ambiguous Restriction on freedom of expression, not enforced Severe restriction of association with arrests or detention Same-sex sexual activity illegal Prison, not enforced Prison Death penalty on books, not enforced Enforced death penalty

=== Early history ===
In 2003, the Executive Yuan proposed legislation opening marriage to same-sex couples, but the bill was rejected in 2006 and was not passed into law because of majority opposition from legislators, which included both members of the Democratic Progressive Party (DPP) and the Kuomintang (KMT).

In August 2012, two women participated in what the media called "Taiwan's first same-sex marriage ceremony". Around the same time, President Ma Ying-jeou, chairman of the governing Kuomintang, restated his respect for LGBT rights but said that public support was needed before the government could approve a same-sex marriage law. The Ministry of Justice's Department of Legal Affairs commissioned a study on legal recognitions of same-sex unions in Canada, Germany and France in 2012, but after pressure from critics, commissioned a further study for 2013 on the state of same-sex relationships in Asian countries for comparison. In 2012, Su Tseng-chang, chairman of the Democratic Progressive Party, expressed support for same-sex marriage. Despite some division within the party on the issue, DPP's victorious presidential candidate for the January 2016 election, Tsai Ing-wen, announced her support for same-sex marriage in November 2015. She was the first major party candidate to express support for same-sex marriage.

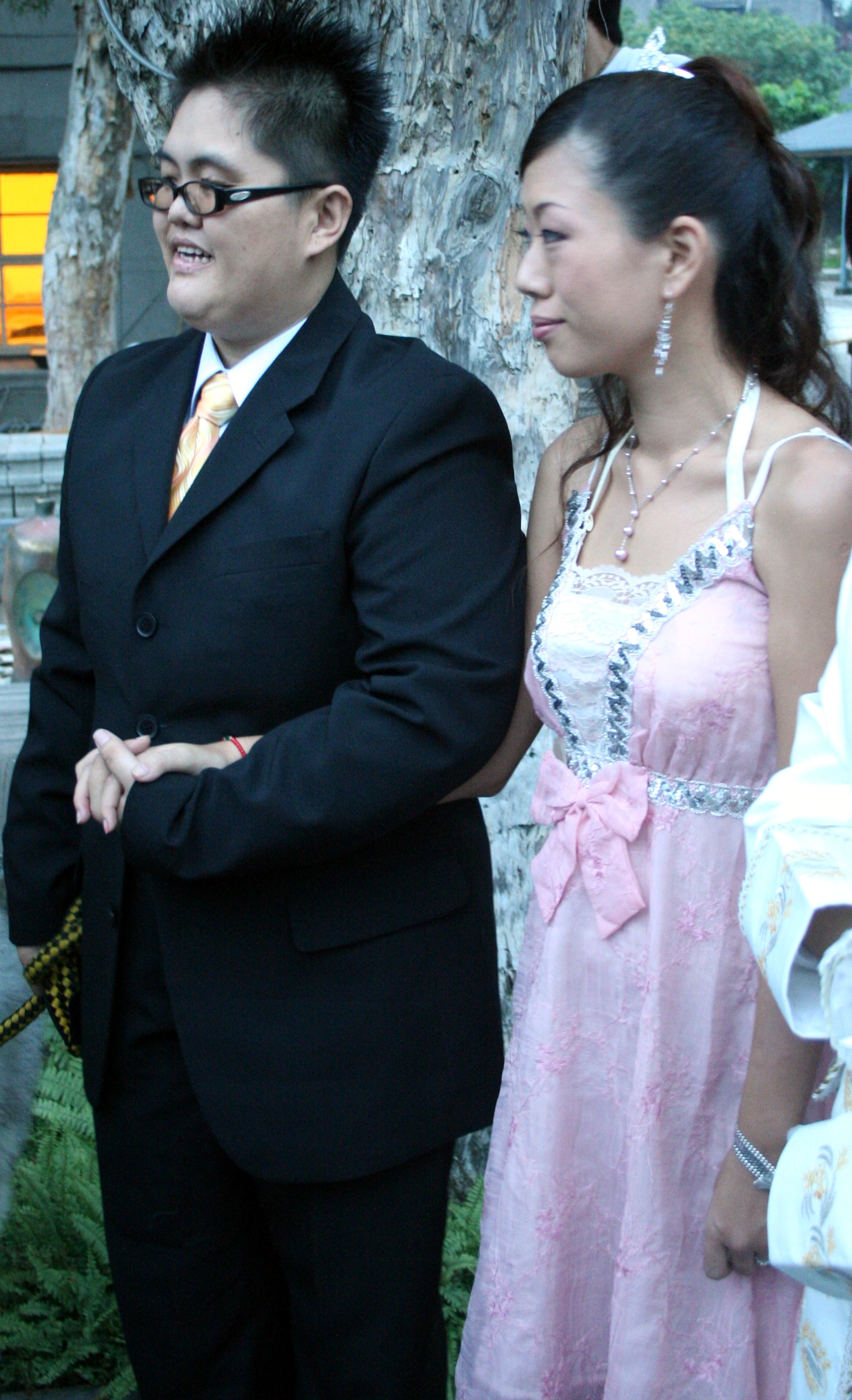
One of four newly wedded couples at a public wedding at Taiwan Pride 2006

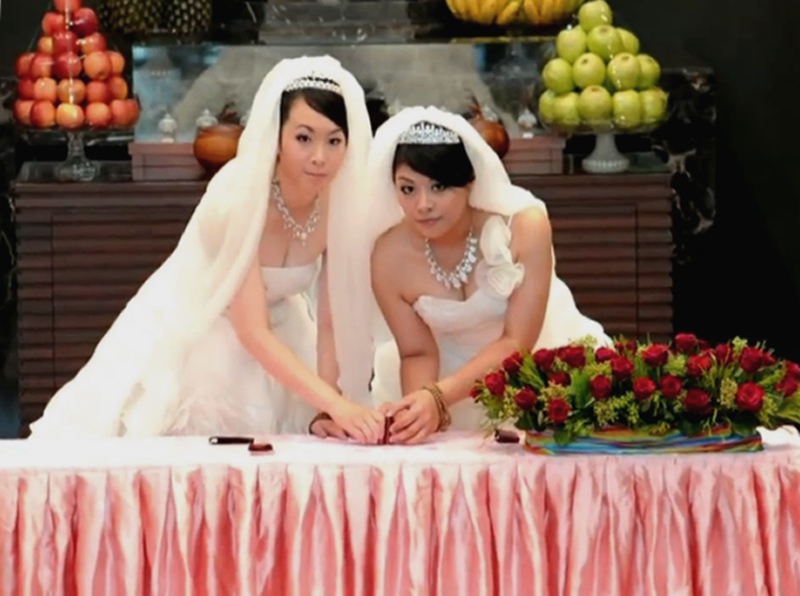
Buddhist same-sex marriage ceremony, 2012

In March 2012, a same-sex couple, Ching-Hsueh Chen and Chih-Wei Kao, applied to the Taipei High Administrative Court to have their relationship recognized as a marriage. The first hearing took place on April 10, 2012. The couple was accompanied by their mothers and received personal blessings from the judges for their love, although the judges said that this would not have any repercussion in their final ruling. The next hearing was set to take place a month later, and the court was due to hand down a decision on December 20. Instead, the court reneged on a ruling, opting to send the case to the Council of Grand Justices in the Judicial Yuan for a constitutional interpretation. The case was then voluntarily withdrawn by the couple due to the hesitancy of the judiciary in taking on the case.

On 25 October 2013, a petition-initiated bill to revise the Civil Code to allow for same-sex marriage was introduced by 23 DPP lawmakers to the Legislative Yuan. It was immediately referred to the Yuan's Judiciary, Organic Laws and Statutes Committee for review and a possible first reading. On 22 December 2014, the proposed amendment to the Civil Code was due to go under review by the committee. If the amendment had passed the committee stage, it would have then been voted on at the plenary session of the Legislative Yuan in 2015. The amendment, called the "marriage equality amendment", would have inserted gender-neutral terms in the Civil Code replacing ones that implied heterosexual couples. It would have also allowed same-sex couples to adopt children. DPP member Yu Mei-nu expressed support for the amendment as did more than 20 other DPP lawmakers as well as two legislators from the Taiwan Solidarity Union and one each from the KMT and the People First Party (PFP). On 28 June 2015, a senior official from the Ministry of Justice stated that same-sex marriage would remain illegal in Taiwan "for now". Deputy Minister of Justice Chen Ming-tang said "...in Taiwan, the issue of legalizing same-sex marriage remains extremely controversial...so we should not consider it for now". He added that while the Ministry of Justice opposed measures that would legalize same-sex marriages outright, it would support a more gradual approach, including offering better protection to same-sex couples under current laws, such as their rights to equal medical treatment and taxation.

In October 2015, same-sex couples were allowed to participate at the Taoyuan City Government's public mass wedding ceremony for the first time. Taipei followed suit one day later. On 28 October 2015, the Taichung City Government announced that same-sex couples would be permitted to participate in the following year's mass wedding ceremony.

=== 2016 new administration and parliament ===
The Taiwanese elections held in January 2016 resulted in a victory for the Democratic Progressive Party. The DPP candidate, Tsai Ing-wen, won the presidential election, and the party won a parliamentary majority in the legislative election. The DPP is socially liberal and a majority of its members support the legalisation of same-sex marriage.

On 23 February 2016, the Referendum Review Committee (行政院公民投票審議委員會) rejected a proposal put forward by the Faith and Hope League on the grounds that it failed to meet requirements. The proposal would have amended the Civil Code by stating that "husband and wife relationships, consanguinity and the principles of human relations cannot be amended unless the public agrees via a referendum". Had it been approved, the legalization of same-sex marriage would have only been possible through a referendum. The committee voted 10–1 against the proposal. Chairman of the committee, Wang Kao-cheng, said it was rejected for two reasons: one, that the proposed was not a law, a legislative principle, important policy or constitutional amendment and therefore did not meet the requirements of the Referendum Act (Chinese: 公民投票法); and two, the proposal was about revising several provisions of the Civil Code, which did not meet the law's requirement that a referendum should be about a single issue.

In July 2016, several Taiwanese legislators announced that they would introduce a same-sex marriage bill to Parliament by the end of 2016. On 16 October 2016, Jacques Picoux, a lecturer at the National Taiwan University, died after falling from the tenth floor of his Taipei apartment block; friends believed he had taken his own life due to lack of same-sex marriage rights. On 25 October 2016, about a dozen legislators submitted a bill to legalize same-sex marriage in Taiwan. The proposed amendment was mostly supported by DPP legislators (whose party had a majority in the Legislative Yuan) though also by one legislator from the minority KMT, which was divided on the issue of same-sex marriage. Yu Mei-nu, who drafted the bill, expressed optimism the law would be introduced as early as the following year and that same-sex marriage would be legal in the country by the end of 2017. In addition, a separate amendment legalizing same-sex marriage was also announced by the third-party New Power Party (NPP) caucus. On 29 October, President Tsai Ing-wen reaffirmed her support for same-sex marriage. On 31 October 2016, the Secretary-General of the Executive Yuan, Chen Mei-ling, stated that the Executive supports same-sex marriage and that Premier Lin Chuan had urged the Ministry of Justice to take action on the issue. Two draft amendments to Taiwan's Civil Code to legalize both same-sex marriage and adoption by same-sex partners passed their first reading in the Legislative Yuan on 8 November 2016. Both bills were immediately referred to the Judiciary, Organic Laws and Statutes Committee for discussion.

The committee discussed the proposals on 17 November 2016 and was sharply divided. KMT and PFP representatives demanded a nationwide series of hearings be held over a number of months on the issue, while DPP legislators wanted the bills to be reviewed and immediately proceeded with. Following a number of physical scuffles between the MPs, the committee eventually agreed to hold two public hearings on the issue over the following two weeks; one hearing chaired by a KMT representative and another hearing chaired by a DPP representative. Several thousand opponents and supporters of same-sex marriage protested outside the Parliament on the streets of Taipei whilst the committee was meeting. In early December 2016, tens of thousands of opponents of same-sex marriage demonstrated in Taipei, Taichung and Kaohsiung. Less than a week later, close to 250,000 supporters of same-sex marriage gathered in front of the Presidential Office Building in Taipei, calling on the Taiwan Government to promptly legalize same-sex marriage.

On 26 December 2016, the Judiciary, Organic Laws and Statutes Committee completed and passed its examination of the same-sex marriage bills. The bills then had to pass second and third reading in the Legislative Yuan before becoming law. In October 2017, Premier Lai Ching-te said that the government "is not giving up its effort to present a proposal before the end of the year to legalize same-sex marriage". Eventually however, the bills stalled and were not voted on.

=== 2017 Constitutional Court ruling ===
Judicial Yuan Interpretation No. 748
- Original title: 司法院釋字第七四八號解釋 (Note: In some of Taiwan's national and local languages: Mandarin: sīfǎyuàn shì zì dì 748 hào jiěshì; Taiwanese: su-hoat-īⁿ sek lī tē 748 hō kái-sek; Hakka: sṳ̂-fap-yen sṳt sṳ thi 748 ho kié-sṳt; Matsu: sṳ̆-huák-iêng sék cê dâ̤ 748 hô̤ gāi-sék)
- Created: March 24, 2017 (argued) – May 24, 2017 (decided)
- Ratified: May 24, 2017
- Location: Taipei, Taiwan
- Commissioned by: Judicial Yuan
- Author: Justices of the Constitutional Court
- Signatories: Majority: Hsu Tzong-li (Chief Justice); Chang Chong-wen; Chen Be-yue; Jan Sheng-lin; Lin Jiun-yi; Lo Chang-fa; Hsu Chih-hsiung; Huang Hsi-chun; Hwang Jau-yuan; Tang Dennis Te-chung; Tsai Jeong-duen; Tsai Ming-cheng; Concurrence/dissents: Huang Horng-shya; Dissents: Wu Chen-huan; Not participating: Huang Jui-ming
- Purpose: Judged the statutory ban on same-sex marriage in Taiwan's Civil Code as unconstitutional.

In March 2017, the full panel of the Constitutional Court (Judicial Yuan) heard a case brought by gay rights activist Chi Chia-wei (whose attempt at registering a marriage with his partner in 2013 was rejected) and the Taipei City Government's Department of Civil Affairs. Taipei City, a special municipality, had originally referred the question of constitutionality to the court for resolution in July 2015. Both requested a constitutional interpretation on the issue and asked the court to focus on whether the Civil Code allowed same-sex marriage and if not, whether this violated articles of the Constitution of the Republic of China pertaining to equality and the freedom to marry.

The court issued its ruling (Judicial Yuan Interpretation No. 748) on 24 May 2017, finding that the statutory ban on same-sex marriage in the Civil Code was "in violation of both the people's freedom of marriage as protected by Article 22 and the people's right to equality as guaranteed by Article 7 of the Constitution." Thus, provisions defining marriage as between one man and one woman are unconstitutional, and the court requested that the Legislative Yuan amend existing laws. A time frame of two years was permitted for this to occur (i.e. by 24 May 2019), after which "two persons of the same-sex ... may apply for marriage registration [and] shall be accorded the status of a legally recognized couple, and then enjoy the rights and bear the obligations arising on couples", according to the official press release that accompanied the verdict.

As a result of the ruling, the Legislative Yuan could simply amend the existing marriage laws to include same-sex couples, thereby granting them the same rights enjoyed by married opposite-sex couples, or it could elect to pass a new law recognizing same-sex marriages or civil partnerships but giving said couples only some of the rights attributed to marriage. In response to the ruling, Cabinet spokesman Hsu Kuo-yung said that the Executive Yuan would draft a proposal for revising the laws, though had not yet decided whether to amend the Civil Code to include same-sex couples in the definition of marriage or create a separate and distinct law specifically addressing same-sex marriages. The Secretary-General to the President, Joseph Wu, expressed his support for the ruling, claiming that it was "binding on all Taiwanese nationals and all levels of government".

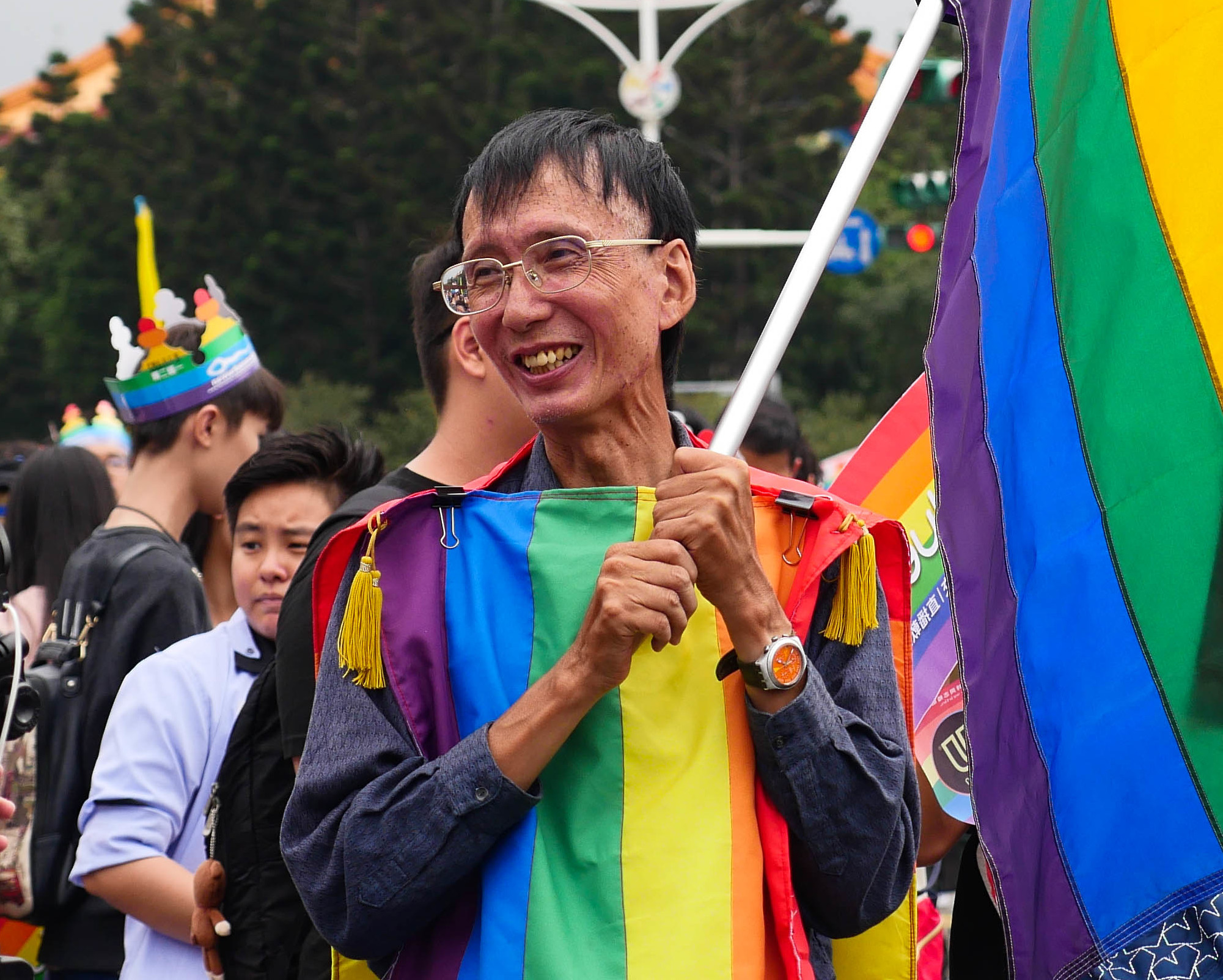
Following the Constitutional Court ruling, longtime LGBT rights activist Chi Chia-wei said that he was "leaping with joy like a bird".

By June 2017, the Executive Yuan had requested that government agencies relax restrictions on same-sex couples, to entitle them to rights accorded to married couples, such as signing medical consent forms, asking for family care leave and visiting imprisoned partners. The Secretary-General of the Executive, Chen Mei-ling, stated that the Cabinet had not yet decided on how to legalize same-sex marriages — by amending the Civil Code, by establishing a special section of the Civil Code or by creating a special law. Government inaction over the following months resulted in implementation of the court's ruling being pushed back. In December 2017, the Taipei Administrative Court ruled that same-sex couples could not marry in Taiwan until legislation was passed by the Legislative Yuan or until 24 May 2019 when the Constitutional Court ruling would go into effect.

In October 2017, 22 members of the Yunlin County Council voted to support a motion to impeach Hsu Tzong-li, the President of the Judicial Yuan, and the other judges who ruled in favor of same-sex marriage. Members who signed the motion claimed that "marriages between same-sex couples will have a huge impact on the society and social order" and that the ruling had caused "disappointment and concern". In January 2018, opponents of same-sex marriage filed an appeal with the Supreme Administrative Court to annul the May 2017 decision. The appeal was quickly rejected by the court. They filed a second appeal in February, which was also unsuccessful.

=== 2018 referendums ===
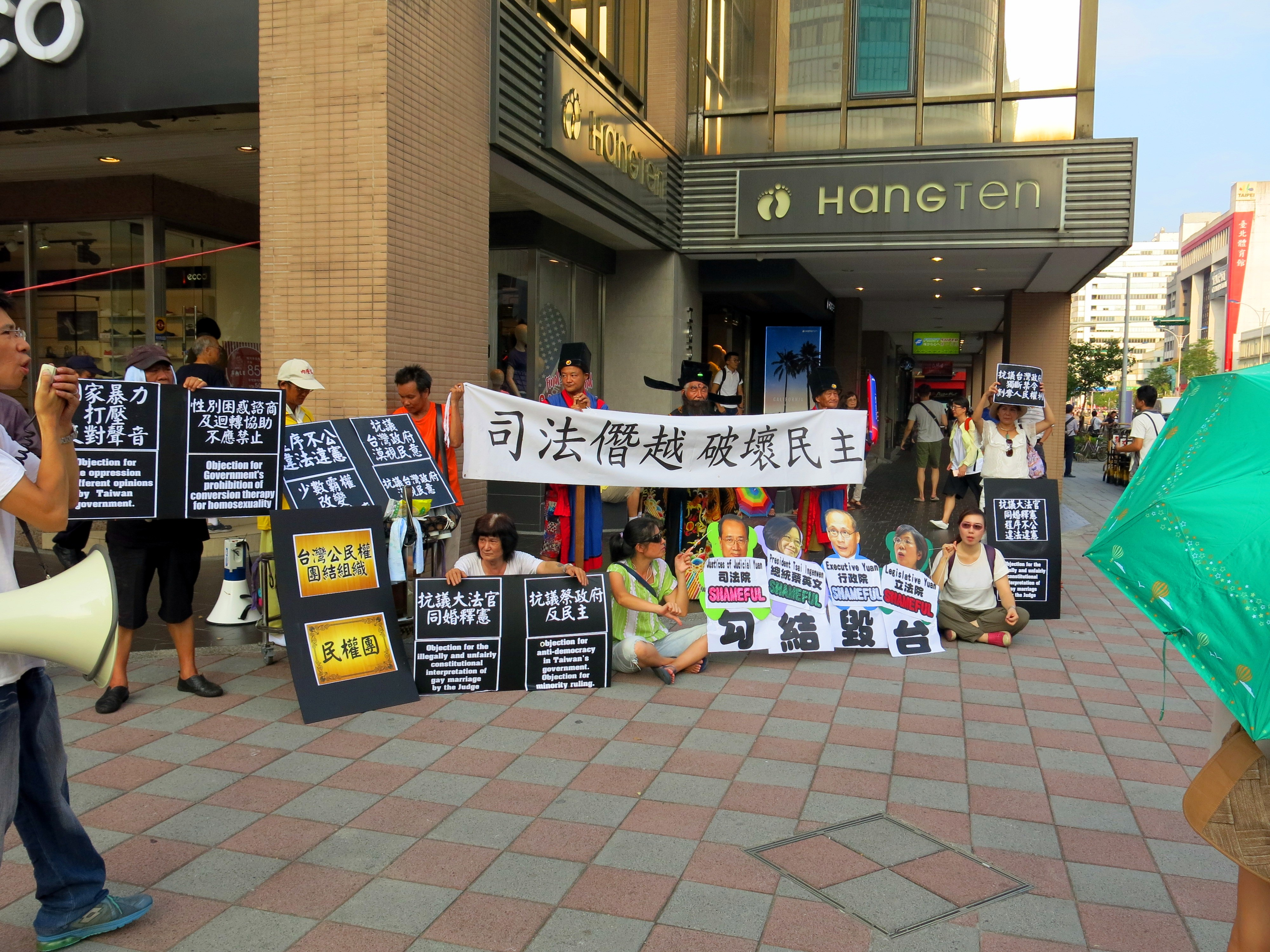
Opponents of same-sex marriage campaigning in Taipei in 2017

In February 2018, a group opposed to same-sex marriage, the Alliance for Next Generation's Happiness, proposed holding a referendum on the issue of same-sex marriage, which required collecting about 280,000 signatures (1.5% of eligible voters) for the initiative to be presented to the voters. Firstly, however, the group had to collect 1,879 valid signatures. This would then enable them to proceed with collecting the 280,000 signatures. By April 2018, the group had collected 3,100 signatures, and the Central Election Commission (CEC) validated the signatures later that month.

The group wanted the three following questions to be presented to Taiwanese voters:

- "Do you agree with using means other than the marriage regulations in the Civil Code to protect the rights of two people of the same gender to build a permanent life together?"
- "Do you agree that the marriage regulations in the Civil Code should define marriage as between a man and a woman?"
- "Do you agree that during the elementary and junior high school stage, the Ministry of Education and schools at all levels should not implement same-sex education as stipulated in the Gender Equity Education Act's implementation rules?"

LGBT activist Chi Chia-wei described the referendum proposal as "clearly a violation of the Constitution".

In late August 2018, the Alliance for Next Generation's Happiness announced it had collected 678,000 signatures, which were then vetted and approved by the CEC. In September, a pro-same-sex marriage group announced it had collected more than 600,000 signatures to submit its own questions to a referendum, which were the following:

- "Do you agree that the Civil Code marriage regulations should be used to guarantee the rights of same sex couples to get married?"
- "Do you agree that gender equity education as defined in 'the Gender Equity Education Act' should be taught at all stages of the national curriculum and that such education should cover courses on emotional education, sex education and gay and lesbian education?"

The referendum proposals were also approved by the CEC, and a public vote was held on 24 November 2018. On 24 November, Taiwanese voters approved the three initiatives launched by the Alliance for Next Generation's Happiness and rejected the two pro-LGBT initiatives, by wide margins. The week before the vote, the government announced that the Constitutional Court ruling would still go into effect in May 2019 regardless of the referendum results. On 25 November 2018, an Executive Yuan spokeswoman, Kolas Yotaka, said that a draft of a special law to regulate same-sex marriages would be submitted to the Legislative Yuan within three months. On 29 November, the Judicial Yuan Secretary-General stated that the referendum results could not override the 2017 court ruling. The following day, Premier Lai Ching-te confirmed that the government would respect the results of the referendum and as such would not amend the Civil Code, but rather prepare a separate law on the matter, and on 5 December, the Minister of Justice, Tsai Ching-hsiang, said that a bill would be introduced before 1 March 2019.

=== Legislative process ===
==== 2019 law ====
Act for Implementation of J.Y. Interpretation No. 748 司法院釋字第七四八號解釋施行法 (Note: In some of Taiwan's national and local languages: Mandarin: sīfǎyuàn shì zì dì 748 hào jiěshì shīxíng fǎ; Taiwanese: su-hoat-īⁿ sek lī tē 748 hō kái-sek si-hêng hoat; Hakka: sṳ̂-fap-yen sṳt sṳ thi 748 ho kié-sṳt sṳ̂-hàng fap; Matsu: sṳ̆-huák-iêng sék cê dâ̤ 748 hô̤ gāi-sék siĕ-hèng huák)

Legislative Yuan
- Passed by: Legislative Yuan
- Passed: May 17, 2019
- Signed by: President Tsai Ing-wen; Premier Su Tseng-chang
- Signed: May 22, 2019
- Effective: May 24, 2019
- Administered by: Ministry of Justice

Legislative history
- Introduced by: Executive Yuan
- First reading: March 5, 2019
- Second reading: May 17, 2019
- Third reading: May 17, 2019
- Status: In force

On 20 February 2019, the Executive Yuan published a draft bill, entitled Act for Implementation of J.Y. Interpretation No. 748, which allows two persons of the same sex to create a "permanent union of intimate and exclusive nature for the purpose of living a common life". It covers topics such as inheritance rights, medical rights, and adoption of the biological children of the partner. The draft bill would also set penalties for adultery and bigamy, similar to opposite-sex marriages. The bill would not amend the existing marriage laws in the Civil Code. The bill was approved by the Executive Yuan on 21 February 2019 and then sent to the Legislative Yuan for passage, before taking effect on 24 May. It was well received by LGBT groups, but denounced by conservative organizations. NPP legislator Freddy Lim presented his own bill to legalize same-sex marriage on 21 February.

The Ministry of Justice stated that the draft bill would be subject to further amendments, including on issues such as transnational marriages and assisted reproduction. Another difference between same-sex and opposite-sex marriages would be the minimum required marriageable age. Currently, women can marry at 16 and men at 18. Under the proposed law, same-sex couples would be able to get married from the age of 18, but would require parental consent if under 20. On 5 March, the bill was moved to a second reading in a 59–24 vote.

On 14 March, the Legislative Yuan voted to send a draft bill that would limit the use of the words "marriage" and "spouse" to heterosexual couples to a second reading, where the bill would be reviewed together with same-sex marriage bill. The bill, entitled The Enforcement Act of Referendum No. 12, was proposed by KMT legislator Lai Shyh-bao. The bill was drafted by anti-LGBT campaigners and offered very limited rights. It would have allowed two adults of the same sex to register as one family, but limited how much one partner could inherit from another. The NPP attempted to block the bill, but failed to secure enough votes. Families and rights groups in Taiwan protested outside the Legislative Yuan and urged Lai to withdraw the "homophobic" draft bill.

===== Approval by the Legislative Yuan =====
On May 17, 2019, the DPP-controlled Legislative Yuan approved the same-sex marriage bill in its third and final reading. Over 40,000 people attended a rally organized by LGBT human rights organizations in front of the Legislative Yuan building to celebrate the bill's passage. The KMT caucus opposed the bill but allowed a free vote; subsequently, seven KMT legislators broke with their caucus to vote in favor. Articles 1-4 of the bill, submitted by the Executive Yuan and approved by the Legislative Yuan, allow same-sex couples to form an "exclusive permanent union" (article 2) and apply for a "marriage registration" (article 4) with government agencies, and refers to the Judicial Yuan ruling to enforce its definition of marriage (article 1). Other articles in the bill also specify that a married same-sex partner can adopt the biological child of their spouse. All 27 articles of the bill were approved, mostly by the DPP and NPP caucuses. The bill was signed into law by President Tsai Ing-wen on 22 May, and took effect on 24 May 2019. Two other bills which were submitted by conservative lawmakers (from both the KMT and the DPP) seeking to refer to the partnerships as "same-sex family relationships" or "same-sex unions" rather than same-sex marriage were not put to a vote.

May 17, 2019 vote for article 4 in the Legislative Yuan
Party	Votes for	Votes against	Absent (Did not vote)
Democratic Progressive Party (DPP)	54	1	13
Kuomintang (KMT)	7	23	4
New Power Party (NPP)	5	-	-
People First Party (PFP)	-	3	-
Non-Partisan Solidarity Union (NPSU)	-	-	1
Independents	-	-	2
Total	66	27	20

==== Subsequent legislation ====
According to the Act Governing the Choice of Law in Civil Matters Involving Foreign Elements (Chinese: 涉外民事法律適用法), Taiwanese citizens could only marry foreign same-sex spouses who were citizens of countries or territories where same-sex marriage is legal. On 4 March 2021, the Taipei High Administrative Court ruled that these restrictions contravened the May 2017 Constitutional Court ruling. The government subsequently announced its intention to draft a bill to allow same-sex marriages between Taiwanese nationals and foreign citizens regardless of whether the spouse's homeland recognizes the union. While the changes would also cover Hong Kong and Macau, they would not apply to Chinese citizens because cross-strait marriages must be registered in mainland China before they can be recognized in Taiwan. A bill was passed by the Legislative Yuan and entered into force on 19 January 2023. Another limitation was that the law initially only allowed for same-sex couples to adopt their stepchildren. In May 2023, a law permitting joint adoption was formally approved by the Legislative Yuan. However, lesbian couples still lack the ability to access in vitro fertilisation. On September 20, 2024, the Ministry of the Interior and the Mainland Affairs Council announced that mainland Chinese nationals in same-sex relationships with Taiwanese nationals would be recognized as married under Taiwanese law if their marriage is registered in a country which legalized same-sex marriage. Cross-strait same-sex couples who have been legally married abroad must present formal documentation of their marriage and must be interviewed by Taiwanese agencies prior to certification in Taiwan.

Marriage certificates are issued by the Department of Household Registration Affairs. The spouse's name will appear on the person's national identification card (if the person is a Taiwanese national) or the resident certificate (if a permanent resident). Marriage certificates for same-sex couples share the same format as for opposite-sex couples.

== Statistics ==
=== Partnerships ===
By April 2016, more than 500 same-sex couples had registered their partnerships in the country, mostly in Taipei.

According to statistics published by the Ministry of the Interior, 272 same-sex partnerships were registered at the end of 2015, followed by 1,689 at the end of 2016, 2,142 on 31 May 2017, 2,890 at the end of 2017, 3,951 in November 2018, and 3,989 in late April 2019. In May 2020, there were 2,587 active same-sex partnership registrations, with many couples having converted their partnership into marriage.

=== Marriage ===
Number of marriages and divorces in Taiwan
Year	Same-sex marriages			Total marriages	Same-sex divorces			Total divorces
Year	Female	Male	Total	Total marriages	Female	Male	Total	Total divorces
2018	—N/a			135,322	—N/a			54,402
2019 (Note: Since 24 May)	2,013	931	2,944	133,741	60	50	110	54,346
2020	1,712	672	2,384	120,397	272	100	372	51,610
2021	1,323	536	1,859	114,396	381	126	507	47,888
2022	1,794	699	2,493	127,533	455	158	613	50,803

526 same-sex couples got married on 24 May 2019, the first day they were legally permitted to do so. 185 were male couples and 341 were lesbian couples. New Taipei City registered the most marriages, with 117, following by Taipei with 95 and Kaohsiung with 72.

By 23 June 2019, 1,173 same-sex couples had married in Taiwan: 383 male couples and 790 female couples. Two divorces took place. New Taipei City registered 242 same-sex marriages, followed by Taipei (198), Kaohsiung (159), Taichung (141), Taoyuan (123), Tainan (89), Hsinchu County (28), Hualien County (27), Pingtung County (27), Hsinchu (25), Yilan County (20), Changhua County (19), Miaoli County (19), Keelung (15), Nantou County (13), Yunlin County (12), Chiayi County (9), Taitung County (6), Chiayi (3), Penghu County (3), Kinmen County (2) and none in Lienchiang County. The first same-sex marriage in Lienchiang took place in Nangan in March 2020.

By 23 May 2020, almost one year after legalization, 4,021 couples had wed in Taiwan. The data released by the Ministry of the Interior showed that the majority of the marriages were between female couples, at 2,773 (69%), while 1,248 were between male couples. While the majority of same-sex marriages were between Taiwanese nationals, the number of transnational couples, in which one spouse was a foreign national, was 189, or 5 percent of the total. Among these transnational marriages, 80 spouses were from the United States, followed by Canada at 21 and Australia at 17.

On October 30, 2020, at the Ministry of National Defense's annual mass wedding ceremony, 2 same-sex couples were among the 188 couples who participated. Both were military officers marrying their civilian partner.

== Indigenous Taiwanese ==
There are no records of same-sex marriage as understood from a Western perspective being performed in Indigenous Taiwanese cultures. However, there is evidence for identities and behaviours that may be placed on the LGBT spectrum. The Paiwan people historically recognized a term called adju (Paiwan pronunciation: [ˈaɟu]) that was "used by female friends to address each other". Today, adju has become synonymous with gender diversity among the Paiwan people. A majority of Indigenous Taiwanese are Christian, having largely converted to Christianity in the 1940s and 1950s, with religion being "tremendously influential in indigenous villages, and intimately connects the interpersonal relationships in villages through fellowship and youth associations". Christian denominations, including the Presbyterian Church in Taiwan, have been influential in indigenous communities in campaigning against same-sex marriage and the existence of the adju.

== Public opinion ==
A poll of 6,439 Taiwanese adults released in April 2006 by the National Union of Taiwan Women's Association/Constitutional Reform Alliance found that 75% believed same-sex relationships were "acceptable", while 25% thought they were "unacceptable".

A poll released in August 2013 showed that 53% of Taiwanese people supported same-sex marriage, with 37% opposed. Among people aged between 20 and 29, support was at 78%. An important source of opposition was in the Taiwanese Christian community; only 25% of Christians supported same-sex marriage. Some Taiwanese Christian pastors have expressed support for the LGBT community, however. A November 2013 poll of 1,377 adults commissioned by cable news channel TVBS indicated that 45% of Taiwanese people opposed same-sex unions, while 40% were in favor. An opinion poll released in December 2014 showed that 54 percent of Taiwanese people supported the legalization of same-sex marriage, while 44.6 percent were opposed.

When conservative religious groups opposed to same-sex marriage launched a petition for public support of their position, a staff editorial from the English-language China Post questioned the logic of the opponents' arguments and endorsed the legalization of same-sex marriage as "a huge step forward in the fight for universal equality akin to ending apartheid". The Taipei Times also questioned the logic and arguments of the opposition.

An online opinion poll carried out by the Ministry of Justice between August and October 2015 indicated that 71% of the Taiwanese population supported same-sex marriage. An opinion poll conducted in November 2016 by the Kuomintang party found that 52% of the Taiwanese population supported same-sex marriage, while 43% were opposed. Another poll commissioned that same month found similar numbers: 55% in support, and 45% in opposition. Support was highest among 20–29-year-olds (80%), but decreased significantly with age. A survey conducted face-to-face between January and May 2020 by Taiwan's Election and Democratization Survey found that 43% of respondents supported same-sex marriage, while 57% were opposed.

According to a survey conducted in April and May 2020, 92.8% of Taiwanese thought that the legalization of same-sex marriage had had no personal impact on them, while 3.7% cited a negative impact, 1.8% a positive impact and 1.7% had no opinion on the matter. In terms of the impact on Taiwanese society, 50.1% said there had been no impact. In addition, 56.8% of respondents stated that they supported adoption by same-sex couples, while 38.4% were opposed. The survey was conducted by telephone interviews among Taiwanese people aged 18 and above and had 1,086 valid responses. A survey by the Department of Gender Equity of the Executive Yuan conducted in May 2021 showed that 60.4% of Taiwanese people supported same-sex marriage, 67.2% supported same-sex couples having the right to adopt children, and 72.2% believed that same-sex couples could be as good parents as straight couples. The poll was conducted by telephone interviews among Taiwanese people aged 20 and above and had 1,080 valid responses.

A Pew Research Center poll conducted between June and September 2023 showed that 45% of Taiwanese people supported same-sex marriage, 43% were opposed and 12% did not know or had refused to answer. When divided by age, support was significantly higher among 18–34-year-olds at 75% and lower among those aged 35 and above at 33%. Women (51%) were also more likely to support same-sex marriage than men (39%). Support was highest among the religiously unaffiliated at 55%, and lowest among Christians at 39% and Buddhists at 38%. A survey published by the Gender Equality Committee of the Executive Yuan in May 2024 showed that 69% of respondents supported same-sex marriage, and 77% supported joint adoption rights for same-sex spouses.

According to government polling released in 2019, only 37% of Taiwanese people reported that they believed same-sex couples should be able to marry. However, by May 2023, the same agency reported that support for marriage had increased to about 60%.

According to a 2026 poll carried out by the "Taiwan Equality Campaign", 54% of Taiwanese people supported same-sex marriage, and 46% were opposed.

== See also ==
- LGBT rights in Taiwan
- Recognition of same-sex unions in Asia
