= Su Ching-chuan =

Taiwanese physician and politician (born 1957)

Su Ching-chuan MLY
- 蘇清泉
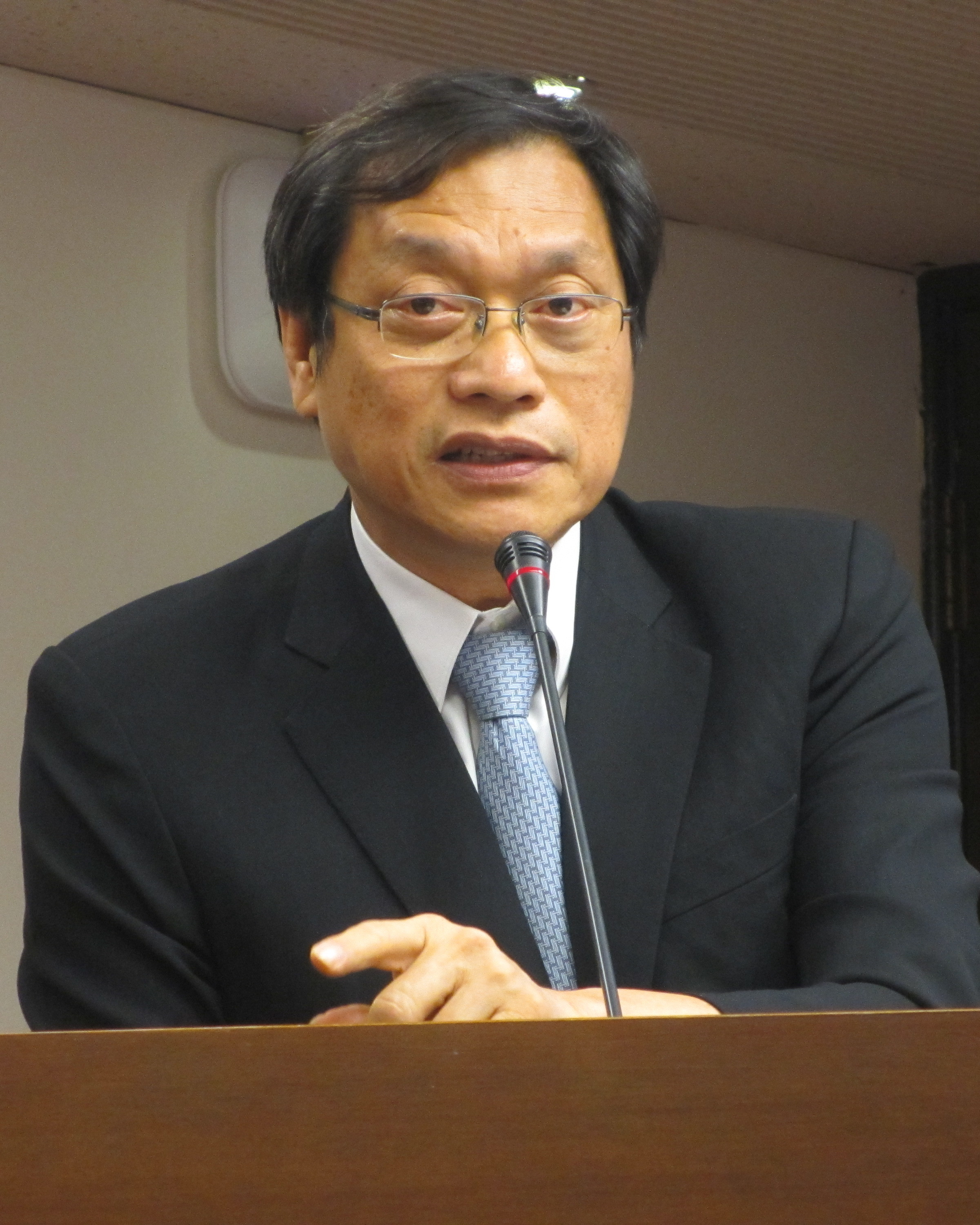
- Su in 2015

Member of the Legislative Yuan
- Incumbent
- Assumed office 1 February 2024
- Constituency: Republic of China
- In office 1 February 2012 – 31 January 2016
- Constituency: Republic of China

Personal details
- Born: 5 August 1957 (age 69) Donggang, Pingtung, Taiwan
- Party: Kuomintang
- Education: Chung Shan Medical University (MB, MS, PhD)
- Profession: Physician
- Scientific career
- Fields: Medical science
- Thesis: A study of the KCNQ4 gene in patients with non-syndromic deafness in Taiwan (2007)

Su Ching-chuan (Chinese: 蘇清泉; born 5 August 1957) is a Taiwanese physician-scientist, cardiac surgeon, and politician. A member of the Kuomintang (KMT), he has served as a member of the Legislative Yuan since 2024 and also served from 2012 to 2016.

== Early life and education ==
Su was born in Donggang, Pingtung, on August 5, 1957. His father, Su Tien-sheng (蘇天生), was a farmer who was the chairman of a local farmer trade union.

After high school, Su attended medical school at Chung Shan Medical University, where he earned his Bachelor of Medicine (M.B.), Master of Science (M.S.), and, in 2007, his Ph.D. in medical science. His doctoral dissertation was titled, "A study of the KCNQ4 gene in patients with non-syndromic deafness in Taiwan" (Chinese: KCNQ4基因在台灣地區非症候群聽障之研究).

== Medical career ==
After graduating from medical school, Su became superintendent of Antai Tian-sheng Memorial Hospital in Donggang, Pingtung. His term as a member of the Eighth Legislative Yuan overlapped with leadership as director-general of the Taiwan Regional Hospital Association, and Taiwan Medical Association. In 2014, when Su and fellow legislator Liao Kuo-tung accused National Taiwan University Hospital and physician Ko Wen-je of unethical organ harvesting practices, a petition calling for Su's resignation from the Taiwan Medical Association was distributed. William Lai and Yeh Ching-chuan also commented on the allegations levied by Su and Liao. Though the petition was delivered to the Taiwan Medical Association, Su remained an organization executive. He was later named honorary superintendent of Antai Tian-sheng Memorial Hospital.

After an October 2024 fire at the Antai Tian-sheng Memorial Hospital killed nine people, Su was questioned by the Pingtung District Prosecutors' Office and released on bail in February 2025.

== Political career ==
Su contested the 2008 legislative election as a Kuomintang candidate from Pingtung County's third district, losing to Pan Men-an.

He placed tenth on the Kuomintang party list in the 2012 legislative election, and was elected to the Legislative Yuan via proportional representation. As a legislator, Su was active in discussions regarding medical topics. He supported efforts for Taiwan's full membership in the World Health Organization, as well as a wider range of participation in other international organizations. Su commented on the subject of Chen Shui-bian's mental health while Chen was imprisoned, opining that the cell Chen was held in was too small. His medical training was considered a good fit for the Social Welfare and Environmental Hygiene Committee, and he had been named the committee convenor by May 2013. In 2014, Su criticized a number of organizations backing medical reform, stating that activists should attempt to establish hospitals that fulfill idealized working conditions and salaries to prove that such medical institutions would be sustainable. In January 2015, an amendment to the Fisheries Act proposed by Su passed, waiving a requirement that Taiwanese maritime employers pay health insurance premiums for foreign employees dating back to 2009.

In 2013, Su backed an amendment to an environmental impact assessment, permitting the proposed projects to continue in water catchment areas near reservoirs. In 2014, he voted against an amendment to the Water Pollution Control Act that would have raised fines for violations of the act.

During the 2014 Taiwan food scandal, Su raised questions about the import of waste cooking oil, and opined that such oils were safe to use. During a 2015 review of Japanese food products produced near the Fukushima Daiichi Nuclear Power Plant, the site of the Fukushima nuclear disaster in 2011, Su called for a boycott of all Japanese foodstuffs.

In 2012, Su visited the Philippines as part of a delegation with fellow lawmakers Hsu Shao-ping and Liao Cheng-ching. Following the Guang Da Xing No. 28 incident in 2013, he proposed that the Taiwanese government utilize air and naval forces to protect Taiwanese fishing boats during the bluefin tuna season, from March to June. He described the Philippines as "a gangster" and "a savage country." When the Sheng Fong No. 12, a Taiwanese vessel, was flagged for inspection by the Philippine Coast Guard in 2015, Su stated that the Taiwanese government should demand the immediate and unconditional release of the boat and its crew.

Though it was reported in March 2015 that Su was considering running for reelection to the Legislative Yuan from his native Pingtung County, by August, his willingness to contest a geographical constituency in Southern Taiwan had been reduced. Su's placement on the party list was still considered likely weeks before the list was due to be finalized.

He contested the Pingtung County magistracy in 2018, losing to incumbent Pan Men-an. Su ran for the same office in 2022. He garnered 206,460 votes (46.59%) to Democratic Progressive Party candidate Chou Chun-mi's 217,537 votes (49.09) with New Power Party candidate Chan Chih-chun finishing third at 19,156 votes (4.32%). After the preliminary results were announced, Su claimed that there were several errors in the vote counting process and petitioned for a recount. The Pingtung District Court dismissed Su's request on 8 December 2022. Su returned to the Legislative Yuan in 2024, via the Kuomintang party list, and again served as a convenor of the Social Welfare and Environmental Hygiene Committee.

Su has served vice chair of the Kuomintang Policy Committee.

== Personal life ==
Su's wife, Su Chu-rong, is a dentist and former periodontal disease lecturer at Loma Linda University. The Control Yuan reported in 2014 that Su owned 74 plots of land and 12 buildings, held NT$38.2 million in savings, NT$2.9 million in stocks, and investments in funds and other legal entities totaling NT$8.7 billion.
