= Lo Chang-fa =

Taiwanese diplomat and judge (born 1956)

- 羅昌發
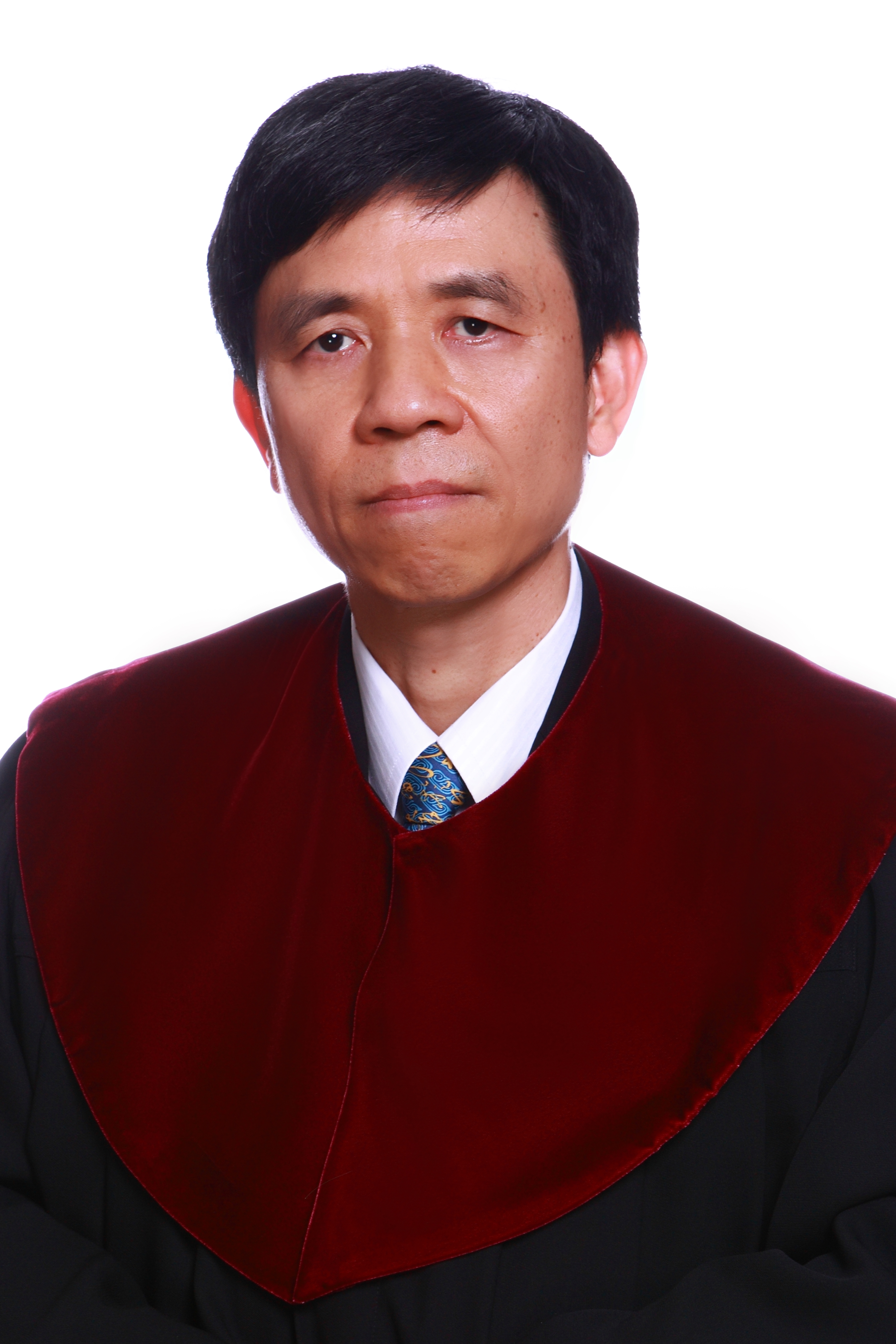
- Official portrait, 2011

Permanent Representative of Taiwan to the World Trade Organization
- In office 2020–2025
- Preceded by: Cyrus Chu
- Succeeded by: Hwang Jau-yuan

Justice of the Judicial Yuan
- In office October 2011 – September 2019

Personal details
- Born: 1956 (age 69–70)
- Education: Fu Jen Catholic University (LLB); National Taiwan University (LLM); Harvard University (LLM, SJD)

Lo Chang-fa (Chinese: 羅昌發; pinyin: Luó Chāngfā; born 1956) is a Taiwanese diplomat and jurist.

== Education ==
Lo graduated from Fu Jen Catholic University with a Bachelor of Laws (LL.B.) in 1978 and obtained a master's degree in law from National Taiwan University in 1980. He then completed doctoral studies in the United States at Harvard University, where he earned a Master of Laws (LL.M.) in 1987 and his Doctor of Juridical Science (S.J.D.) from Harvard Law School in 1989. He wrote his doctoral dissertation at Harvard under Professor William P. Alford. His doctoral dissertation was titled, "The reciprocity principle in the international regulation of economic relations".

== Career ==
Lo returned to Taiwan and practiced law in Taipei before he joined the faculty of the NTU College of Law, where he was appointed chair and distinguished professor. During his tenure as dean of the college of law, he founded two academic journals, the Asian Journal of WTO and International Health Law and Policy in 2006 and the Contemporary Asia Arbitration Journal in 2008. In 2008, Lo was appointed to the Permanent Group of Experts at the World Trade Organization's Committee on Subsidies and Countervailing Measures. Lo was nominated to serve as a Justice of the Constitutional Court in 2011. During his nomination, media reported that Lo held Canadian permanent residency. Both Lo and fellow nominee Chen Be-yue, a former American citizen and permanent resident, told the Legislative Yuan that they would not pursue permanent residency or dual citizenship. After legislative confirmation, Lo took office on 1 October 2011. Lo completed his eight-year term as justice on 30 September 2019. In July 2020, Lo was nominated to serve as Taiwan's representative to the World Trade Organization, to fill a position that had been vacant since Cyrus Chu's resignation in September 2019.
