= Linbian railway station =

Railway station located in Pingtung, Taiwan

Linbian Station 林邊車站
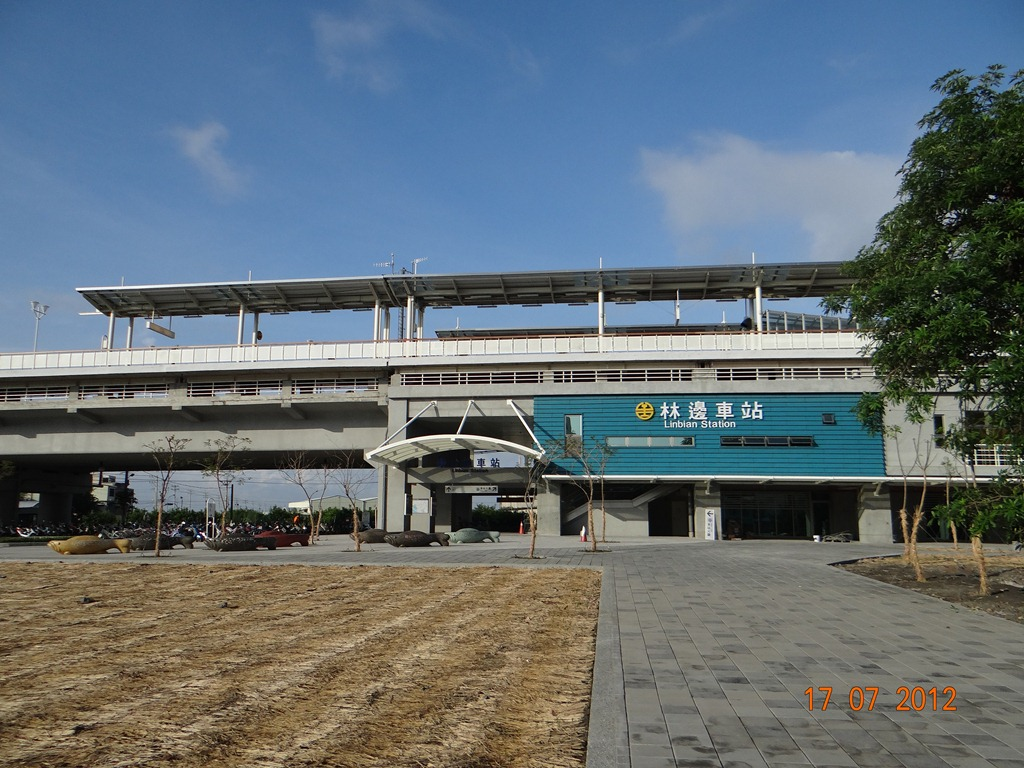

Chinese name
- Traditional Chinese: 林邊車站
Transcriptions
Standard Mandarin
- Hanyu Pinyin: Línbiān Chēzhàn
- Bopomofo: ㄌㄧㄣˊ ㄅㄧㄢ ㄔㄜ ㄓㄢˋ

General information
- Location: Linbian, Pingtung; Taiwan
- Coordinates: 22°25′52.7″N 120°30′55.0″E
- System: Taiwan Railway railway station
- Line: Pingtung line
- Distance: 50.1 km to Kaohsiung
- Platforms: 1 island platform 1 side platform

Construction
- Structure type: Elevated

Other information
- Station code: 199

History
- Opened: 17 January 1940

Passengers
- 2017: 148,629 per year
- Rank: 139

Services
| Preceding station | Taiwan Railway | Following station |
|---|---|---|
| Zhen'an towards Kaohsiung | Western Trunk line (Pingtung) | Jiadong towards Fangliao |
Location
- Location within Taiwan

Linbian railway station (Chinese: 林邊車站; pinyin: Línbiān Chēzhàn) is a railway station located in Linbian Township, Pingtung County, Taiwan. It is located on the Pingtung line and is operated by Taiwan Railway.
