= List of county magistrates of Pingtung =

This is a list of magistrates of Pingtung County. The incumbent Magistrate is Chou Chun-mi of the Democratic Progressive Party since 25 December 2022.

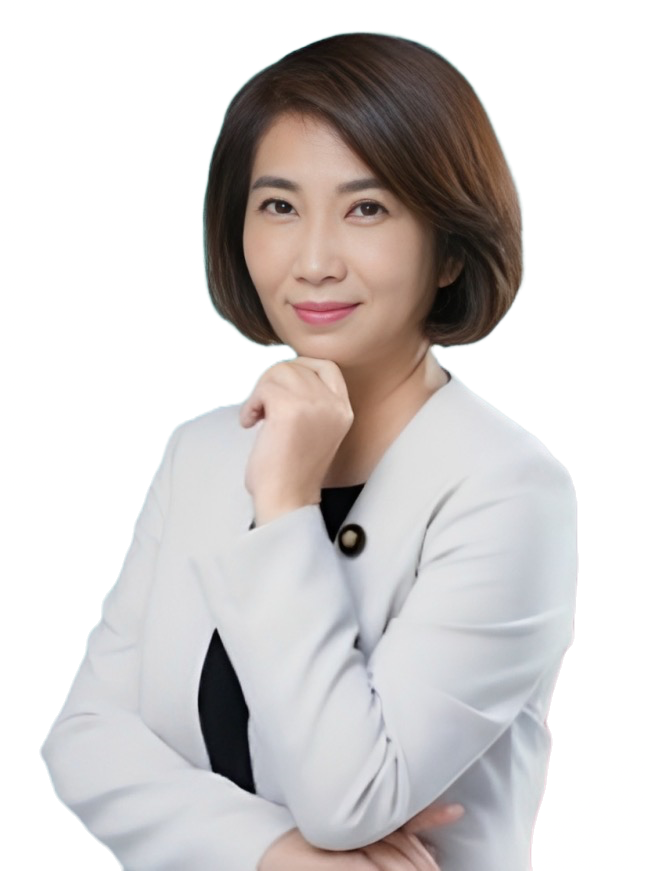
Incumbent Magistrate, Chou Chun-mi

== Directly elected county magistrates ==
Kuomintang Independent Democratic Progressive Party

№	Portrait	Name (Birth–Death)	Term of Office		Term	Political Party
1		Chang Shan-chung 張山鐘; Zhāng Shānzhōng (1887–1965)	1 June 1951	2 June 1954	1	Kuomintang
2		Lin Shih-cheng 林石城; Lín Shíchéng (1912–1995)	2 June 1954	2 June 1957	2	Kuomintang
2		Lin Shih-cheng 林石城; Lín Shíchéng (1912–1995)	2 June 1957	2 June 1960	3	Kuomintang
3		Lee Shih-chang 李世昌; Lǐ Shìchāng (1920–1986)	2 June 1960	2 June 1964	4	Kuomintang
4		Chang Feng-hsu 張豐緒; Zhāng Fēngxù (1928–2014)	2 June 1964	2 June 1968	5	Kuomintang
4		Chang Feng-hsu 張豐緒; Zhāng Fēngxù (1928–2014)	2 June 1968	1 February 1973	6	Kuomintang
5		Ko Wen-fu 柯文福; Kē Wénfú (1934–2010)	1 February 1973	20 December 1977	7	Kuomintang
5		Ko Wen-fu 柯文福; Kē Wénfú (1934–2010)	20 December 1977	20 December 1981	8	Kuomintang
6		Chiou Lien-hui 邱連輝; Qiū Liánhuī (1932–2010)	20 December 1981	20 December 1985	9	Independent
7		Shih Meng-hsiung 施孟雄; Shī Mèngxióng (1944–1993)	20 December 1985	20 December 1989	10	Kuomintang
8		Su Tseng-chang 蘇貞昌; Sū Zhēnchāng (1947–)	20 December 1989	20 December 1993	11	Democratic Progressive Party
9		Wu Tse-yuan 伍澤元; Wǔ Zéyuán (1945–2008)	20 December 1993	14 October 1997	12	Kuomintang
–		Chang Man-chuan 張滿泉; Zhāng Mǎnquán	15 October 1997	20 December 1997	12	Kuomintang
10		Su Jia-chyuan 蘇嘉全; Sū Jiāquán (1956–)	20 December 1997	20 December 2001	13	Democratic Progressive Party
10		Su Jia-chyuan 蘇嘉全; Sū Jiāquán (1956–)	20 December 2001	8 April 2004	14	Democratic Progressive Party
–		Wu Ying-wen 吳應文; Wú Yìngwén	9 April 2004	20 December 2005	14	Democratic Progressive Party
11		Tsao Chi-hung 曹啟鴻; Cáo Qǐhóng (1948-)	20 December 2005	20 December 2009	15	Democratic Progressive Party
11		Tsao Chi-hung 曹啟鴻; Cáo Qǐhóng (1948-)	20 December 2009	25 December 2014	16	Democratic Progressive Party
12		Pan Men-an 潘孟安; Pān Mèng'ān (1963-)	25 December 2014	25 December 2018	17	Democratic Progressive Party
12		Pan Men-an 潘孟安; Pān Mèng'ān (1963-)	25 December 2018	25 December 2022	18	Democratic Progressive Party
13		Chou Chun-mi 周春米; Zhōu Chūnmǐ (1966-)	25 December 2022	Incumbent	19	Democratic Progressive Party

== See also ==
- Pingtung County
