= Linbian River =

Coordinates: 22.420673°N 120.517631°E

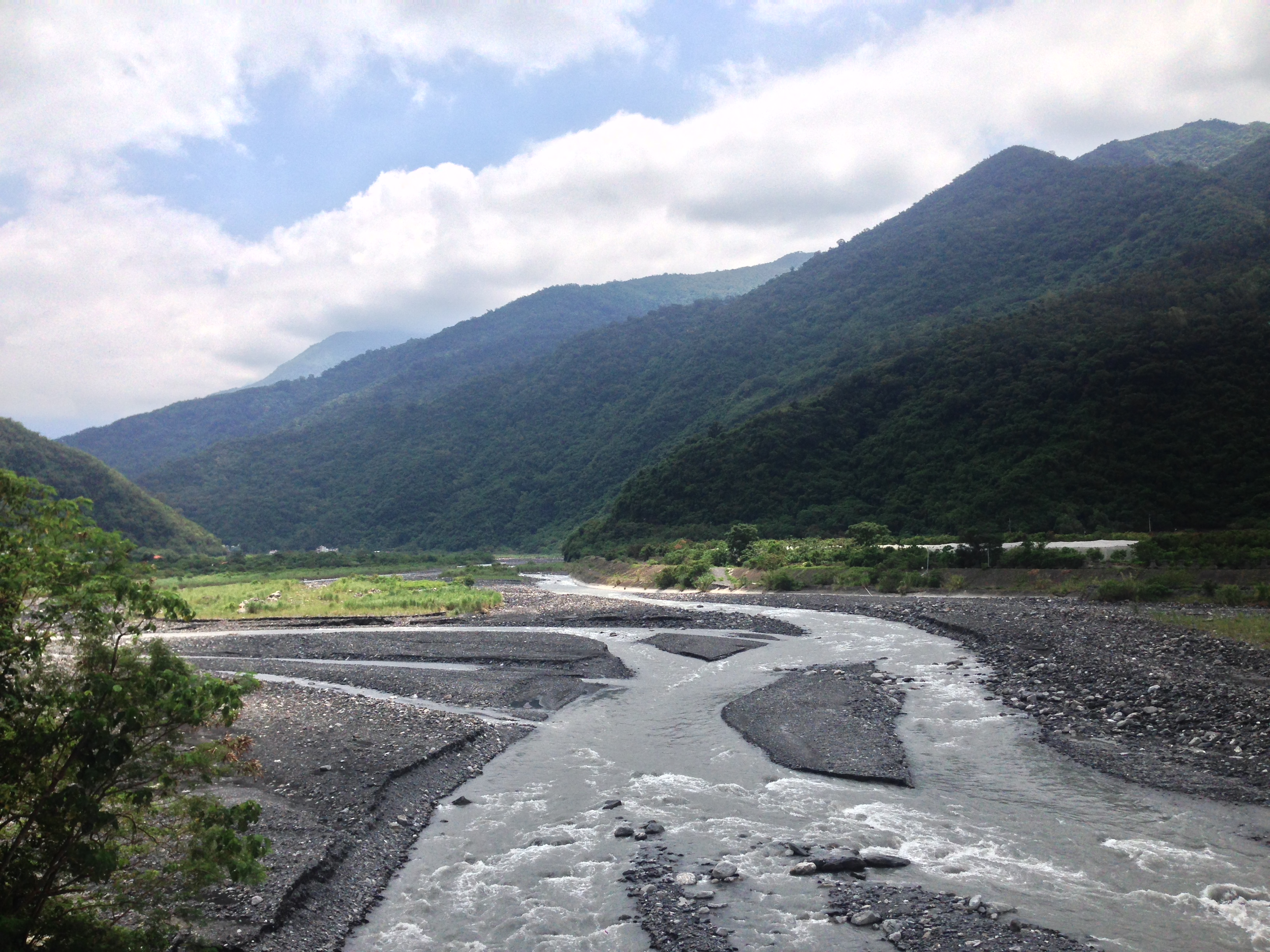
- Native name: 林邊溪 (Chinese)

Location
- Location: Pingtung County, Taiwan

Physical characteristics
- Length: 42 km (26 mi)

The Linbian River (Chinese: 林邊溪; pinyin: Línbiān Xī; Wade–Giles: Lin^{2}-pian^{1} Hsi^{1}) is a river in Taiwan. It flows through Pingtung County for 42 km.

== Transportation ==
The river is accessible within walking distance South East from Linbian Station of Taiwan Railway.

== See also ==
- List of rivers in Taiwan
