= Chen Zhenyuan fake peer review scandal =

2014 academic misconduct case

The Chen Zhenyuan fake peer review scandal was an academic misconduct case that came to light in July 2014. The UK-based publisher SAGE Publications discovered that Chen Zhenyuan, then an associate professor in the Department of Computer Science at National Pingtung University of Education (now National Pingtung University, Minsheng Campus), was suspected of fabricating 130 fake reviewer accounts in order to manipulate peer review and citation networks to secure the publication of his papers. As a result, SAGE retracted 60 papers authored or co-authored by Chen Zhenyuan from the Journal of Vibration and Control (JVC).

The mass retraction of 60 papers at once was extremely rare in the global academic community. The editor-in-chief of the Journal of Vibration and Control subsequently resigned and applied for retirement from his university. Among the retracted papers, five were authored by Taiwan’s then Minister of Education, Chiang Wei-ling, with Chen Zhenyuan listed as a co-author. Amid intense public pressure, Chiang Wei-ling resigned as Minister of Education.

== Background and timeline ==
=== 2009 ===
Chen Zhenyuan joined National Pingtung University of Education as a faculty member and began publishing a large number of papers in the Journal of Vibration and Control (JVC).

=== February 2011 ===
Chen Zhenyuan was promoted to associate professor.

=== 2013 ===
Ali H. Nayfeh, editor-in-chief of JVC, reviewed Chen’s papers and discovered suspicious reviewer accounts. Upon investigation, 130 problematic accounts were identified, all suspected to have been fabricated by Chen Zhenyuan.

In September, SAGE Publications sent a formal letter to National Pingtung University of Education requesting assistance in the investigation.

In October, the Department of Computer Science at the university established a special investigative committee.

In November, Chen Zhenyuan resigned from his associate professor position and officially left the university after the start of the semester in February 2014.

The university concluded its internal investigation without publicly releasing the results or notifying the Ministry of Education. The university stated that Chen’s resignation had hindered the investigation, and that many investigative actions could not be carried out during the summer break. It emphasized that a final report would be completed after the new semester began and that the matter would “not be privately settled.”

== Public exposure and aftermath ==
=== May 2014 ===
After completing his investigation and submitting a report to JVC, editor-in-chief Ali H. Nayfeh resigned from his position and applied for retirement from his university, taking responsibility for the incident.

=== July 8, 2014 ===
The blog Retraction Watch first disclosed the incident to the public.

=== July 9, 2014 ===
The Journal of Vibration and Control issued a statement accusing Chen Zhenyuan of exploiting the journal’s online peer review system by registering 130 fake reviewer accounts. SAGE Publications suspected that Chen used this method to pass peer review and consequently retracted 60 papers associated with him.

Major international media outlets, including The New York Times and The Washington Post, reported on the case. Taiwanese media followed shortly thereafter.

Academic Lee Chia-tung criticized the incident as being caused by flaws in JVC's peer review system.

=== July 11, 2014 ===
Because five of the retracted papers were authored by Chiang Wei-ling, with Chen Zhenyuan listed as a co-author, Chiang held a press conference to clarify the matter. Chiang stated that Chen Zhenyuan’s younger brother, Chen Zhenwu, was his supervised student, and that Chen Zhenyuan’s co-authorship was handled by Chen Zhenwu without Chiang’s knowledge.

Public opinion called for Chiang Wei-ling to be suspended pending investigation.

=== July 13, 2014 ===
Chen Zhenyuan held a press conference, asserting that Chiang Wei-ling was not involved. In a post-conference statement, Chen claimed that there was no plagiarism or data fabrication in the papers themselves. Regarding the fake accounts, he argued that they were created unintentionally due to keyboard input errors during manuscript submission and revision, which caused the information system to automatically generate multiple co-author accounts, and that there was no malicious intent.

=== July 14, 2014 ===
The Executive Yuan of the Republic of China announced that Chiang Wei-ling had resigned as Minister of Education.

== Government investigation and sanctions ==
=== September 25, 2014 ===
The Academic Ethics Committee of Taiwan’s Ministry of Science and Technology (MOST) issued preliminary findings confirming peer review fraud. Proposed sanctions included:

- A 10-year ban on Chen Zhenyuan from applying for MOST funding
- A 5-year ban on Chen Zhenwu
- Recovery of more than NT$2 million in research grants obtained during the period in question

The case was submitted to Minister Chang San-cheng for final determination.

During the MOST investigation, it was further found that, in addition to the 60 retracted JVC papers, Chen Zhenyuan had published a paper in Nature Hazards whose introduction was copied from Wikipedia. Approximately one-third of the paper consisted of citations from other works, and about 90% of those citations referenced papers authored by Chen Zhenyuan and Chen Zhenwu, raising suspicions of deliberate inflation of citation metrics.

Additionally, Chiang Wei-ling was reported for alleged self-plagiarism in one of the retracted Journal of Vibration and Control papers in which he was listed as a co-author. The paper was suspected of substantially duplicating content from another JVC paper published in 2010 that had not been retracted. Comparative analysis found multiple paragraphs to be nearly identical word-for-word, without proper citation.

On October 16, MOST’s Academic Ethics Committee initially ruled to impose a three-year funding ban on Chiang Wei-ling, pending final approval.

=== October 26, 2014 ===
MOST formally decided to impose a 10-year ban on Chen Zhenyuan from applying for research grants. Sanctions against Chen Zhenwu and Chiang Wei-ling remained undecided at that time.

=== November 26, 2014 ===
The British journal Nature published a feature article titled “The Peer-Review Scam”, reviewing the incident and concluding that the Chen Zhenyuan case, together with the Wen Hyeong-yoon case, exposed security vulnerabilities in automated manuscript submission and review systems such as ScholarOne.

=== February 6, 2015 ===
MOST decided to impose a 10-year ban on Chen Zhenwu and to recover principal investigator fees from three research projects. Chiang Wei-ling received a one-year ban.

== Subsequent developments ==
=== March 6, 2016 ===
The international journal Human Factors and Ergonomics in Manufacturing & Service Industries announced the retraction of three papers published by Chen Zhenwu between 2012 and 2013. These papers listed only Chen Zhenwu and other scholars as authors, without Chen Zhenyuan. Retraction Watch concluded that Chen Zhenwu was not merely an innocent bystander in the case, prompting MOST to reopen its investigation.

The Ministry of Education stated that after the incident, National Kaohsiung University of Science and Technology verified that several papers submitted by Chen Zhenwu for promotion contained problems. The university decided to revoke his professorship, demote him to associate professor, and recover excess salary payments. Chen Zhenwu filed an administrative appeal.

After court proceedings, the Ministry of Education initially lost the case, appealed, and the Supreme Administrative Court ultimately ruled to vacate the original judgment, revoke the appeal decision and the original administrative sanction, and ordered the case to be reinvestigated and re-sanctioned accordingly. As a result, Chen Zhenwu currently holds the rank of associate professor.

== Similar cases ==
=== 2012 ===
At Dong-A University in South Korea, agricultural scientist Wen Hyeong-yoon was found to have created 24 fake email accounts to impersonate peer reviewers for his own submissions to the Journal of Medicinal Biology. As a result, 35 papers were retracted.

=== March 2015 ===
BioMed Central retracted 43 papers from its journals, mostly authored by Chinese researchers, after discovering fabricated peer review activities. The Washington Post reported on the incident and explicitly compared it to the Chen Zhenyuan case.
