= Pingtung Art Museum =

Museum in Pingtung City, Pingtung County, Taiwan

- 屏東市立美術館

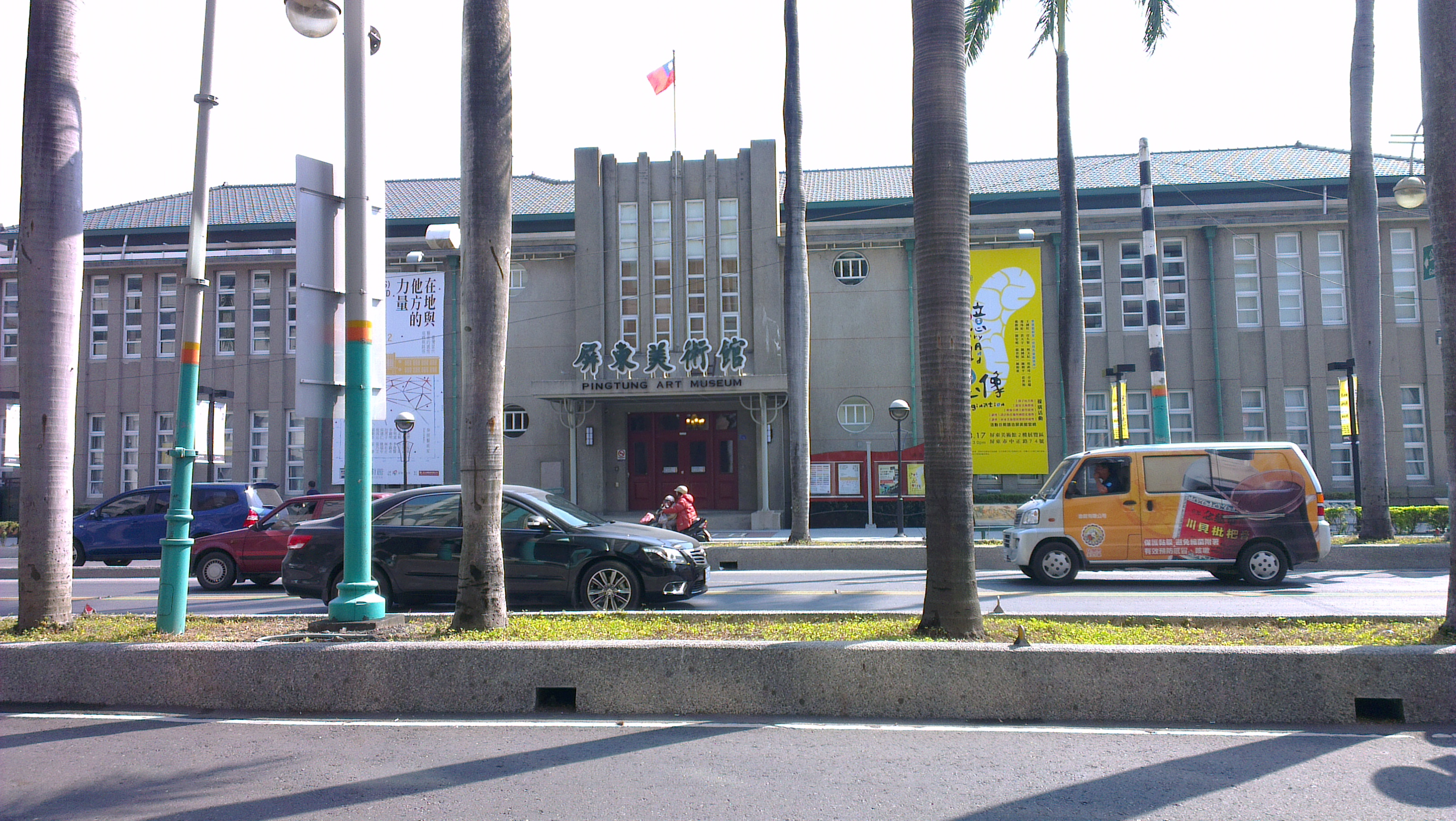
- Established: 12 January 2013
- Location: Pingtung City, Pingtung County, Taiwan
- Type: art museum

The Pingtung Art Museum (traditional Chinese: 屏東市立美術館; simplified Chinese: 屏东市立美术馆; pinyin: Píngdōng Shìlì Měishùguǎn) is an art museum in Pingtung City, Pingtung County, Taiwan.

== History ==
The construction of the building which houses the museum was completed in October 1953 and housed the Pingtung City Government. In July 2005, the city government moved to a new site and the old building was left vacant. In 2006, the city government signed an agreement with Pingtung County Government to lend the building to the county government and convert it into a museum. The building was then turned into the Pingtung Art Museum with funds from the Council for Cultural Affairs. On 16 January 2012, the lease agreement ended and the museum was handed over back to the city government. On 12 January 2013, the museum was officially opened to the public.

== Transportation ==
The museum is accessible within walking distance north from Pingtung Station of the Taiwan Railway.

== See also ==
- List of museums in Taiwan
