= Wang Su-yun =

Taiwanese politician

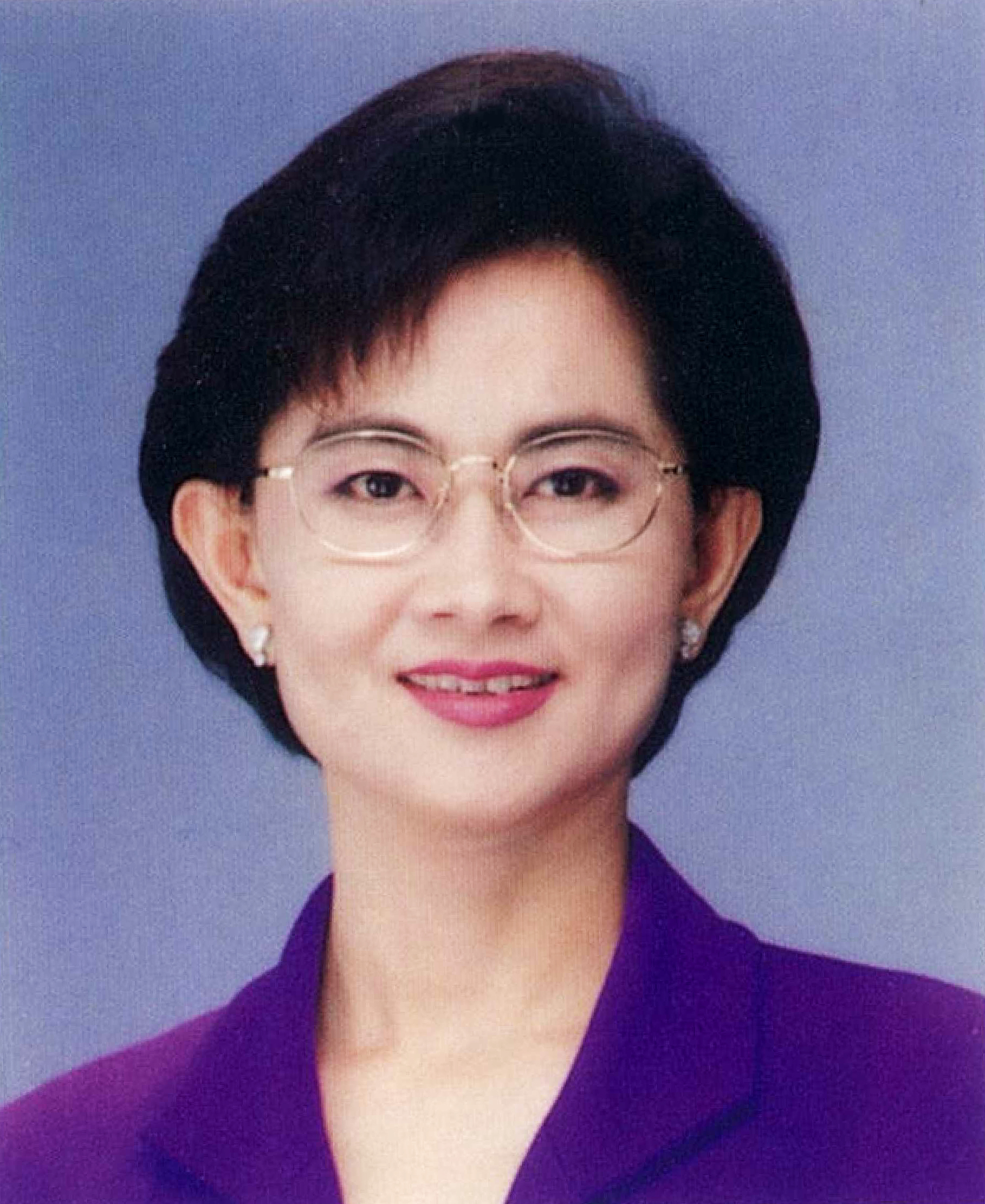
Portrait of Wang Su-yun

Wang Su-yun (Chinese: 王素筠; born 19 February 1953) is a Taiwanese politician.

== Early life ==
Wang attended the National Pingtung Girls' Senior High School, and married Ho Chih-hui.

== Political career ==
Wang served on the Pingtung County Council for four terms prior to her election to the Legislative Yuan in 1989. She returned to the national legislature in 1996 and served until 1999. After she completed her second term as a lawmaker, Wang contested an open seat on the Kuomintang Central Standing Committee in 2000. Wang, Ho, and 27 others were indicted in 2004 and charged with violating the Securities Transaction Law. Both Wang and Ho left Taiwan for China in 2010; the ongoing legal action continued into 2019.
