= Guilai railway station =

Railway station located in Pingtung, Taiwan

Guilai Station 歸來車站
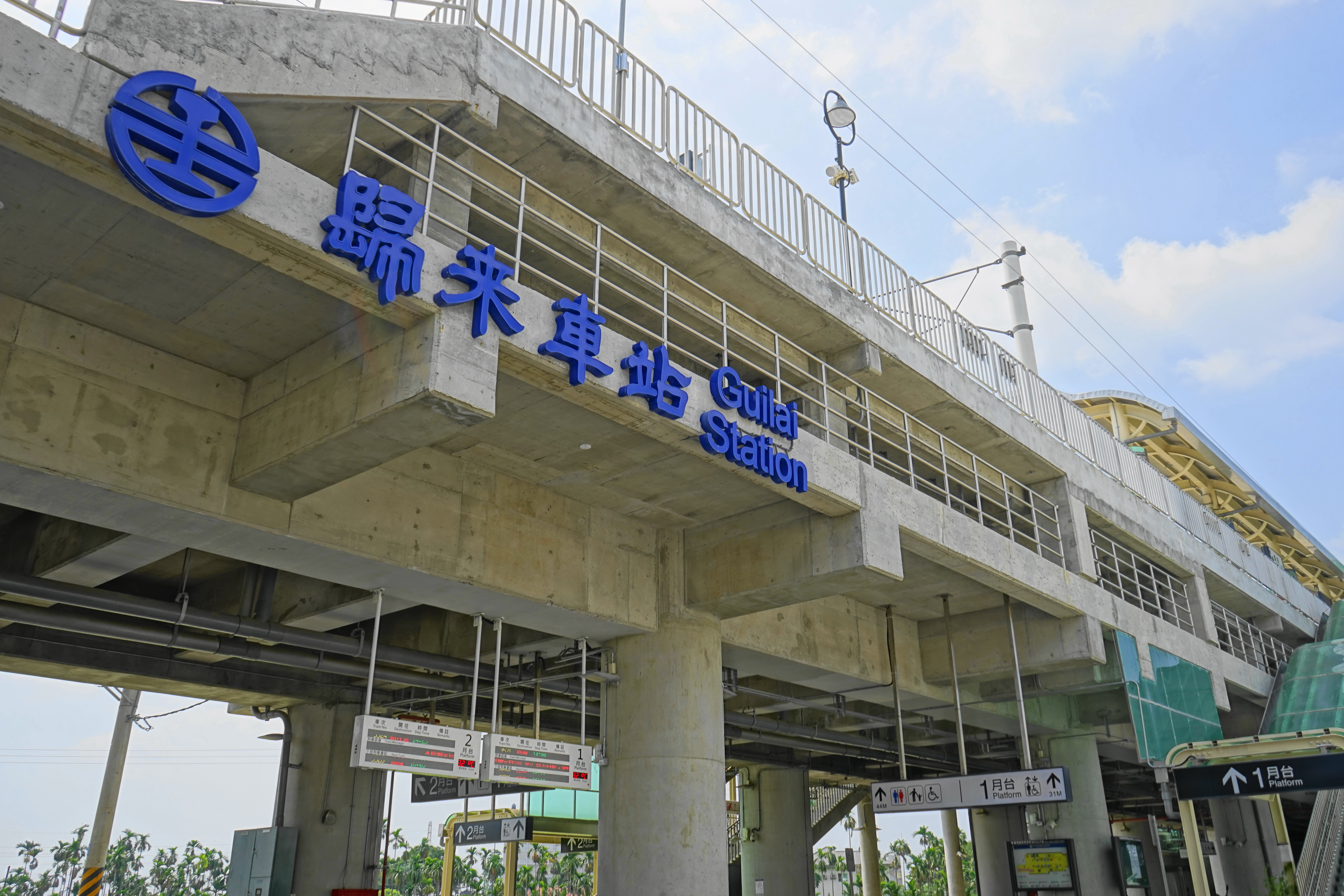

Chinese name
- Traditional Chinese: 歸來車站
Transcriptions
Standard Mandarin
- Hanyu Pinyin: Guīlái Chēzhàn
- Bopomofo: ㄍㄨㄟ ㄌㄞˊ ㄔㄜ ㄓㄢˋ

General information
- Location: Pingtung City; Taiwan
- Coordinates: 22°39′08.7″N 120°30′09.4″E
- System: Taiwan Railway railway station
- Line: Pingtung line
- Distance: 23.6 km to Kaohsiung
- Platforms: 2 side platforms

Construction
- Structure type: Elevated

Other information
- Station code: 191

History
- Opened: 1 May 1956; 70 years ago

Passengers
- 2017: 48,557 per year
- Rank: 171

Services
Preceding station	Taiwan Railway	Following station
Pingtung towards Kaohsiung	Western Trunk line (Pingtung)	Linluo towards Fangliao
Location

Guilai railway station (Chinese: 歸來車站; pinyin: Guīlái Chēzhàn) is a railway station located in Pingtung City, Pingtung County, Taiwan. It is located on the Pingtung line and is operated by Taiwan Railway.

== Around the station ==
- National Pingtung University
