= NPIC =

NPIC may stand for

- National Photographic Interpretation Center, an imagery intelligence agency that was one of the predecessors of the National Geospatial-Intelligence Agency (NGA)
- National Pesticide Information Center
- National Pingtung Institute of Commerce, a former university in Taiwan
- Non-profit Industrial Complex
