= Pingtung City =

County-administered city in Pingtung County, Taiwan

Coordinates: 22°40′34″N 120°29′39″E

Pingtung 屏東市 Heitō
- County-administered city
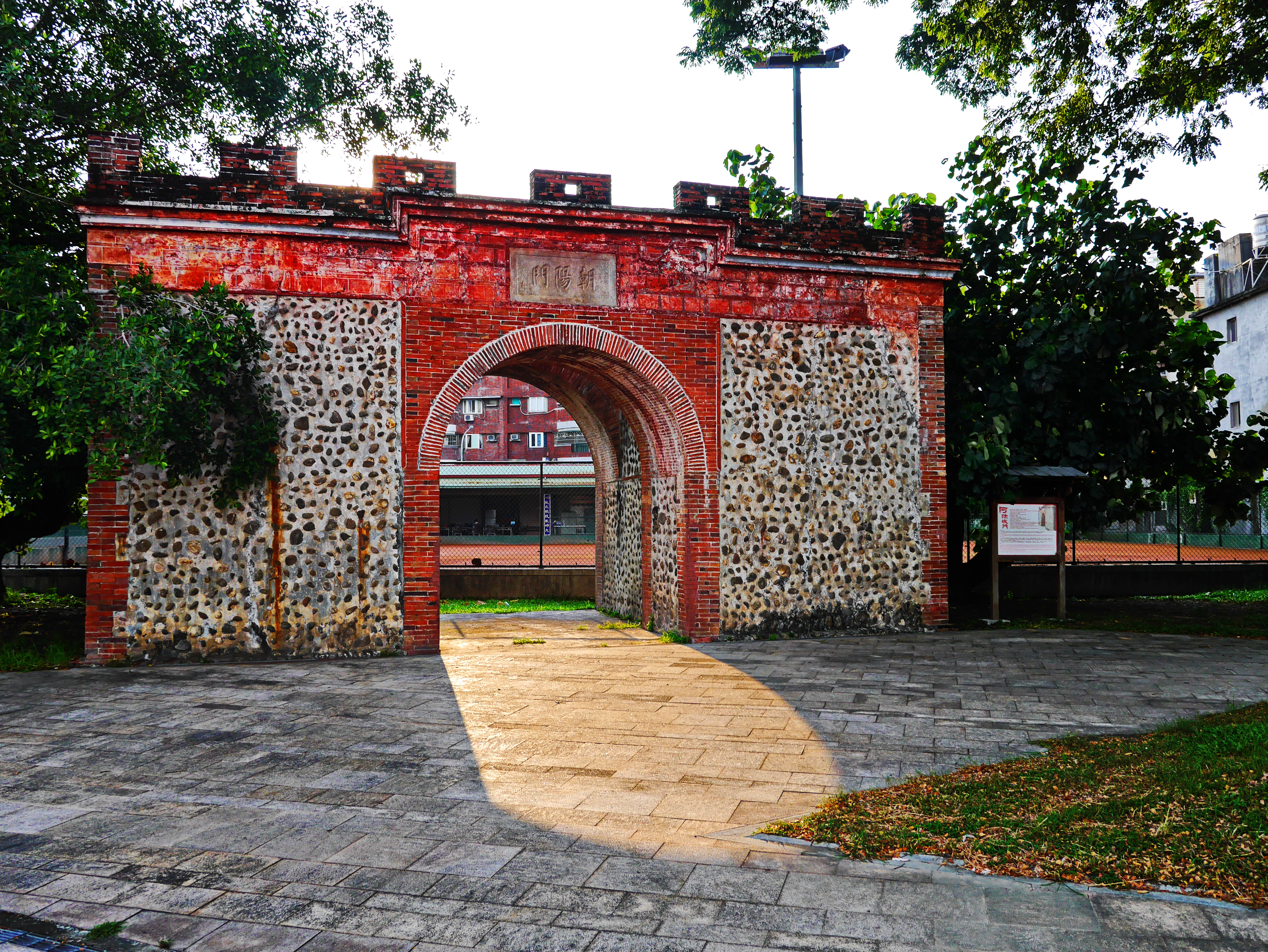
- Old city gate in Pingtung Park

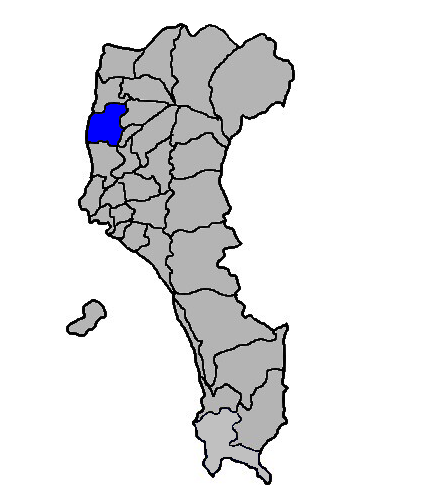
- Pingtung City in Pingtung County
- Country: Republic of China (Taiwan)
- County: Pingtung County
- Capital: North West District (西北區)

Government
  - Mayor: Lin Ya-chun (林亞蒓)

Area
  - Total: 66.03 km^{2} (25.49 sq mi)

Population (February 2024)
  - Total: 193,563
  - Density: 2,931/km^{2} (7,592/sq mi)
- Website: http://www.ptcg.gov.tw/

Pingtung City
- Traditional Chinese: 屏東市
- Simplified Chinese: 屏东市
Transcriptions
Standard Mandarin
- Hanyu Pinyin: Píngdōng Shì
- Bopomofo: ㄆㄧㄥˊ ㄉㄨㄥ ㄕˋ
- Gwoyeu Romatzyh: Pyngdong Shyh
- Wade–Giles: Pʻing²-tung¹ Shih⁴
- Tongyong Pinyin: Píngdong Shìh
- Yale Romanization: Píngdūng Shr̀
- MPS2: Píngdūng Shr̀
- IPA: [pʰǐŋ.tʊ́ŋ ʂɻ̩̂]
Hakka
- Pha̍k-fa-sṳ: Phìn-tûng-sṳ
Southern Min
- Hokkien POJ: Pîn-tong-chhī
- Tâi-lô: Pîn-tong-tshī

Pingtung City (Paiwan: Akaw; pinyin: Píngdōng Shì; Hokkien POJ: Pîn-tong-chhī) is a county-administered city and the county seat of Pingtung County, Taiwan.

== History ==
The area of modern-day Pingtung City was originally a village of the Taiwanese Plains Aborigines which they called "Akau", which means "the forest". After the expulsion of the Dutch, the village grew into a Chinese market-town called "A-kau" (Chinese: 阿猴; Pe̍h-ōe-jī: A-kâu).

=== Empire of Japan ===
In 1901, during the Japanese era, Akō Chō (Japanese: 阿猴廳) was one of twenty local administrative offices established. In 1909, this unit was merged with Banshoryō Chō (蕃薯寮廳) and Kōshun Chō (恆春廳) to form Akō Chō (阿緱廳). Beginning in 1920, the name was changed to Heitō Town (屏東街), governed under Takao Prefecture. In 1933, the town was upgraded to City status.

=== Republic of China ===
After the handover of Taiwan to the Republic of China from Japan on 25 October 1945, Pingtung City was established as a provincial city of Taiwan Province in December the same year. On 1 December 1951, it was downgraded to a county-administered city of Pingtung County and has been administered as such since that time.

== Geography ==
Pingtung City is located in northwestern Pingtung County. It is centered between the western coast and the eastern mountain range on the Pingtung Plain. Many residents work in Kaohsiung and commute daily by train.

=== Climate ===
Pingtung City is located within the tropics and has a tropical monsoon climate. The warmest month is July and the coldest month is January. The warm season lasts from mid March to late November with an average daytime temperature of over 30 degrees Celsius. The short cooler season starts in mid December and lasts until late February, and features relatively warm days and cool nights with temperatures ranging from 15-27 degrees Celsius. Pingtung County is the hottest county in Taiwan and Pingtung City is well-known for high daytime temperatures year round.

Climate data for Pingtung (Changzhi) (1991–2020 normals, extremes 1995–present)
Month	Jan	Feb	Mar	Apr	May	Jun	Jul	Aug	Sep	Oct	Nov	Dec	Year
Record high °C (°F)	33.2 (91.8)	34.7 (94.5)	37.9 (100.2)	37.4 (99.3)	38.9 (102.0)	39.7 (103.5)	38.2 (100.8)	37.3 (99.1)	38.8 (101.8)	36.5 (97.7)	35.3 (95.5)	32.4 (90.3)	39.7 (103.5)
Mean daily maximum °C (°F)	25.1 (77.2)	26.2 (79.2)	28.2 (82.8)	30.3 (86.5)	32.2 (90.0)	33.3 (91.9)	33.5 (92.3)	32.8 (91.0)	32.7 (90.9)	31.3 (88.3)	29.2 (84.6)	26.1 (79.0)	30.1 (86.1)
Daily mean °C (°F)	19.2 (66.6)	20.5 (68.9)	22.8 (73.0)	25.3 (77.5)	27.4 (81.3)	28.5 (83.3)	28.6 (83.5)	28.0 (82.4)	27.6 (81.7)	26.3 (79.3)	24.0 (75.2)	20.6 (69.1)	24.9 (76.8)
Mean daily minimum °C (°F)	15.1 (59.2)	16.1 (61.0)	18.5 (65.3)	21.4 (70.5)	23.9 (75.0)	25.0 (77.0)	25.2 (77.4)	24.9 (76.8)	24.5 (76.1)	22.9 (73.2)	20.3 (68.5)	16.6 (61.9)	21.2 (70.2)
Record low °C (°F)	5.5 (41.9)	8.2 (46.8)	6.9 (44.4)	13.8 (56.8)	18.5 (65.3)	20.8 (69.4)	22.1 (71.8)	21.0 (69.8)	21.0 (69.8)	17.7 (63.9)	10.7 (51.3)	6.1 (43.0)	5.5 (41.9)
Average precipitation mm (inches)	16.9 (0.67)	16.8 (0.66)	26.7 (1.05)	65.9 (2.59)	197.9 (7.79)	445.2 (17.53)	508.9 (20.04)	586.6 (23.09)	311.1 (12.25)	62.8 (2.47)	21.1 (0.83)	17.2 (0.68)	2,277.1 (89.65)
Average precipitation days	3.2	3.0	3.5	5.4	9.8	12.0	15.7	18.8	13.1	5.6	3.2	3.1	96.4
Average relative humidity (%)	76.4	76.3	74.8	75.2	77.4	79.0	80.5	83.2	80.8	77.8	76.5	75.9	77.8
Mean monthly sunshine hours	174.0	169.7	186.9	180.3	181.2	175.3	187.4	167.0	164.6	188.2	166.9	149.2	2,090.7
Source: Central Weather Administration (precipitation days 1995–2020, sun 2001–2020)

== Administrative divisions ==
Villages in Pingtung City

The city is administered as 79 villages: Anle, Anzeng, Beishi, Beixing, Bixin, Chonglan, Chongli, Chongwu, Chongzhi, Dahu, Dalian, Dapu, Datong, Dawu, Dazhou, Dingliu, Dingzhai, Duanzheng, Fengrong, Fengtian, Fengyuan, Fufeng, Gongguan, Goumei, Guanghua, Guangrong, Guangxing, Guixin, Haifeng, Hexing, Housheng, Huashan, Hunan, Huxi, Jianguo, Jinquan, Kongxiang, Lingyun, Longhua, Mingzheng, Minquan, Nanshu, Pengcheng, Pinghe, Qianjin, Qiaobei, Qiaonan, Qingchun, Qingxi, Renai, Renyi, Ruiguang, Sanshan, Shengfeng, Shengli, Siwen, Taian, Taiping, Tanqi, Wannian, Weixin, Wenming, Wumiao, Xingle, Xinhe, Xinsheng, Xinxing, Yixin, Yiyong, Yongan, Yongchang, Yongcheng, Yongguang, Yongshun, Yucheng, Zeren, Zhangan, Zhangchun and Zhongzheng.

== Government institutions ==
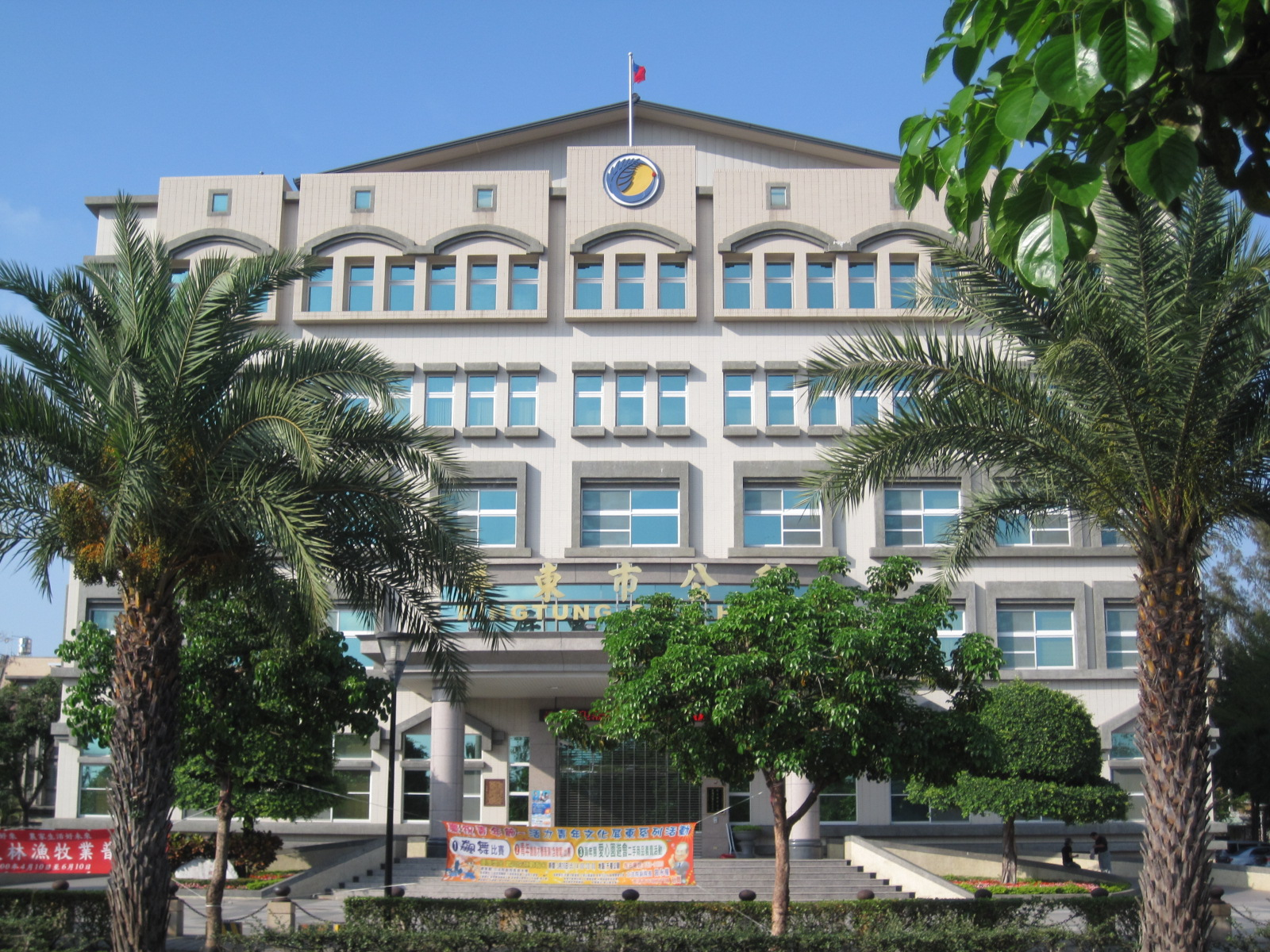
Pingtung City Hall

- Pingtung County Government
- Pingtung County Council

== Education ==
- National Pingtung University
- National Pingtung Senior High School
- 國立屏東女中 National Pingtung Girls' Senior High School
- 國立屏東高工 National Pingtung Industrial Vocational Senior High School
- 縣立大同中學 Pingtung County Tah-Tung Senior High School
- 私立屏榮高中 Private Ping-Jung High School
- 私立陸興中學 Private Loo-Hsing High School
- 私立華洲工家職業學校 Private Hua-Chou Senior Industrial & Domestic Science Vocational School
- 私立民生家商職業學校 Private Minsheng Economics & Commercial Vocational High School

== Tourist attractions ==
- Pingtung Art Museum
- Pingtung Baseball Field
- Pingtung Performing Arts Center
- Pingtung Tutorial Academy
- Zhong-Sheng-Gong Memorial

== Transportation ==
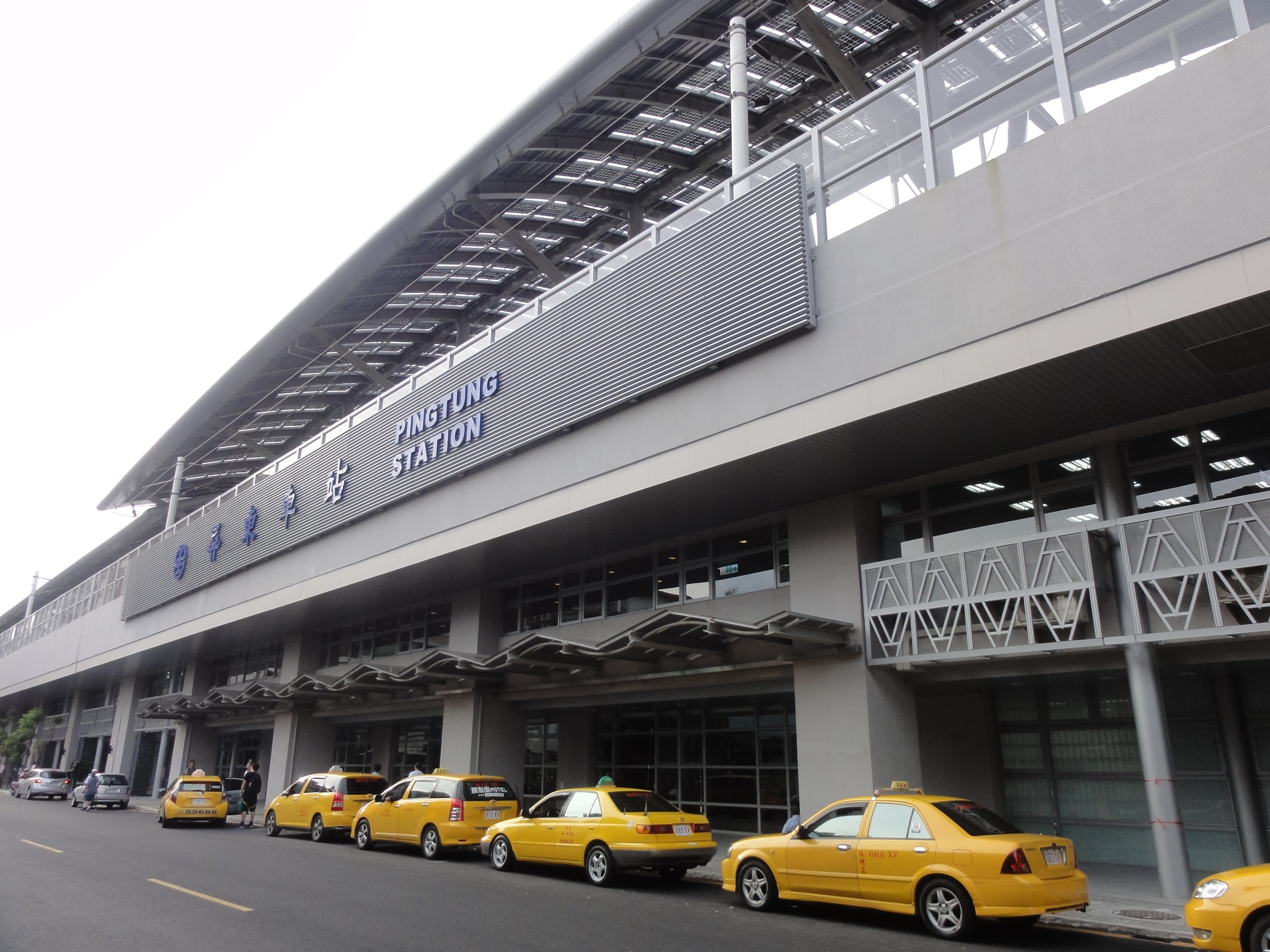
Pingtung Station

=== Rail ===
==== Taiwan Railway ====
- Guilai railway station
- Liukuaicuo railway station
- Pingtung railway station

==== Taiwan High Speed Rail ====
There is no high speed rail station in Pingtung. The nearest high speed rail station is Zuoying, which is accessible by regular rail services from Pingtung.

=== Bus ===
Pingtung Bus (屏東客運), UBus (統聯客運) and Kuo-Kuang Bus operate services from Pingtung Bus station near Pingtung Rail Station.

== Notable people from Pingtung City ==
- Fu-Te Ni, baseball player
- Hope Lin, actress
- Pan Wei-lun, baseball player
- Su Tseng-chang, Premier of the Republic of China
- Ang Lee, film director of Brokeback Mountain, Crouching Tiger Hidden Dragon, and Life of Pi
- Ella Chen, singer and actress
- Shino Lin, singer and actress
- Chou Chun-mi, Magisrate of Pingtung County
- Tzeng Shing-Kwei, composer
- Wen-Hsiung Li, biologist

== Bibliography ==
- Campbell, William (1903). "Explanatory Notes". Formosa under the Dutch: described from contemporary records, with explanatory notes and a bibliography of the island. London: Kegan Paul. ISBN 978-957-638-083-9. LCCN 04007338.
