= Liukuaicuo railway station =

Railway station located in Pingtung City, Pingtung County, Taiwan

Liukuaicuo Station 六塊厝車站
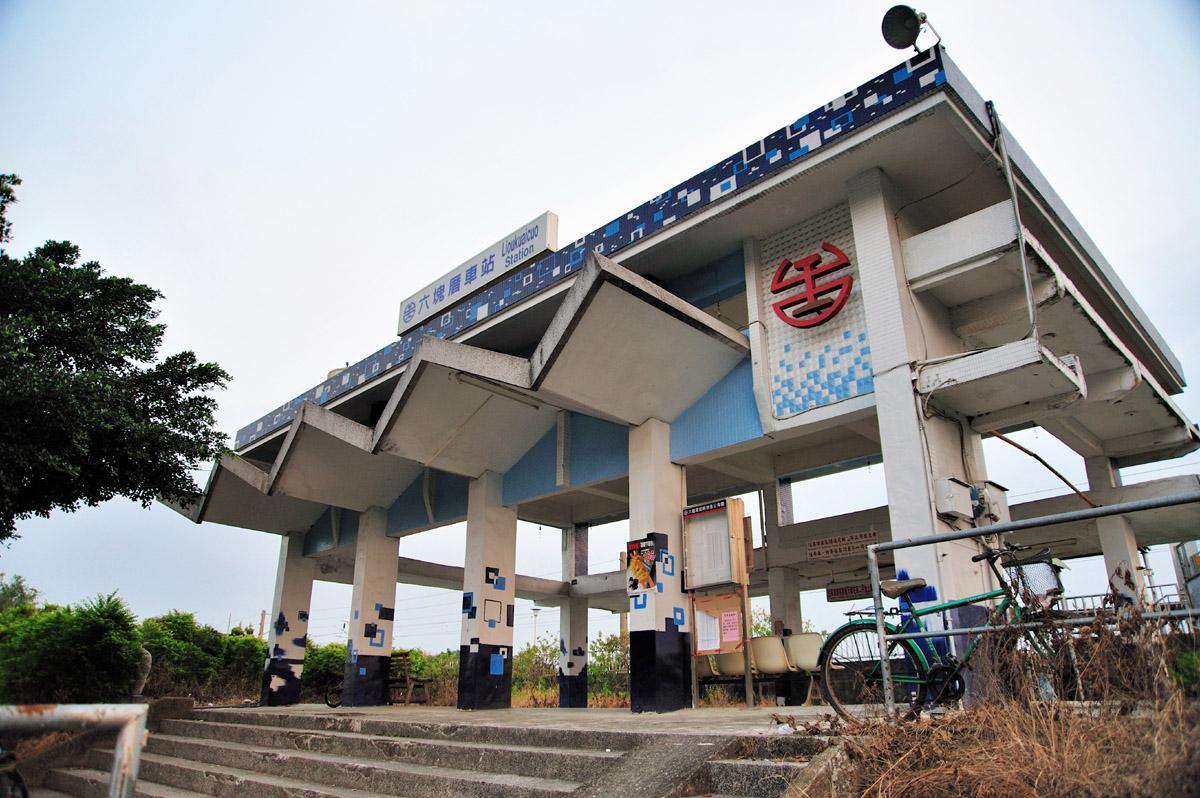

General information
- Location: Pingtung City, Pingtung County, Taiwan
- Coordinates: 22.665987°N 120.465°E
- System: Train station
- Owner: Taiwan Railway Corporation
- Operator: Taiwan Railway Corporation
- Line: Western Trunk line (Pingtung)
- Train operators: Taiwan Railway Corporation

History
- Opened: 20 December 1913; 112 years ago

Passengers
- 326 daily (2024)
Location

Liukuaicuo (traditional Chinese: 六塊厝車站; simplified Chinese: 六块厝车站; pinyin: Liùkuàicuò Chēzhàn), formerly spelled Lioukuaicuo, is a railway station on Taiwan Railway Pingtung line located in Pingtung City, Pingtung County, Taiwan.

== History ==
The station was opened on 20 December 1913. In October 2021, the station was proposed to be the new southern terminus of Taiwan High Speed Rail extension from the existing Zuoying HSR station in Zuoying District, Kaohsiung.

== See also ==
- List of railway stations in Taiwan

Preceding station	Taiwan Railway	Following station
Jiuqutang towards Kaohsiung	Western Trunk line (Pingtung)	Pingtung towards Fangliao
