= Pingtung railway station =

Railway station in Pingtung, Taiwan

Pingtung 屏東
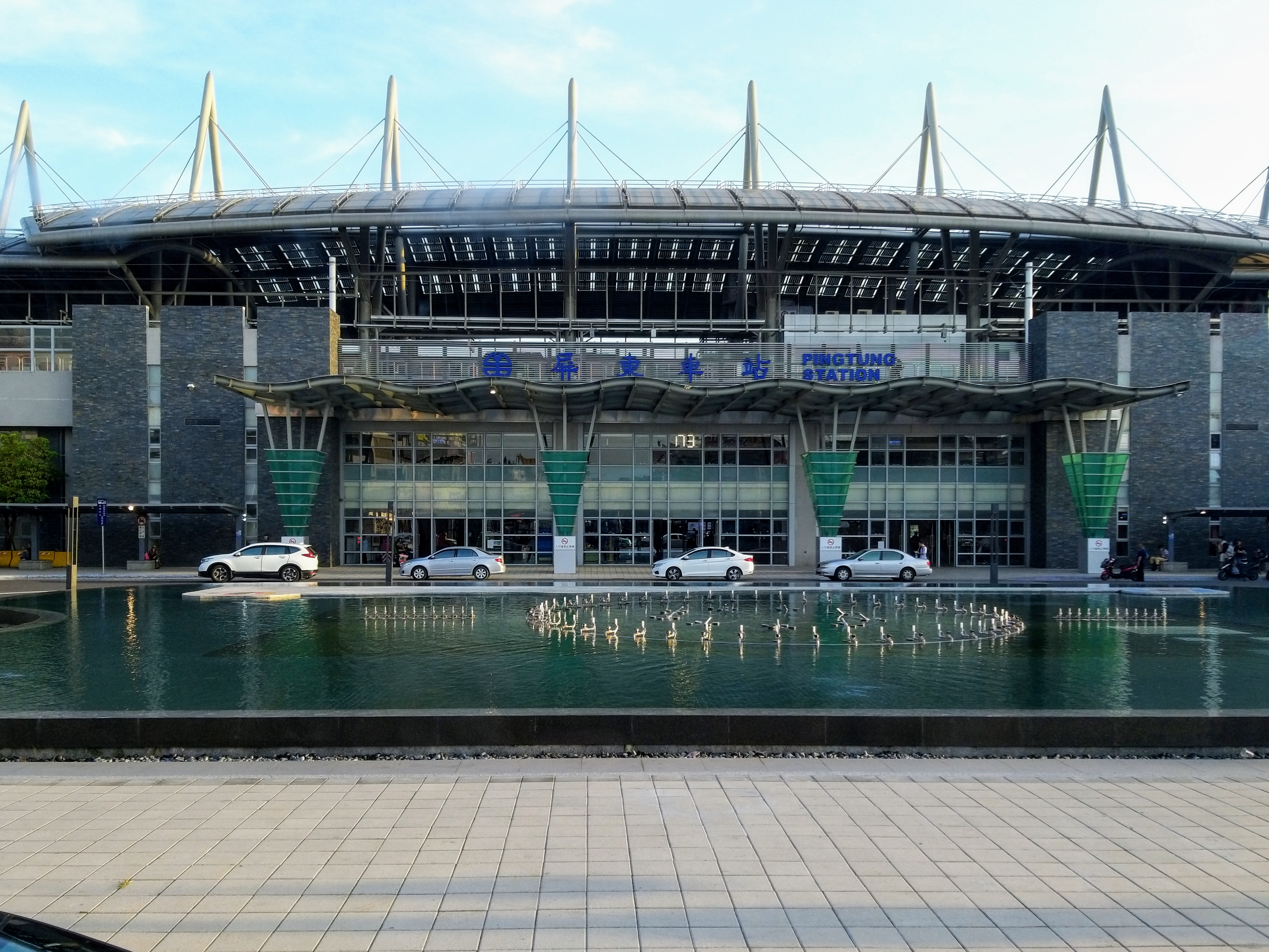

Chinese name
- Traditional Chinese: 屏東
Transcriptions
Standard Mandarin
- Hanyu Pinyin: Píngdōng
- Bopomofo: ㄆㄧㄥˊ ㄉㄨㄥ
Hakka
- Romanization: Pǐn-dúng (Sixian dialect); Pin-dùng (Hailu dialect)
Southern Min
- Tâi-lô: Pîn-tong

General information
- Location: 62 Gongyong Rd; Pingtung City, Pingtung County; Taiwan
- Coordinates: 22.6689°N 120.4860°E
- System: Taiwan Railway railway station
- Line: Western Trunk line
- Distance: 420.8 km to Keelung via Taichung
- Connections: Local bus; Coach

Construction
- Structure type: Elevated

Other information
- Station code: P05 (statistical)
- Classification: First class (Chinese: 一等)
- Website: www.railway.gov.tw/Pingtung/index.aspx (in Chinese)

History
- Opened: 24 December 1913; 112 years ago
- Rebuilt: 5 October 1962; 63 years ago 23 August 2015; 11 years ago
- Electrified: 10 July 1996; 30 years ago
- Former names: Heitō (Japanese: 屏東)

Passengers
- 2017: 7.387 million per year ▲1.95%
- Rank: 14 out of 228

Services
Preceding station	Taiwan Railway	Following station
Terminus	Western Trunk line (Pingtung)	Guilai towards Fangliao
Liukuaicuo towards Keelung	Western Trunk line	Terminus
Location
- Location within Taiwan

Pingtung (Chinese: 屏東; pinyin: Píngdōng) is a railway station in Pingtung County, Taiwan served by Taiwan Railway.

== Overview ==
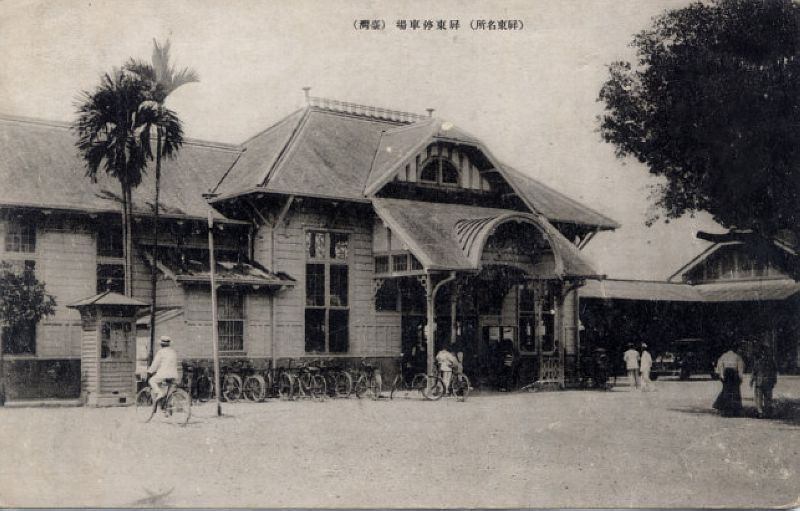
The first Pingtung Station building, built in 1913

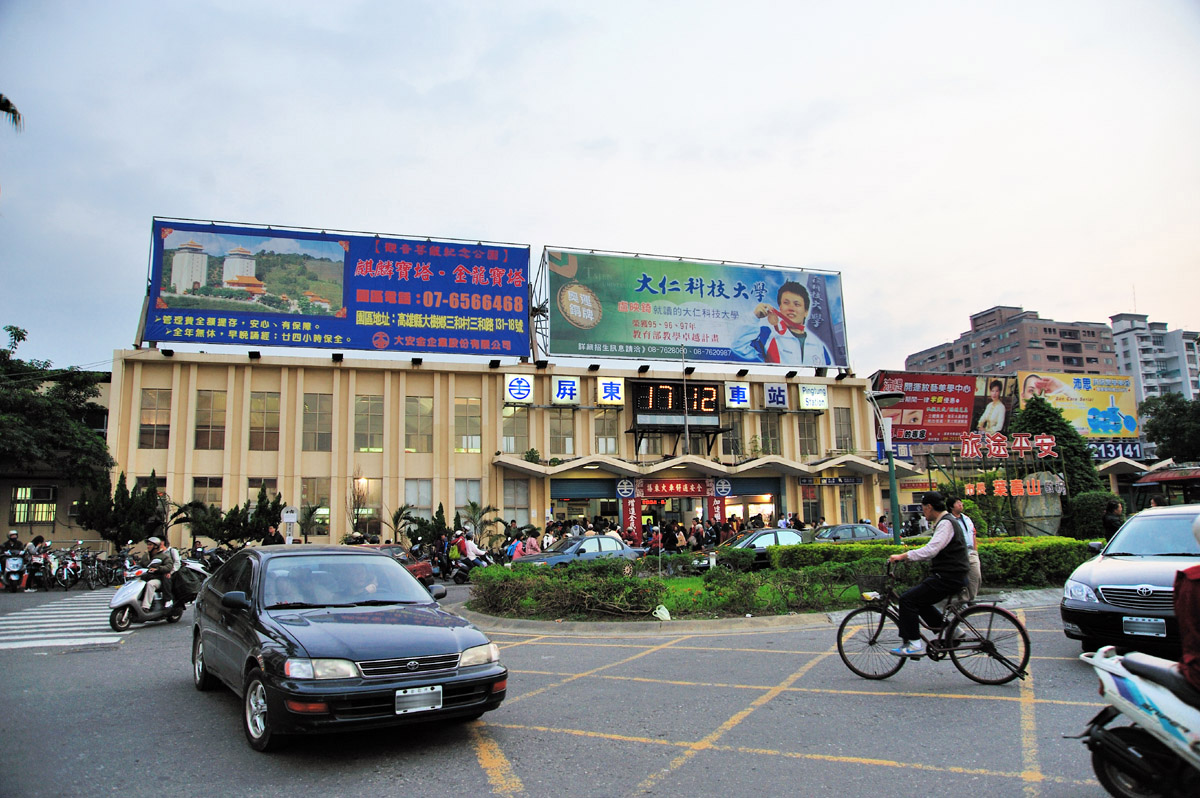
The second Pingtung Station building, built in 1962

The station has two island platforms. It was rebuilt on elevated tracks on 23 August 2015.

=== History ===
- 20 December 1913: The station opened as Akō Station (Japanese: 阿緱驛).
- 1 October 1920: Because the location was east of Mount Banping, the area and station became known as Heitō (屏東; "Ping-East", hence "Pingtung").
- 5 October 1962: Station rebuilt.
- 23 August 2015: Station rebuilt on elevated tracks.

== Platform layout ==
1	1A	■ West Coast line (southbound) ■ South-link line (southbound) ■ East Coast line (northbound) ■ West Coast line (southbound through traffic)	Toward Chaozhou, Fangliao, Taitung, Hualien
2	1B	■ West Coast line (southbound) ■ South-link line (southbound) ■ East Coast line (northbound) ■ West Coast line (southbound through traffic)	Toward Chaozhou, Fangliao, Taitung, Hualien
2	1B	■ West Coast line (northbound departure)	Toward Kaohsiung, Xinzuoying, Chiayi, Douliu, Ershui
3	2A	■ West Coast line (northbound) ■ West Coast line (northbound departure) ■ East Coast line (southbound through traffic)	Toward Kaohsiung, Xinzuoying, Chiayi, Douliu, Fengyuan, Qidu, Keelung, Su'ao, Hualien
4	2B	■ West Coast line (northbound) ■ West Coast line (northbound departure)	Toward Kaohsiung, Xinzuoying, Chiayi, Douliu, Fengyuan, Qidu, Keelung

== Station layout ==
3F	Platform 1A	■West Coast line / South-link line / East Coast line Toward Chaozhou, Fangliao, Taitung, Hualien
3F	Island platform
3F	Platform 1B	■West Coast line / South-link line / East Coast line Toward Chaozhou, Fangliao, Taitung, Hualien
	Platform 2A	■West Coast line / East Coast line Toward Kaohsiung, Taichung, Keelung, Hualien
Island platform
	Platform 2B	■West Coast line / East Coast line Toward Kaohsiung, Taichung, Keelung, Hualien
2F	Concourse	Turnstile, Waiting room, Shopping Center, Toilets, Railway Police Bureau
1F	Lobby	Entrance/exit; Ticket office, ticket machine, station master, tourism bureau, baggage room, shopping center, toilets

== Around the station ==
- National Pingtung University, Minsheng Campus
- Pingtung Art Museum
- Pingtung County Government
- Pingtung County Council
- Pingtung Performing Arts Center
- Pingtung Tutorial Academy
- Zhong-Sheng-Gong Memorial
- Pingtung Night Market
- Tangrong Elementary School
- Zhongzheng Elementary School
- Bus transfer stations

== See also ==
- List of railway stations in Taiwan
