= Pingtung Performing Arts Center =

Performance center in Pingtung City, Pingtung County, Taiwan

- 屏東演藝廳
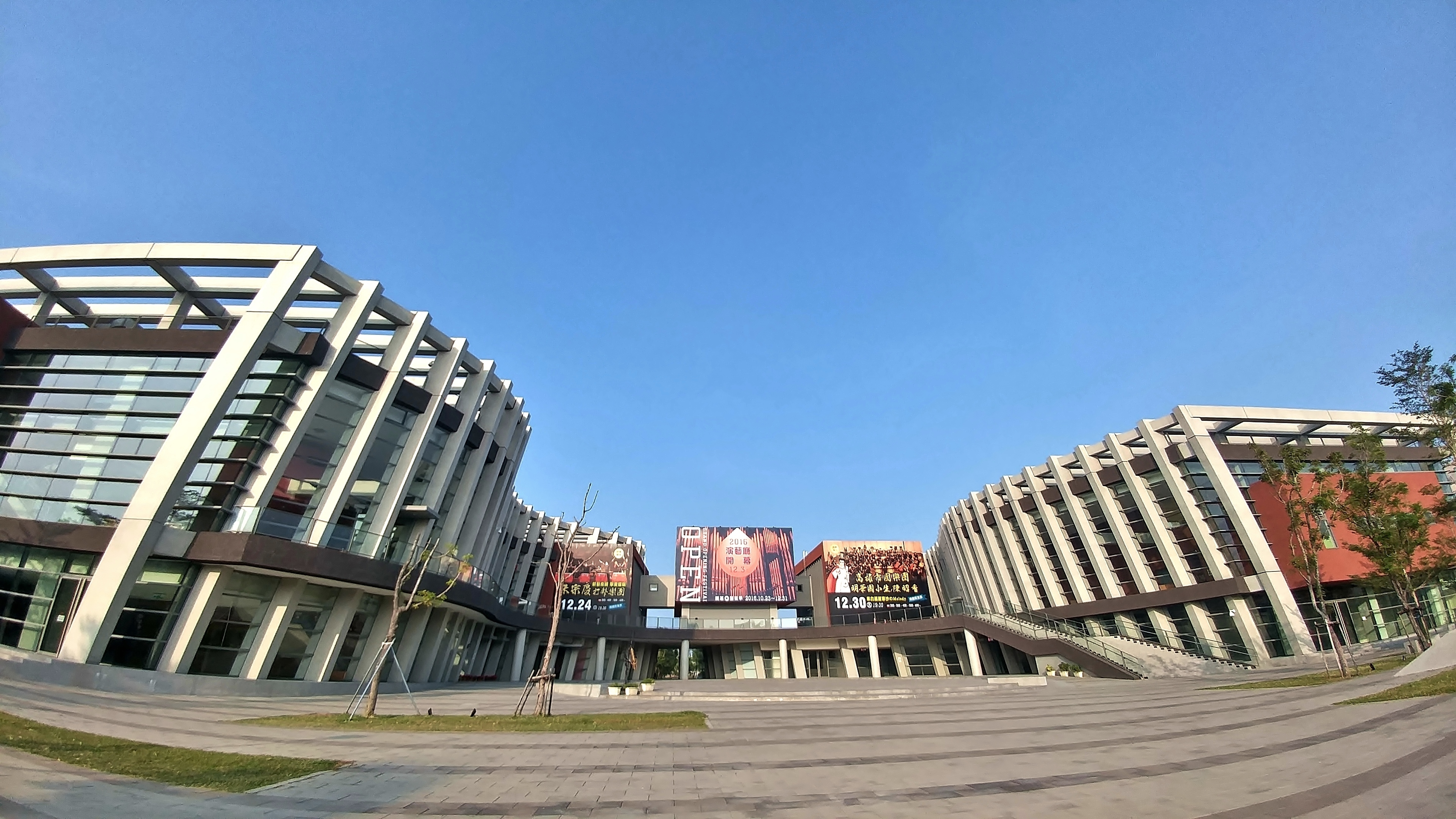
- Interactive map of Pingtung Performing Arts Center
- Location: Pingtung City, Pingtung County, Taiwan
- Coordinates: 22°39′49.6″N 120°30′20.9″E
- Type: performance center

Construction
- Groundbreaking: 2007
- Opened: 27 September 2014

Website
- Official website (in Chinese)

The Pingtung Performing Arts Center (traditional Chinese: 屏東演藝廳; simplified Chinese: 屏东演艺厅; pinyin: Píngdōng Yǎnyìtīng) is a performance center in Pingtung City, Pingtung County, Taiwan. The performing arts center is Southern Taiwan's first county/city-level concert hall with a pipe organ. Built by Alexander Schuke Potsdam Orgelbau in 2013, the bamboo organ has 3 manuals, 45 stops and 2,793 pipes.

== History ==
The construction of the arts center began in 2007. It was then opened on 27 September 2014.

== Architecture ==
The arts center consists of music hall, multipurpose theater and open air plaza with a capacity of 1,200 audiences. The building is designed with Southern Taiwan architectural style.

== Transportation ==
The arts center is accessible within walking distance east of Pingtung Station of Taiwan Railway.

== See also ==
- List of tourist attractions in Taiwan
