= Pingtung Tutorial Academy =

Former tutorial academy in Pingtung City, Pingtung County, Taiwan

- 屏東書院
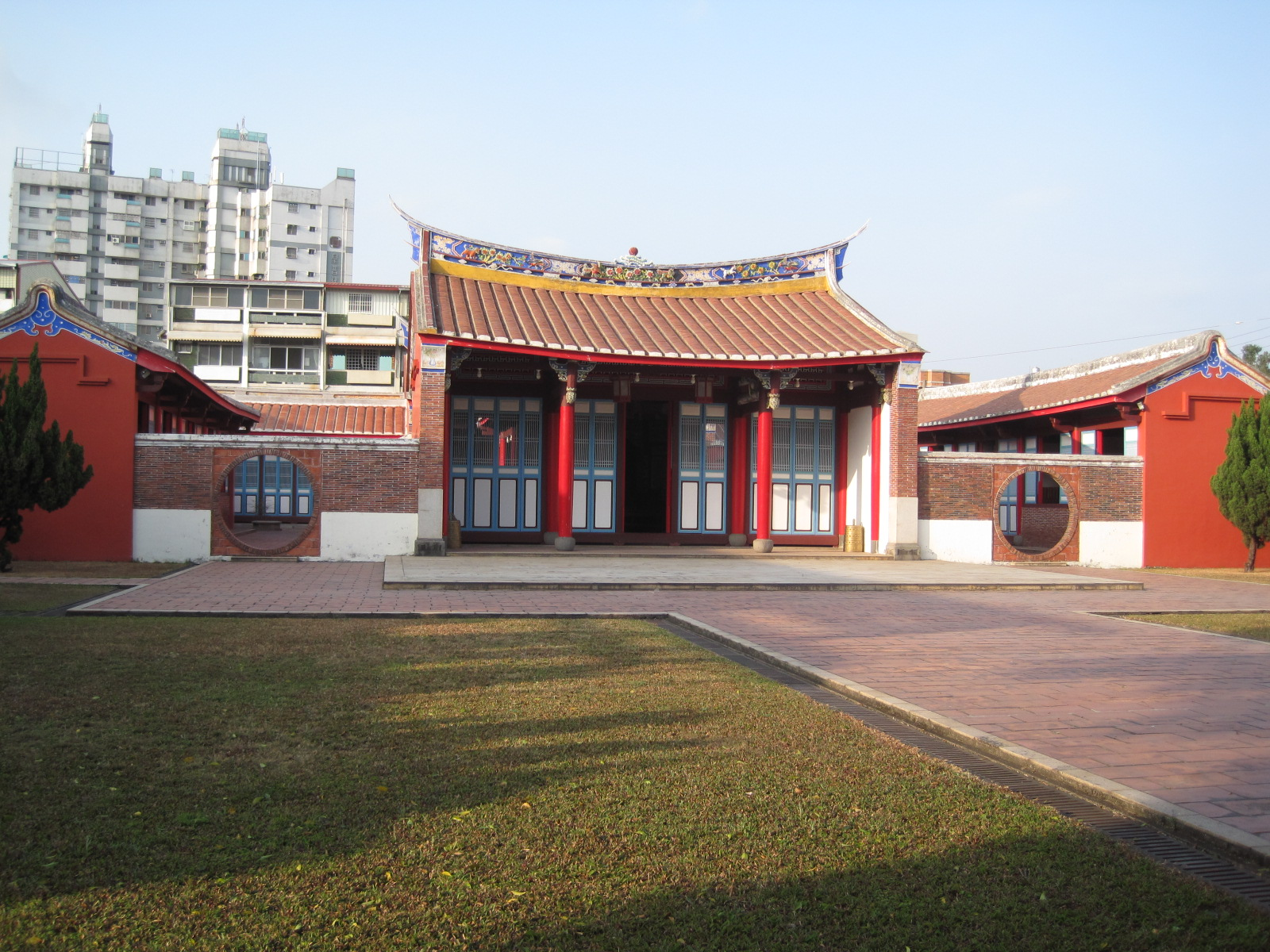

Location
- Pingtung City, Pingtung County, Taiwan
- Coordinates: 22°40′44.2″N 120°29′34.4″E

Information
- Type: former academy
- Established: 1815

The Pingtung Tutorial Academy (traditional Chinese: 屏東書院; simplified Chinese: 屏东书院; pinyin: Píngdōng Shūyuàn) is a former tutorial academy in Taiping Village, Pingtung City, Pingtung County, Taiwan.

== History ==
The tutorial academy was built in 1815 during the Qing Dynasty rule of Taiwan by Hsiadanshui County Deputy Governor Wu Hsing-chung and scholar Guo Tsui Lin Meng in order to revive local scholastic conducts. In 1895, the tutorial academy was transformed into a Confucius Temple. However, lack of funding to repair the building led to the abandonment of the building. During the Japanese rule of Taiwan in 1937, the Japanese government planned to relocate the temple. However, due to scholars effort in calling out for historical preservation, the academy was relocated to its current site on Shengli Road. In 1977, a well-known architect directed its repair and restoration works. The renovation work was completed in 1979.

== Architecture ==
The building consists of 36 dormitory rooms with its lecture hall situated at the front hall.

== Transportation ==
The building is accessible within walking distance north of Pingtung Station of Taiwan Railway.

== See also ==
- List of tourist attractions in Taiwan
- Fongyi Tutorial Academy
