= Zhong-Sheng-Gong Memorial =

Memorial in Pingtung City, Pingtung County, Taiwan

- 宗聖公祠
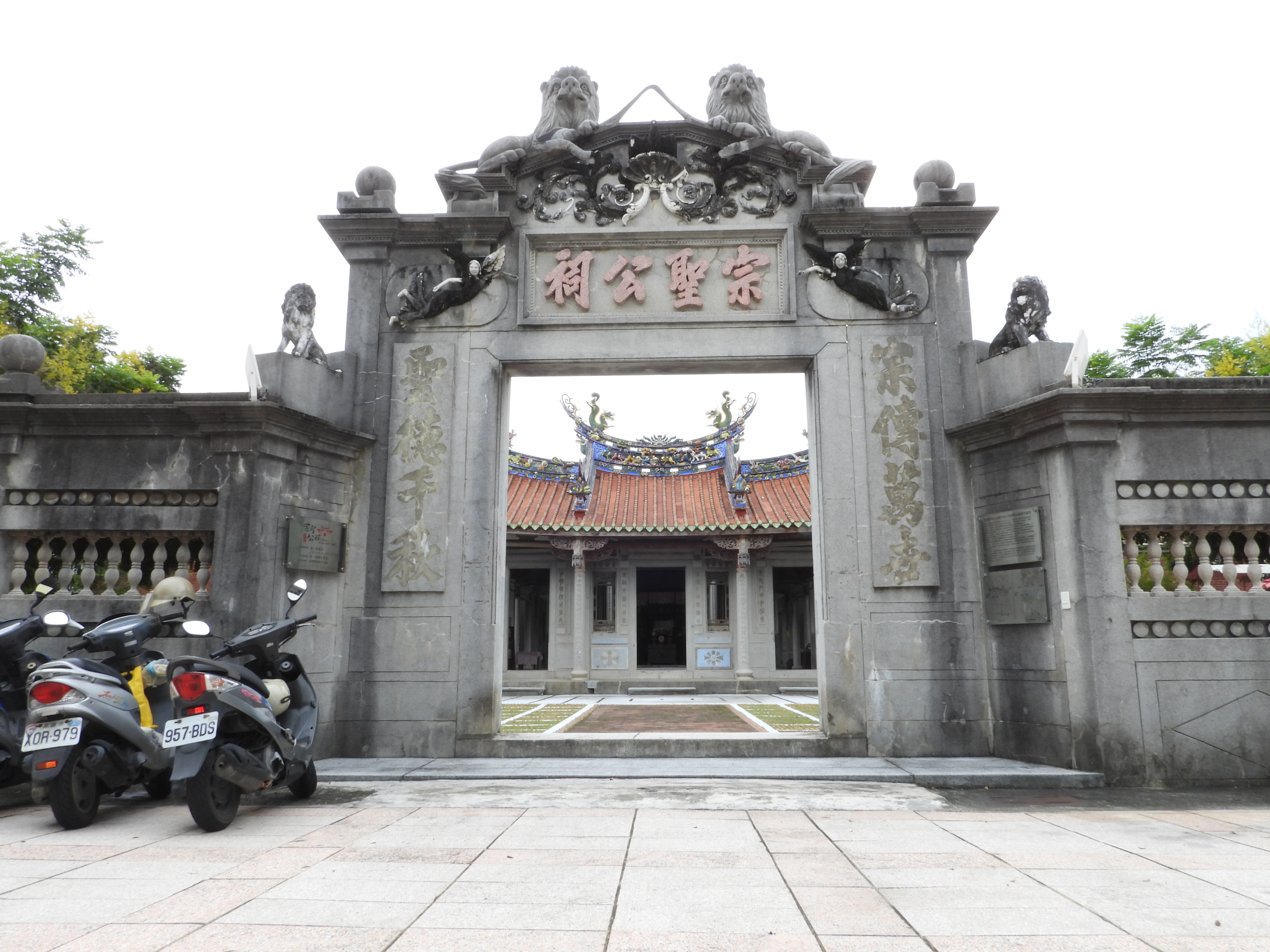
- Interactive map of the Zhong-Sheng-Gong Memorial area

General information
- Type: memorial
- Location: Pingtung City, Pingtung County, Taiwan
- Coordinates: 22°40′1.8″N 120°29′29.4″E
- Completed: 1929

The Zhong-Sheng-Gong Memorial (traditional Chinese: 宗聖公祠; simplified Chinese: 宗圣公祠; pinyin: Zōngshènggōng Cí) is a memorial in Pingtung City, Pingtung County, Taiwan.

== History ==
The memorial was constructed in 1929 by the Zhen clan family members who moved to Taiwan from Guangdong during the Qing Dynasty in the 18th century. It was originally located on the banks of Wannian River. Over the years, more buildings were constructed surrounding the memorial.

== Architecture ==
The memorial was built with traditional Hakka and Baroque architecture style. The memorial spans over an area of 3,010 m^{2} with two blocks and double bays. To honor their ancestors to show off their success, their relatives built the Zhong-Sheng-Gong Memorial in 1929.

== Transportation ==
The memorial is accessible within walking distance east of Pingtung Station of Taiwan Railway.

== See also ==
- Chinese ancestral veneration
- Chaolin Temple
- Donglong Temple
- Checheng Fuan Temple
- Three Mountains King Temple
- List of temples in Taiwan
- List of tourist attractions in Taiwan
