= National Pingtung Institute of Commerce =

Former college in Pingtung City, Pingtung County, Taiwan

- 國立屏東商業技術學院
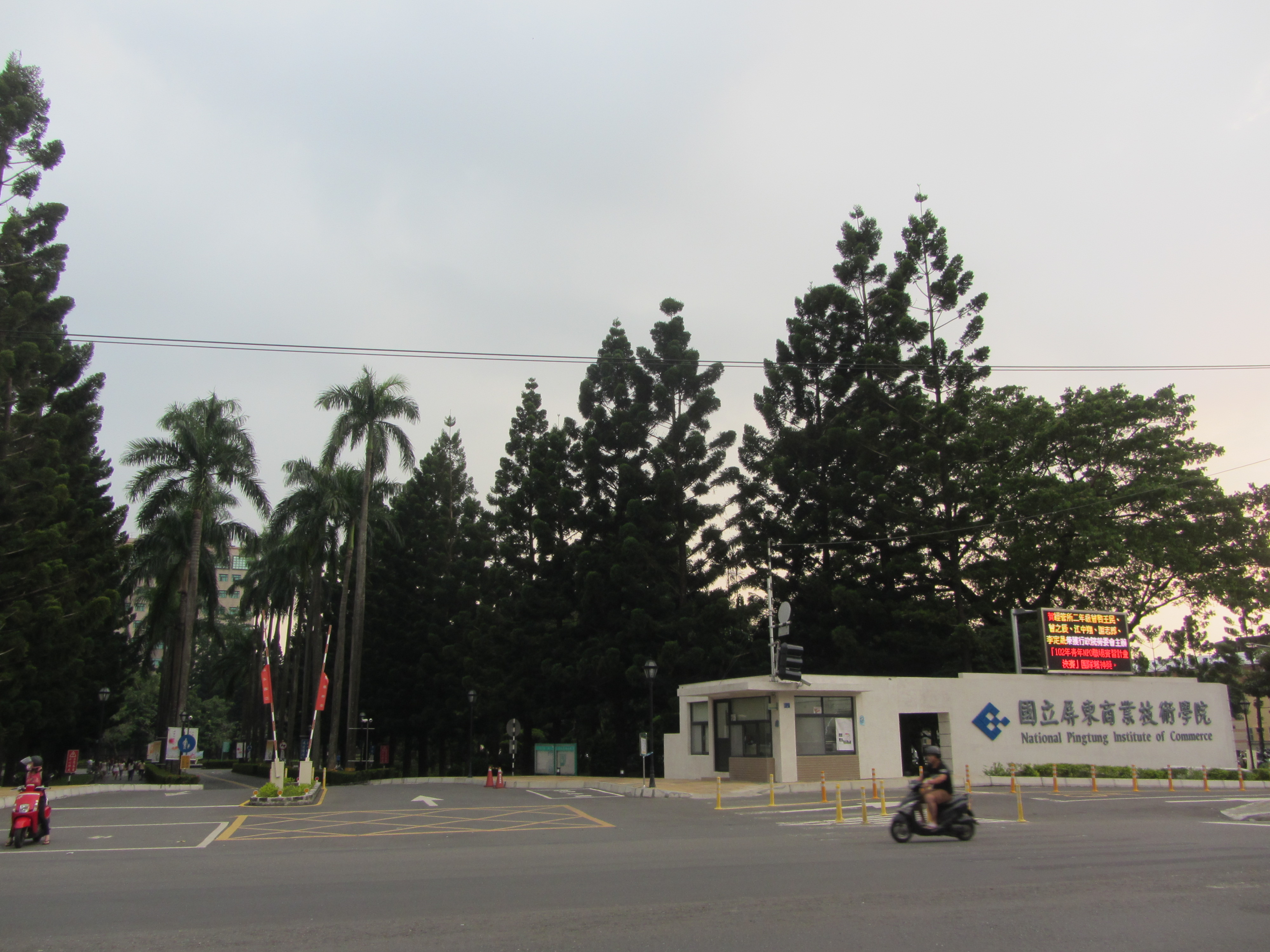
- Type: college
- Active: 1 July 1991–1 August 2014 (as National Pingtung University)
- Location: Pingtung City, Pingtung County, Taiwan; 22.6586°N 120.5114°E

National Pingtung Institute of Commerce (NPIC; traditional Chinese: 國立屏東商業技術學院; simplified Chinese: 国立屏东商业技术学院; pinyin: Guólì Píngdōng Shāngyè Jìshù Xuéyuàn) was a public higher education located in Pingtung City, Pingtung County, Taiwan.

== History ==
NPIC was established on 1 July 1991. On 1 July 1998, NPIC was upgraded to a degree-awarding university-level institute. On 1 August 2014, it was merged with National Pingtung University of Education to form National Pingtung University.

== Faculty ==
- Business Cluster
- Management Cluster
- Information Management Cluster
- Language Cluster

== See also ==
- List of universities in Taiwan
