= Pingtung County Government =

Government of Pingtung County, Taiwan

Coordinates: 22.6833°N 120.4879°E

- 屏東縣政府
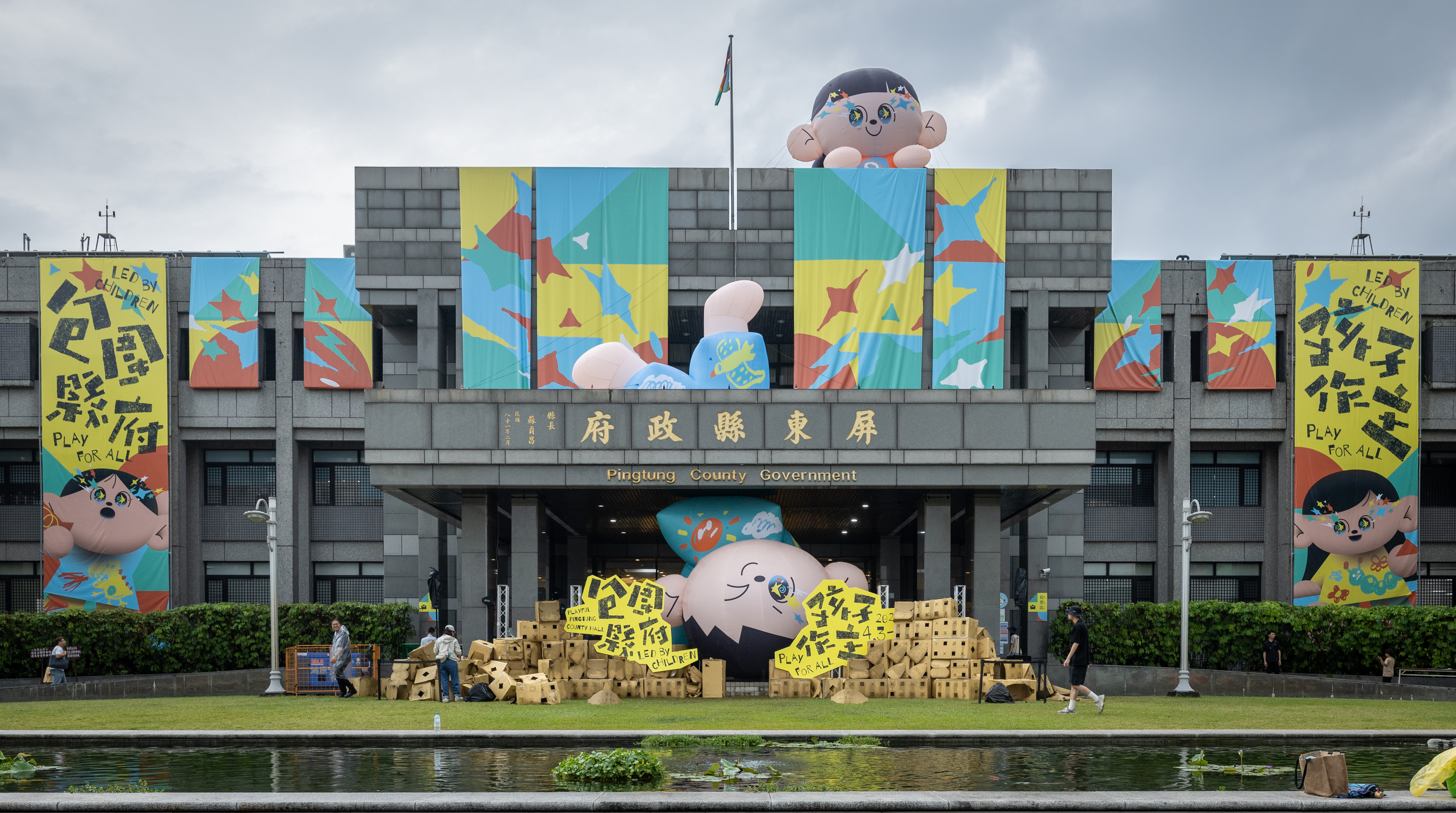

Agency overview
- Jurisdiction: Pingtung County
- Headquarters: Pingtung City
- Agency executive: Chou Chun-mi, Magistrate
- Website: Official website

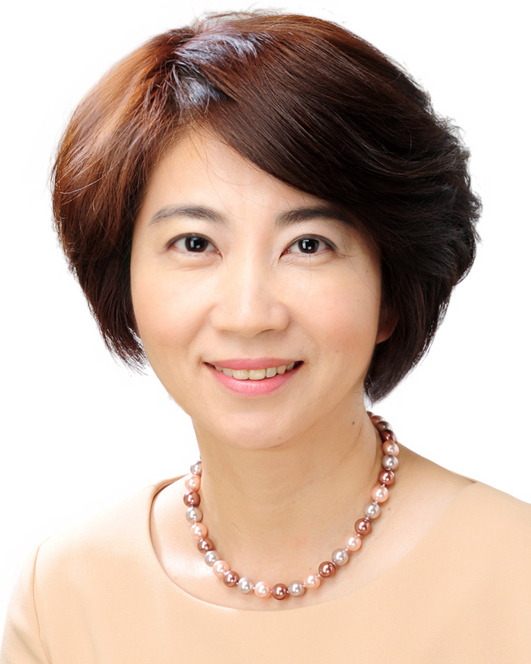
Chou Chun-mi, the incumbent Magistrate of Pingtung County

The Pingtung County Government (traditional Chinese: 屏東縣政府; simplified Chinese: 屏东县政府; pinyin: Píngdōng Xiàn Zhèngfǔ) is the local government of Pingtung County, Taiwan.

== Organizational structures ==
=== Departments ===
- Civil Affairs Department
- Finance Department
- Urban and Rural Development Department
- Public Works Department
- Water Resources Department
- Education Department
- Agriculture Department
- Social Affairs Department
- Labor Affairs Department
- Land Administration Department
- Indigenous Peoples Department
- Cultural Affairs Department
- Hakka Affairs Department
- Information and Tourism Department
- Research and Evaluation Department
- General Affairs Department
- Personnel Department
- Budget, Accounting and Statistics Department
- Government Ethics Department

=== Agencies ===
- Police Bureau
- Fire and Emergency Services Bureau
- Public Health Bureau
- Environmental Protection Bureau
- Local Tax Bureau

== Access ==
The county hall is accessible within walking distance north of Pingtung Station of Taiwan Railway.

== See also ==
- Pingtung County Council
