= Tzeng Shing-Kwei =

Taiwanese composer (1946–2021)

Tzeng shing-Kwei (曾興魁; 1946–2021) was a Taiwanese composer born in Pingtung. He won the Wu San-Lien Award and taught at the Music Department of National Taiwan Normal University and the Department of Information Communications of Kainan University. He served as the Director and Honorary Director of the Taiwan Computer Music Association and died in 2021. He was known for incorporating traditional musical elements with modern music techniques and later delved into digital music composition. His notable works include “Wu Hua( the dream of butterfly, Schmettterlingstraum, Le Rêve du Papillon )”, “Pastorale”, and “Reincarnation”.

== Life and career ==
Tzeng shing-Kwei was born in Pingtung in 1946. He studied music at National Taiwan Normal University between 1968 and 1972 and was later awarded a scholarship to study at the Hochschule für Musik Freiburg in Germany in 1977. After obtaining his Artist Diploma (Pruefung der Kuenstlerische Reife) in 1981, he returned to Taiwan to teach music at National Taiwan Normal University. In 1984, his piece “Pastorale” won first prize in the Ville d'Avray composition competition in Paris, and the same year, his piece “Capriccio” was performed at the Gaudeamus Music Week ASKO Ensemble in the Netherlands.

In 1986, his piece “Reincarnation” won first prize in the 3rd International Organ Composition Competition. From 1986 to 1987, he received a scholarship from the French government and went to the École Normal de Music de Paris to complete his diploma in Screen scoring. During this time, he held personal concerts at the Cité internationale des Arts in Paris and in Rome, Italy. In 1990, he co-founded the “Chinese Taipei section of the ISCM-Chinese Taipei Section with Wen Lung-Hsin and Pan Huang-Lung. He served as the Director of the Taiwan Computer Music Association from 1999 to 2002 and again from 2005 to 2007. After retiring from the music department of National Taiwan Normal University in 2005, he became a professor in the Department of Information Communications at Kainan University. During his time as a professor, Tzeng shing-Kwei continued to create and publish music and essays around the world. He won the 36th Wu San-Lien Award in 2013 and held a concert to commemorate the 30th anniversary of the Wu San-Lien Award in 2018, where he presented his chamber music piece "Wu Hua”. He died in Hsinchu in 2021.
