= Kuo-Kuang Motor Transportation =

Taiwanese bus company

Kuo-Kuang Motor Transportation Co., Ltd. 國光汽車客運股份有限公司
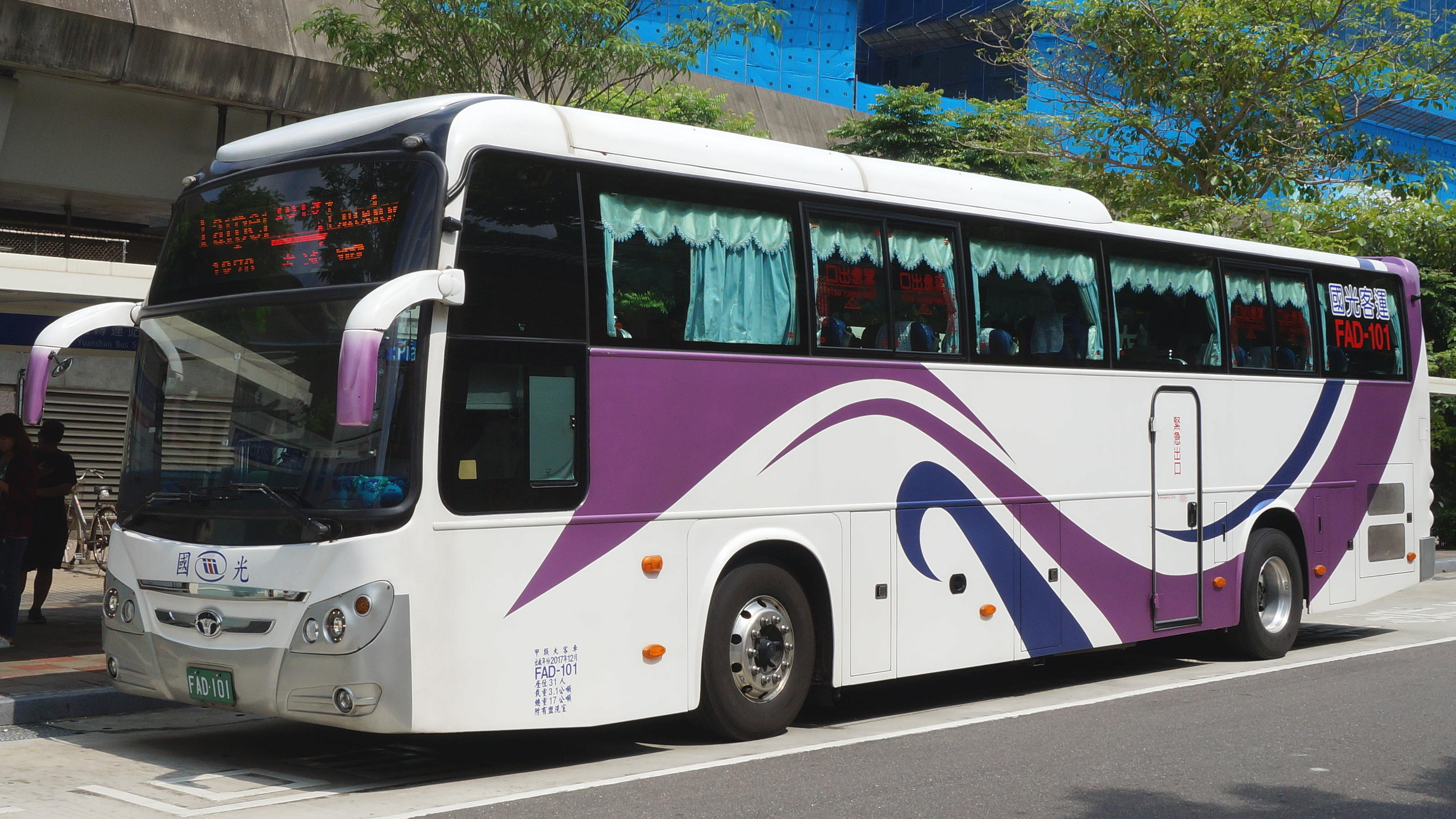
- Founded: 15 June 2001
- Headquarters: Sanchong, New Taipei, Taiwan
- Service type: Bus services
- Website: www.kingbus.com.tw

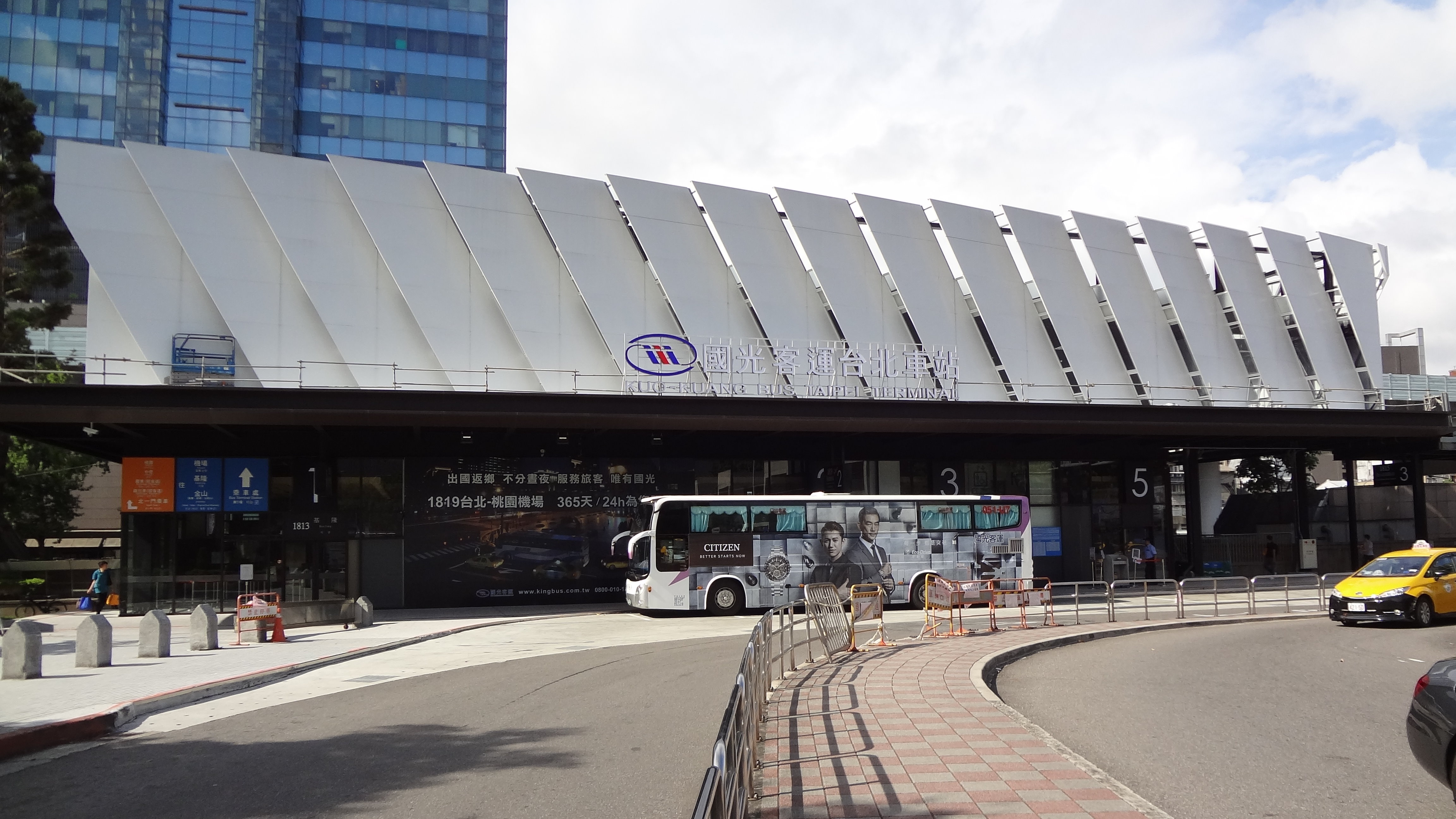
Kuo-kuang Bus Terminal in Taipei

Kuo-Kuang Motor Transportation (Chinese: 國光客運; pinyin: Guóguāng Kèyùn) is a bus company in Taiwan.

== History ==
Kuo-Kuang was established on July 1, 2001, as a result of the privatization of state-owned Taiwan Motor Transport. After the state-run company announced its intention to close, some 1,090 employees each contributed NT$300,000 in order to raise the funds necessary to purchase the firm's assets and relaunch the service as Kuo-Kuang.

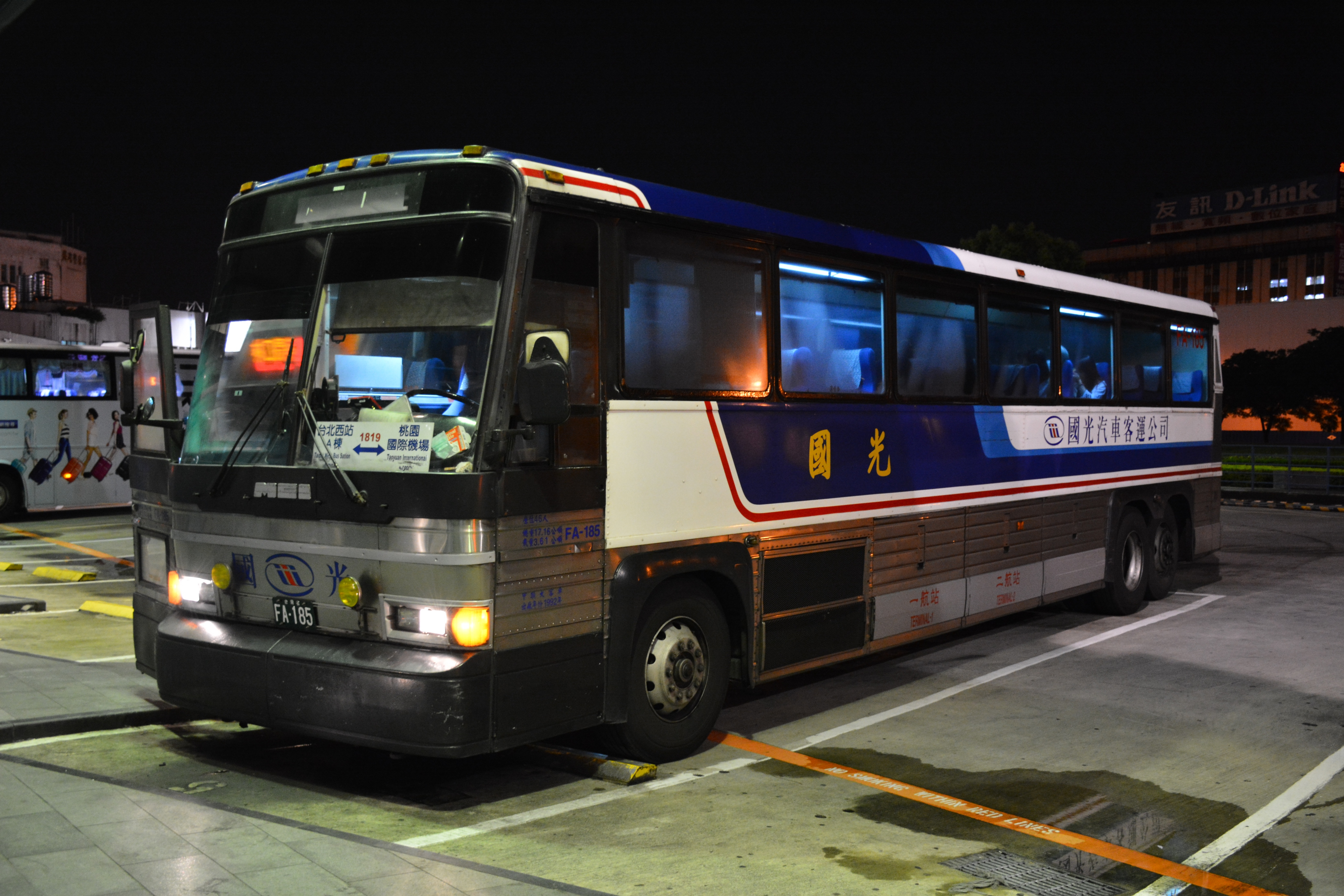
The last MCI 96A3 was retired in 2016

As of 2013, the company's fleet comprised more than 1,200 buses. In January 2016, the final Greyhound buses still being used on regular Kuo-Kuang routes were retired. In November that year, Kuo-Kuang's Taipei Main Station location was moved following the demolition of its historic Taipei West Bus Station home.

In August 2025, Kuo-Kuang ended service for six routes in Kaohsiung and Pingtung County. The cancellation of eight additional routes across Taiwan was announced the following month.

== Incidents ==
On 23 November 2015, the driver of a Kuo-Kuang bus traveling from Taipei to Taichung pulled over on a freeway after an electrical fire broke out. While the driver and passengers were waiting outside the bus, a truck drove into their vehicle, killing the driver and one passenger and injuring 13 more.

On 2 June 2017, a Kuo-Kuang bus heading from Pingtung to Taichung crashed in poor weather, killing one person and injuring 31 others.

On 10 June 2019, a southbound Kuo-Kuang bus collided with the rear of a flatbed semi-trailer along National Freeway 1 killing the bus driver and injuring 7 passengers.

On 13 July 2020, a Kuo-Kuang bus en route to Taipei rear-ended a truck on National Freeway 1 injuring 13 passengers.
