= Journal of Vibration and Control =

- Discipline: Vibration
- Language: English
- Edited by: Mehdi Ahmadian, Fabio Casciati, Fabrizio Vestroni

Publication details
- History: 1995-present
- Publisher: SAGE Publications
- Frequency: 16/year

Standard abbreviations
- ISO 4: J. Vib. Control

Indexing
- CODEN: JVCOFX
- ISSN: 1077-5463 (print); 1741-2986 (web)
- LCCN: 95660075
- OCLC no.: 40095739

Links
- Journal homepage; Online access; Online archive

The Journal of Vibration and Control is a peer-reviewed scientific journal that covers all aspects of linear and nonlinear vibration phenomena and their control. It was established in 1995 and is published by SAGE Publications. The editors-in-chief are Mehdi Ahmadian (Virginia Tech), Fabio Casciati (University of Pavia), and Fabrizio Vestroni (Sapienza University of Rome).

== Peer review fraud ==
In 2014, SAGE Publications retracted 60 papers published in the journal due to a case of academic fraud, in which Peter Chen (National Pingtung University of Education, Taiwan) created false accounts in order to subvert the peer review process. Ali H. Nayfeh, the editor-in-chief of the journal, retired from his academic post and resigned from his position with the journal following completion of the investigation.

== Abstracting and indexing ==
The journal is abstracted and indexed in Scopus and the Science Citation Index Expanded. In 2014 the journal had its impact factor suppressed due to anomalous stacked citation patterns. In 2016, the journal is included in the Journal Citation Reports and its impact factor becomes 1.643
