= National Pingtung University =

University in Pingtung, Taiwan

Coordinates: 22.6698°N 120.4986°E

- 國立屏東大學
- Other name: NPTU
- Former name: Pingtung Normal College
- Motto: 誠、愛、禮、群
- Motto in English: Sincerity, Love, Propriety, Group
- Type: Public
- Established: August 1, 2014
- President: Robert Y.S. Chen
- Location: Pingtung City, Pingtung County, Taiwan
- Campus: Urban
- Website: eng.nptu.edu.tw

National Pingtung University
- Traditional Chinese: 國立屏東大學
- Simplified Chinese: 国立屏东大学
Transcriptions
Standard Mandarin
- Hanyu Pinyin: Guólì Píngdōng Dàxué
Southern Min
- Hokkien POJ: Kok-li̍p Pîn-tong Tāi-ha̍k

National Pingtung University (NPTU; Chinese: 國立屏東大學) is a public university in Pingtung City, Pingtung County, Taiwan.

NPTU offers higher education, vocational education, and teacher education. It provides undergraduate, graduate, and doctoral programs across 7 colleges: Management, Computer Science, Education, Liberal Arts and Social Sciences, Science, International, and Mt. Dawu.

== History ==
The university was established by the merging of National Pingtung University of Education and the National Pingtung Institute of Commerce on 1 August 2014.

In 2018, the Ministry of National Defense R.O.C. collaborated with NPTU to establish the Reserved Officers Training Corps (ROTC) Education Center.

On November 10, 2022, Professor Huang Kuang-nan, also known as an educator and Taiwanese ink painter, donated 47 paintings to his alma mater NPTU. At the same time, NPTU established the Huang Kuang-nan Art Museum at the Art Center.

In 2022, NPTU began hosting TEDxNational Pingtung University. The videos of speakers from each year's event are uploaded to the official TEDx Talks YouTube channel after the conclusion of the event.

== Affiliated school ==
=== The Affiliated Experimental Elementary School of National Pingtung University ===
The Affiliated Experimental Elementary School of National Pingtung University (NPTUPS) focuses on integrating educational research and teacher training into its curriculum.

== Campus ==
=== Minsheng Campus ===
Central to administrative operations, this campus is located at No.4-18, Minsheng Rd., Pingtung City, Pingtung County 900391, Taiwan (R.O.C.). It features a modern multi-administrative building housing administrative offices and the library, with additional amenities including an auditorium and gymnasium.

=== Pingshih Campus ===
This campus is located at No. 1, Linsen Rd., Pingtung City, Pingtung County 900393, Taiwan (R.O.C.). It hosts the Colleges of Science, along with the Music and Visual Arts departments. Facilities include a swimming pool and a student activity hall.

=== Pingshang Campus ===
Dedicated to management education, this campus, located at No.51, Minsheng E. Rd., Pingtung City, Pingtung County 900392, Taiwan (R.O.C.), is home to the College of Management, a library branch, and a FIFA-certified soccer field.

=== Checheng Campus ===
This campus is still in the planning stage and is expected to be developed into the "Marine Culture, Leisure, and Natural Ecological Industry Experience Zone".

== Academics ==
NPTU has seven colleges: Computer Science, Education, Liberal Arts and Social Sciences, Management, Science, International, and Mt. Dawu. Also, NPTU has the Center of Teacher Education.

=== College of Computer Science ===
- Department of Computer and Communication (B.Eng.)
- Department of Computer Science and Information Engineering (B.Eng.; M.S.)
- Department of Computer Science and Artificial Intelligence (B.S.; M.S.)
- Department of Information Management (B.I.M.; M.I.M.)
- Department of Intelligent Robotics (B.Eng.)

=== College of Education ===
- Graduate Institute of Educational Administration (M.Ed.; Ph.D.)
- Department of Educational Psychology and Counseling (B.Ed.; M.Ed.)
- Department of Education (B.Ed.; M.Ed.)
- Department of Early Childhood Education (B.Ed.; M.Ed.)
- Department of Special Education (B.Ed.; M.Ed.)
- Special Education Center
- Community Counseling Center

=== College of Liberal Arts and Social Sciences ===
- Department of Visual Arts (B.A.; M.F.A.)
- Department of Music (B.M.; M.M.)
- Department of Cultural and Creative Industries (B.A.; M.A.)
- Department of Social Development (B.A.; M.A.)
- Department of Chinese Language and Literature (B.A.; M.A.)
- Department of Applied Japanese (B.A.)
- Department of Applied English (B.A.)
- Department of English (B.A.; M.A.)
- Studies of Indigenous Cultural Development. B. A. Program/M. A. Program (B.A.; M.A.)
- Master Program of Hakka Culture Industry (M.S.S.)
- Hakka Studies Center
- Indigenous Education and Research Center
- Art Center

=== College of Management ===
- Department of Commerce Automation and Management (B.S.; M.S.)
- Department of Marketing and Distribution Management (B.B.A.; M.S.)
- Department of Leisure Management (B.B.A.; M.B.A.)
- Department of Real Estate Management (B.B.A.; M.B.A.)
- Department of Business Administration (B.B.A.; M.S.)
- Department of International Business (B.B.A.; M.B.A.)
- Department of Finance (B.B.A.; M.S.)
- Department of Accounting (B.B.A.)
- Bachelor Program of Big Data Applications in Business (B.S.)

=== College of Science ===
- Department of Science Communication (B.S.; M.Ed.)
- Department of Applied Chemistry (B.S.; M.S.)
- Department of Applied Mathematics (B.S.; M.S.)
- Department of Applied Physics (B.S.; M.S.)
- Department of Physical Education (B.P.E.; M.P.E.)
- International Master Program in Applied Science of College of Science (M.S.)
- International Ph.D. Program in Applied Science of College of Science (Ph.D.)
- Semiconductor Materials Science in Master Program of College of Science (M.S.)

=== International College ===
- International Master Program in STEM Education (M.Ed.)
- International Master Program in Information Technology and Application (M.Eng.)

=== Mt. Dawu College ===
- Center for Common Core Education
- Center for Liberal Arts Education
- EMI Development Center
- Center for Interdisciplinary Studies
- Mt. Dawu Center for Social Engagement and Sustainable Development
- MA Creative Application in New Media (M.A.)

== Transportation ==
The Pingshih Campus, Minsheng Campus, and Pingshang Campus are accessible by United Highway Bus Company Limited, Kuo-Kuang Motor Transportation, or Taiwan Railway to Pingtung Station. From there, transfers to Kuo-Kuang Motor Transportation, Ping Tung Bus, or taxi are available to reach each campus. Alternatively, YouBike rentals are also an option for traveling to each campus.

== See also ==
- List of universities in Taiwan
- Education in Taiwan
