= Pingtung County Council =

Council of Pingtung County, Taiwan

Coordinates: 22.6815°N 120.4883°E

Pingtung County Council 屏東縣議會
- 20th Pingtung County Council

Type
- Type: County council

History
- Founded: 1 October 1950
- Preceded by: Pingtung City Senate
- New session started: 25 December 2022

Leadership
- Speaker: Zhou Dian–lun (KMT) since 25 December 2018
- Deputy Speaker: Lu Wen-ruey (KMT) since 26 December 2022

Structure
- Seats: 55
- Political groups: KMT (19); DPP (14); Independent (22)
- Length of term: 4 years

Elections
- Voting system: Single non-transferable vote
- First election: 18 December 1950
- Last election: 26 November 2022

Meeting place
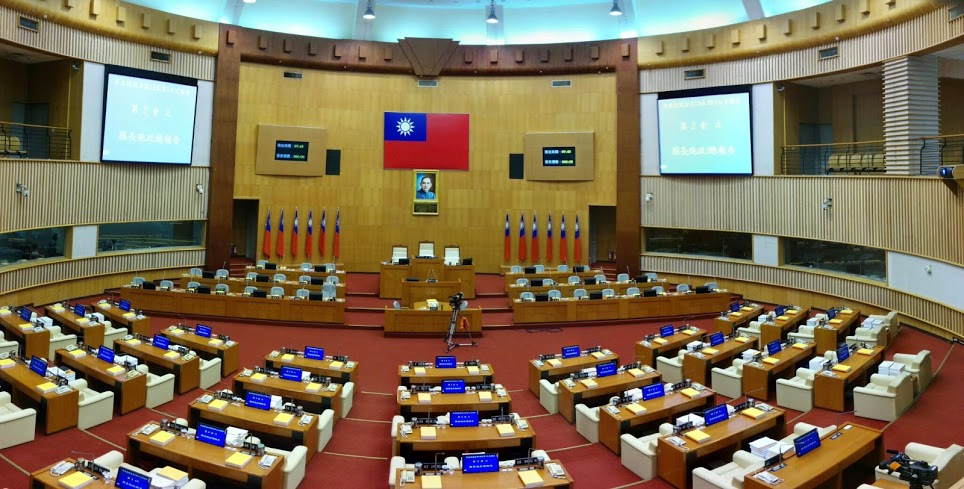
- 223 Zhongxiao Road, Pingtung City, Pingtung County 90065, Taiwan

Website
- Official website (in Chinese)

Constitution
- Constitution of the Republic of China

Pingtung County Council (traditional Chinese: 屏東縣議會; simplified Chinese: 屏东县议会; pinyin: Píngdōng Xiàn Yìhuì) is the county council of Pingtung County, Republic of China. It is currently composed of 55 councillors, all elected in the 2022 Taiwanese local elections. Being the largest county council in terms of seats, it succeeded the former Pingtung City Senate on 1 October 1950 after reorganization of the local governments.

== Organization ==
- Procedural Office
- General Affairs Office
- Administration Office
- Legal Department
- Accounting Office
- Personnel Office

== Transportation ==
The council building is accessible within walking distance of the Pingtung railway station.

== See also ==
- List of county magistrates of Pingtung
- Pingtung County Government
