= Green Island Nanliao Harbor =

Harbor in Lüdao, Taitung County, Taiwan

Green Island Nanliao Harbor 南寮碼頭
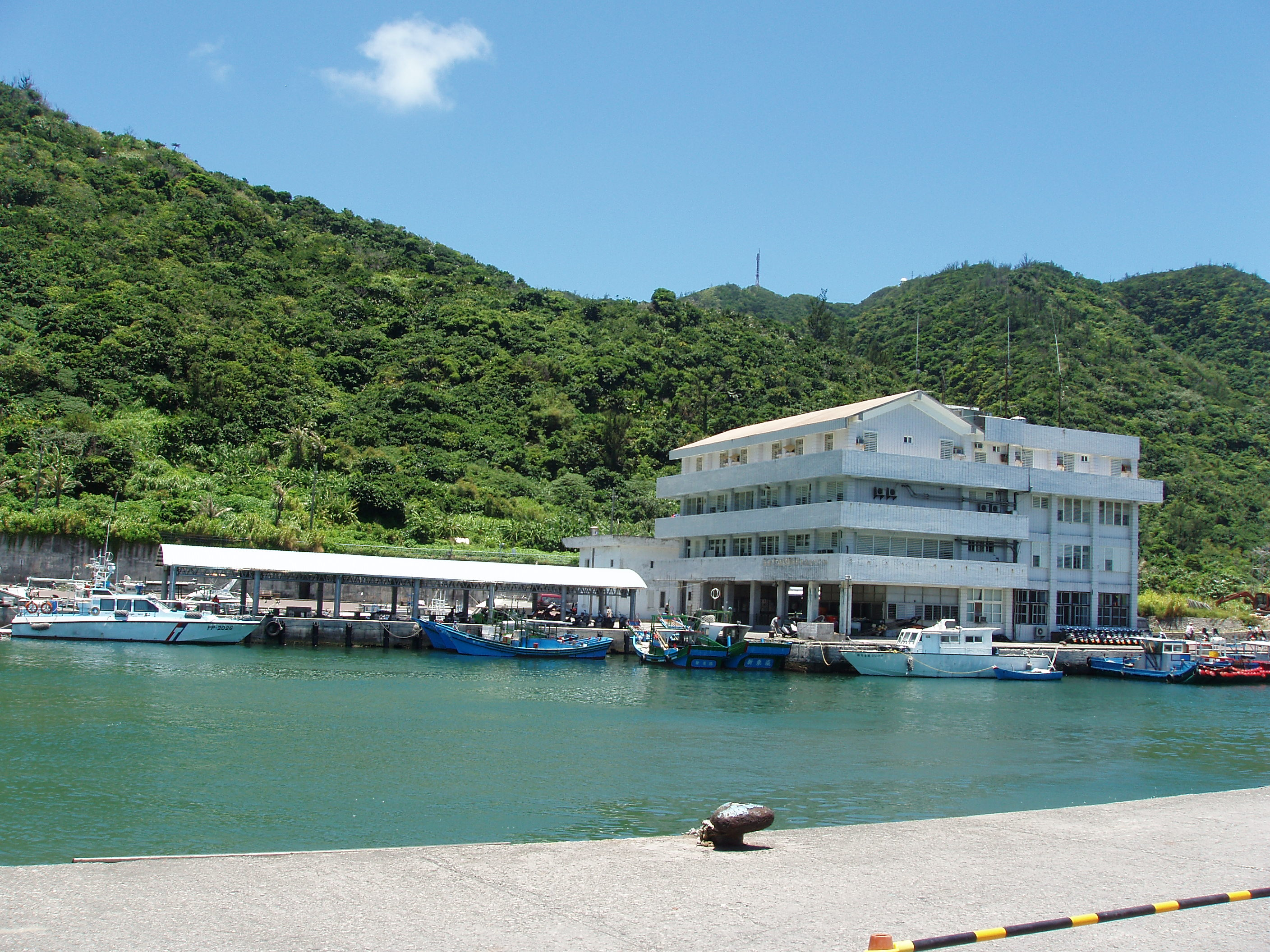
- Interactive map of Green Island Nanliao Harbor 南寮碼頭

Location
- Location: Lüdao, Taitung County, Taiwan
- Coordinates: 22°39′32.8″N 121°28′27.4″E

Details
- Type of harbour: fishing, passenger port

The Green Island Nanliao Harbor (traditional Chinese: 綠島南寮漁港; simplified Chinese: 绿岛南寮渔港; pinyin: Lǜdǎo Nánliáo Yúgǎng) is a passenger and fishing port in Green Island, Taitung County, Taiwan.

== Destinations ==
The port serves destinations to Fugang Harbor in Taitung City and Kaiyun Harbor in Orchid Island.
