= Datong Theater =

Former theater in Taitung City, Taitung County, Taiwan

- 大同戲院
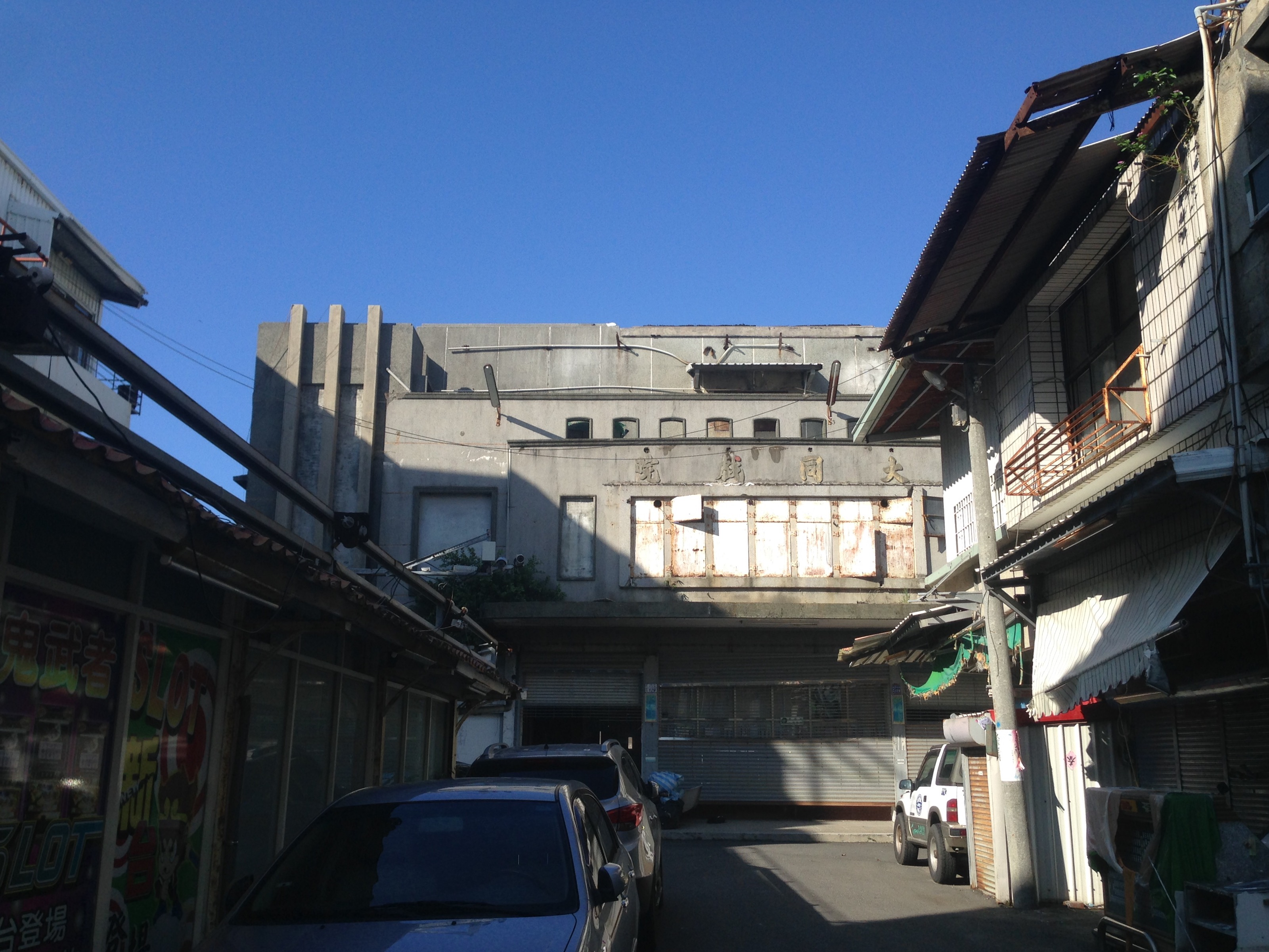
- Interactive map of Datong Theater
- Location: Taitung City, Taitung County, Taiwan
- Coordinates: 22°45′13.9″N 121°9′22.4″E
- Type: former theater

Construction
- Opened: 1956
- Demolished: 2009

The Datong Theater (traditional Chinese: 大同戲院; simplified Chinese: 大同戏院; pinyin: Dàtóng Xìyuàn) is a former movie theater in Datong Borough, Taitung City, Taitung County, Taiwan.

== History ==
The theater was opened in 1956 and became the entertainment center for the residents in the 1960s and 1970s. In the 1980s when televisions gained popularity among Taiwanese, many movie theaters closed down but Datong Theater remained in the business. However, fire destroyed the building on 17 August 2009 and subsequently the theater was closed. In 2018, the building was marked for demolition by Taitung County Government because of the danger it posed despite some opposition from local residents. Demolition works started on 2 December 2020.

== See also ==
- Cinema of Taiwan
