= Taitung Railway Art Village =

Art center in Taitung City, Taitung County, Taiwan

- 臺東鐵道藝術村
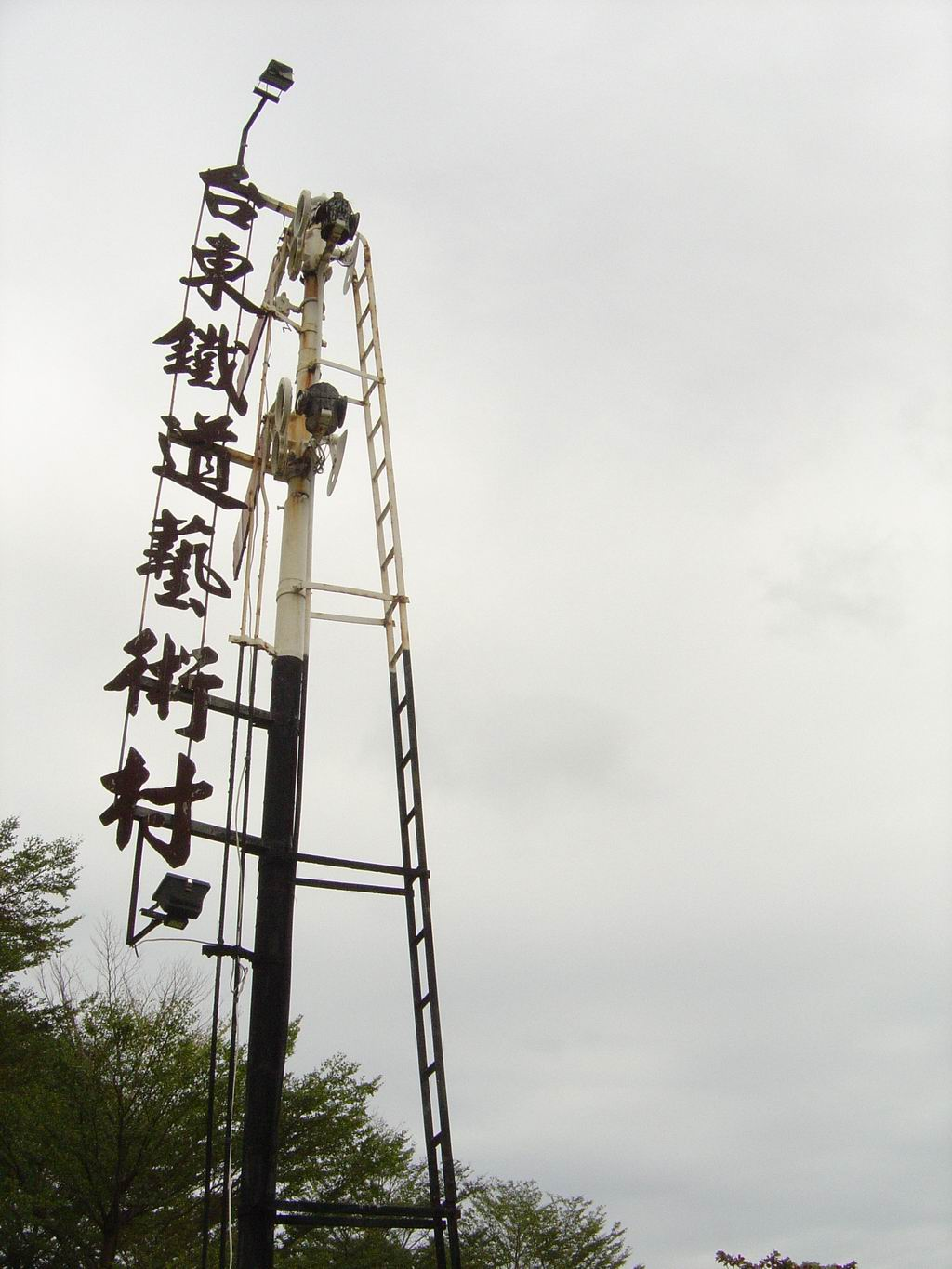
- Interactive map of Taitung Railway Art Village
- Location: Taitung City, Taitung County, Taiwan
- Coordinates: 22°45′12.1″N 121°08′45.5″E
- Type: arts center

The Taitung Railway Art Village (traditional Chinese: 臺東鐵道藝術村; simplified Chinese: 台东铁道艺术村; pinyin: Táidōng Tiědào Yìshù Cūn) is an art center in Taitung City, Taitung County, Taiwan.

== History ==
After the opening of the South Link line, the volume of passengers and freight became too large for the old Taitung Station to handle. The line connecting to the old Taitung Station was decommissioned in 2001. The new Taitung Station was then constructed and the old one was turned into an art center named Taitung Railway Art Village.

== Architecture ==
The art center consists of art studio, classroom, performance stage and Hualien Railway Culture Museum which were converted from the warehouses of the old station. The old station hall was converted into the information center of the art center.

== See also ==
- List of tourist attractions in Taiwan
