= Sleeping Beauty Rock =

Rock in Lüdao, Taitung County, Taiwan

Sleeping Beauty Rock 睡美人岩
- Sea stack
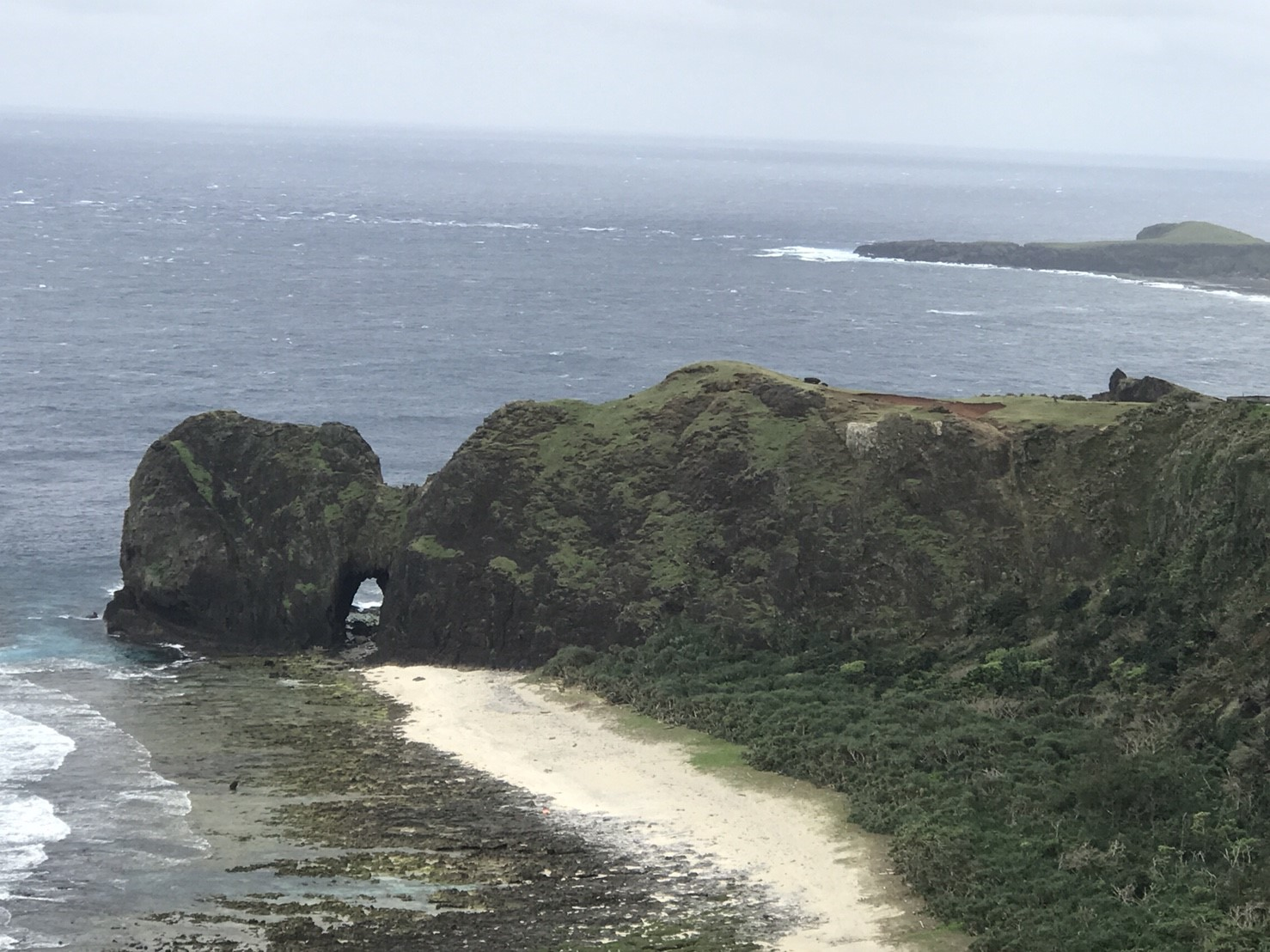

- Coordinates: 22°39′17″N 121°30′27″E
- Location: Lüdao, Taitung County, Taiwan
- Geology: rock

The Sleeping Beauty Rock (Chinese: 睡美人岩; pinyin: Shuì Měirén Yán) is a rock in Green Island, Taitung County, Taiwan.

== History ==
The rock is a residual volcanic wall. The rock was formed slowly after different parts of the crater eroded by sea and wind over time.

== Name ==
The rock was named Sleeping Beauty Rock because the shape resembles a Sleeping Beauty.

== See also ==
- Geology of Taiwan
