= Taitō Prefecture =

Administrative division of Taiwan during the Japanese rule

Taitō Prefecture 臺東廳
- Taitō-chō
- 1897-1952
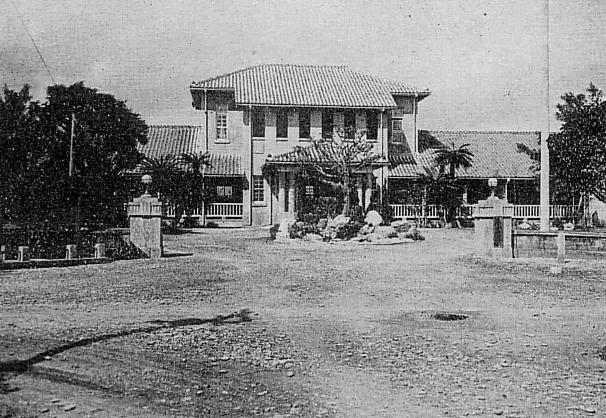
- The Taitō Prefecture government building
- Population
  - 1941: 93.138
- Historical era: Taiwan under Japanese rule
  - Established: 1897
  - Disestablished: 25 October 1945
  - Treaty of San Francisco: 28 April 1952
- Political subdivisions: 3 districts (郡)
- Today part of: Taitung County

Taitō Prefecture

Taitō Prefecture (臺東廳, Taitō-chō) was one of the administrative divisions of Taiwan during the Japanese rule. The prefecture consisted of modern-day Taitung County.

== Population ==
Total population	93,138
Japanese	7,078
Taiwanese	85,068
Korean	35
Other nationalities	957
1941 (Showa 16) census.

== Administrative divisions ==
=== Cities and Districts ===
Before its dissolution in 1945 (Shōwa 20), there were 3 districts in Taitō Prefecture.

Districts (郡 gun)
Name	Kanji	Kana
Taitō District	臺東郡	たいとうぐん
Kanzan District	關山郡	かんざんぐん
Shinkō District	新港郡	しんこうぐん

=== Towns and Villages ===
The districts are divided into towns (街) and villages (庄)

District	Name	Kanji	Notes
Taitō 臺東郡	Taitō town	臺東街	Today Taitung City and eastern Beinan Township
Taitō 臺東郡	Tamari village	太麻里庄	Today Taimali Township
Taitō 臺東郡	Daibu village	大武庄	Today Dawu Township
Taitō 臺東郡	Kashōtō village	火燒島庄	Today Lüdao Township
Taitō 臺東郡	Aboriginal Area	蕃地	Today Jinfeng Township, Lanyu Township, Daren Township and western Beinan Township
Taitō 臺東郡	Pinan village	卑南庄	Abolished in 1944, annexed into Taitō town.
Kanzan 關山郡	Kanzan town	關山街	Today Guanshan Township
Kanzan 關山郡	Ikegami village	池上庄	Today Chishang Township
Kanzan 關山郡	Shikano village	鹿野庄	Today Luye Township
Kanzan 關山郡	Aboriginal Area	蕃地	Today Yanping Township and Haiduan Township
Shinkō 新港郡	Shinkō town	新港街	Today Chenggong Township
Shinkō 新港郡	Nagahama village	長濱庄	Today Changbin Township
Shinkō 新港郡	Toran village	都蘭庄	Today Donghe Township

== See also ==
- Political divisions of Taiwan (1895-1945)
- Governor-General of Taiwan
- Taiwan under Japanese rule
- Administrative divisions of the Republic of China
