= Taitung Aboriginal Gallery =

Gallery in Taitung City, Taitung County, Taiwan

- 台東縣原住民文化創意產業聚落
- Location within Taitung County

General information
- Type: gallery
- Location: Taitung City, Taitung County, Taiwan
- Coordinates: 22°45′09.9″N 121°08′50.1″E
- Opened: 2016

Technical details
- Floor area: 1,921 m^{2}

Design and construction
- Architecture firm: Bio-architecture Formosana

Taitung Aboriginal Gallery
- Traditional Chinese: 台東縣原住民文化創意產業聚落
- Simplified Chinese: 台东县原住民文化创意产业聚落
Transcriptions
Standard Mandarin
- Hanyu Pinyin: Tāidōng Xiàn Yuánzhùmín Wénhuà Chuàngyì Chǎnyè Jùluò
- Wade–Giles: T‘ai^{2}-tung^{1} Hsien^{4} Yüan^{2}-chu^{4}-min^{2} Wen^{2}-hua^{4} Ch‘uang^{4}-i^{4} Ch‘an^{3}-yeh^{4} Chü^{4}-luo^{4}
Yue: Cantonese
- Yale Romanization: Tòihdūng Yuhn Yùhnjyuhmàhn Màhnfa Chongyi Cháanyihp Jeuihlohk
- Jyutping: toi4 dung1 jyun6 jyun4 zyu6 man4 man4 faa3 cong3 ji3 caan2 jip6 zeoi6 lok6

The Taitung Aboriginal Gallery (Chinese: 台東縣原住民文化創意產業聚落) is a gallery about Indigenous Peoples in Taitung City, Taitung County, Taiwan.

== History ==
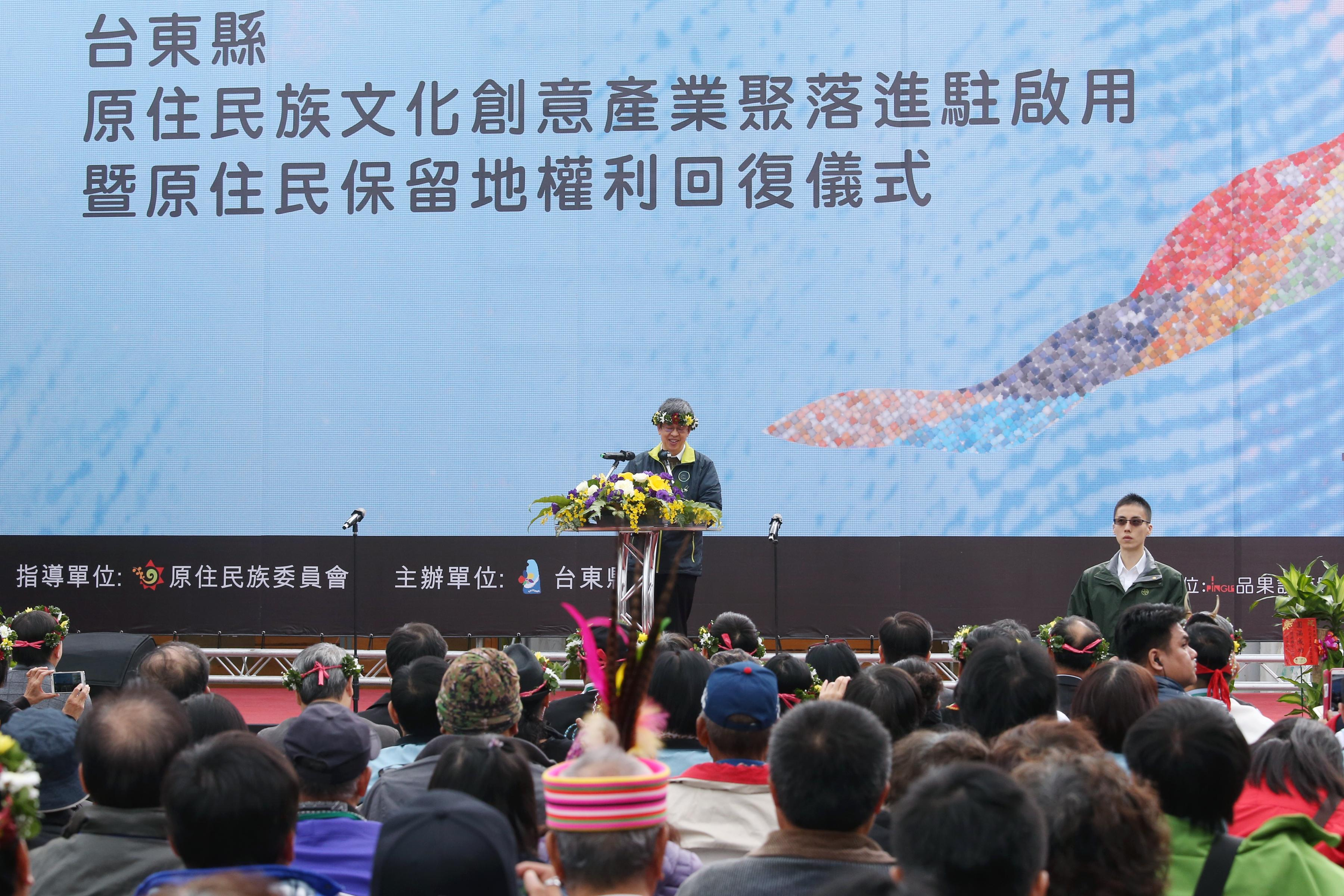
The opening ceremony of the gallery

The gallery was established in 2016.

== Architecture ==
The gallery was designed by Bio-architecture Formosana. It spans over an area of 1,921 m^{2}. The shape of its steel-framed roof resembles an ocean wave, corresponding to the fluctuating topography.

== See also ==
- List of tourist attractions in Taiwan
