= Taitung Art Museum =

Museum in Taitung City, Taitung County, Taiwan

- 台东美术馆
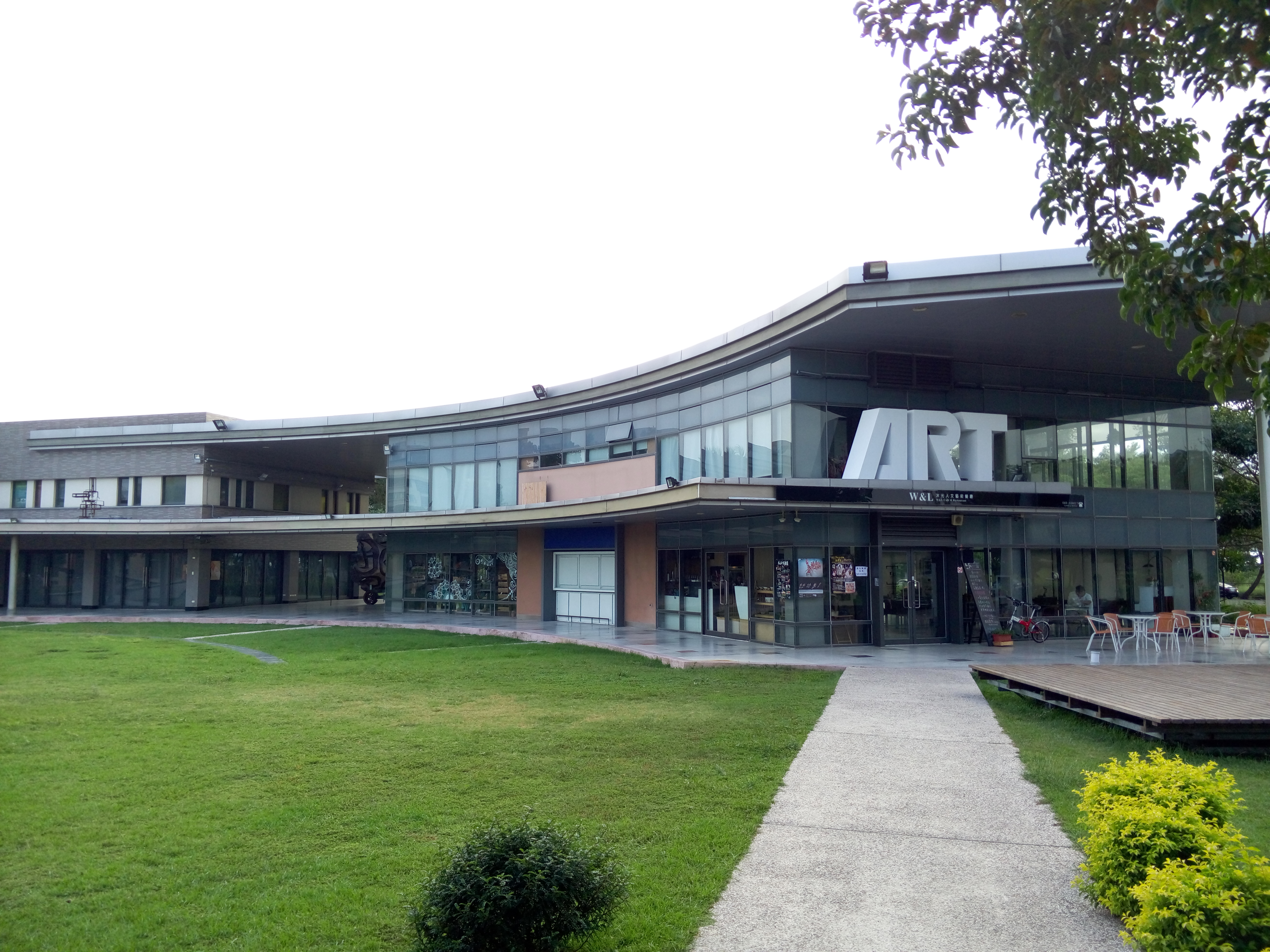
- Established: 15 December 2007
- Location: Taitung City, Taitung County, Taiwan
- Coordinates: 22°45′50.9364″N 121°8′59.3286″E
- Type: art museum
- Website: Official website (in Chinese)

The Taitung Art Museum (traditional Chinese: 台東美術館; simplified Chinese: 台东美术馆; pinyin: Táidōng Měishùguǎn) is an art museum located in Taitung City, Taitung County, Taiwan.

== History ==
The first stage of the museum building was opened on 15 December 2007. The second stage of the building was opened on 7 November 2009.

== Architecture ==
The museum spans over an area of 3.96 hectares. It is divided into two exhibition halls, which are Mountain Song Hall and Ocean Dance Hall.

== Transportation ==
The museum is accessible by bus from Taitung Station of the Taiwan Railway.

== See also ==
- List of museums in Taiwan
