= Taitung Performing Art Center =

Performance center in Taitung City, Taitung County, Taiwan

- 臺東表演藝術館
- Interactive map of Taitung Performing Art Center
- Location: Taitung City, Taitung County, Taiwan
- Coordinates: 22°45′34.8″N 121°08′19.7″E
- Type: performance center

Construction
- Opened: 2004

The Taitung Performing Art Center (traditional Chinese: 臺東表演藝術館; simplified Chinese: 台东表演艺术馆; pinyin: Táidōng Biǎoyǎn Yìshùguǎn) is a performance center in Taitung City, Taitung County, Taiwan.

== History ==
The center was established by Taitung Theater in 2004 as a venue for local artists showcasing their talents.

== See also ==
- List of tourist attractions in Taiwan
