= Moving Castle =

House in Taitung City, Taitung County, Taiwan

- 白色陋屋
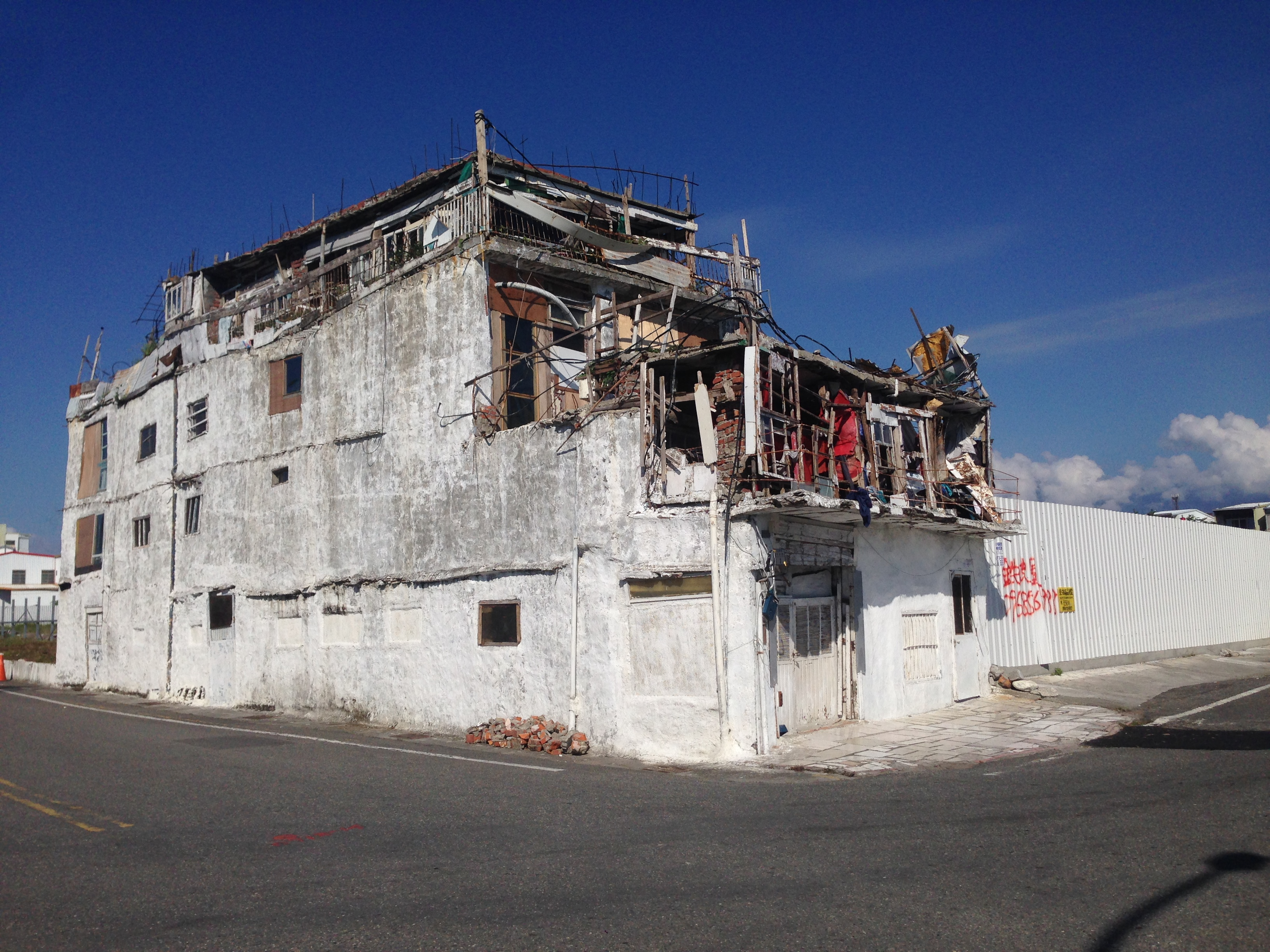
- Interactive map of the Moving Castle area

General information
- Type: house
- Location: Taitung City, Taitung County, Taiwan
- Coordinates: 22°45′4.5″N 121°9′32.3″E

Technical details
- Floor count: 4

The Moving Castle (Chinese: 白色陋屋; pinyin: Báisè Lòuwū; lit. 'White Hovel') is a house in Taitung City, Taitung County, Taiwan.

== History ==
The 4-story house was built by an owner surnamed Lee, who had served in the National Revolutionary Army and fled Mainland China for Taiwan after the end of the Chinese Civil War. He later served the Republic of China Armed Forces and was based in Tainan. His house was constructed over 30 years with materials left abandoned, such as wood, bricks and glass. In July 2016, the house was severely damaged by Typhoon Nepartak. Lee died in January 2017.

== Architecture ==
The house resembles the house featured in the Japanese movie Howl's Moving Castle. The owner used to live on the second floor and grew vegetables on the third floor.

== See also ==
- List of tourist attractions in Taiwan
