= Taitung Prefecture =

Historical administrative division in Taiwan

Taitung Prefecture (traditional Chinese: 臺東直隸州; simplified Chinese: 台东直隶州; Pe̍h-ōe-jī: Tâi-tang Ti̍t-lē-chiu) was a division of Taiwan Province, which was created after 1887 during Qing rule. The prefecture's seat of government, originally at Tsui-be (水尾; modern-day Ruisui, Hualien), was moved to Pi-lam (卑南; modern-day Taitung City) in 1888. The plan to establish the sub-prefectures of Pi-lam (卑南) and Hoe-lian-kang (花蓮港) was aborted.

In 1895, with the Treaty of Shimonoseki and the successful Japanese invasion of Taiwan, the prefecture was reorganized as Taitō Chō in 1897 under Japanese rule.

== See also ==
- Taiwan under Qing rule
- Taitō Prefecture
