= Taitung Chinese Association =

Buildings and structures in Taitung City, Taitung County, Taiwan

- 中華會館臺東分社
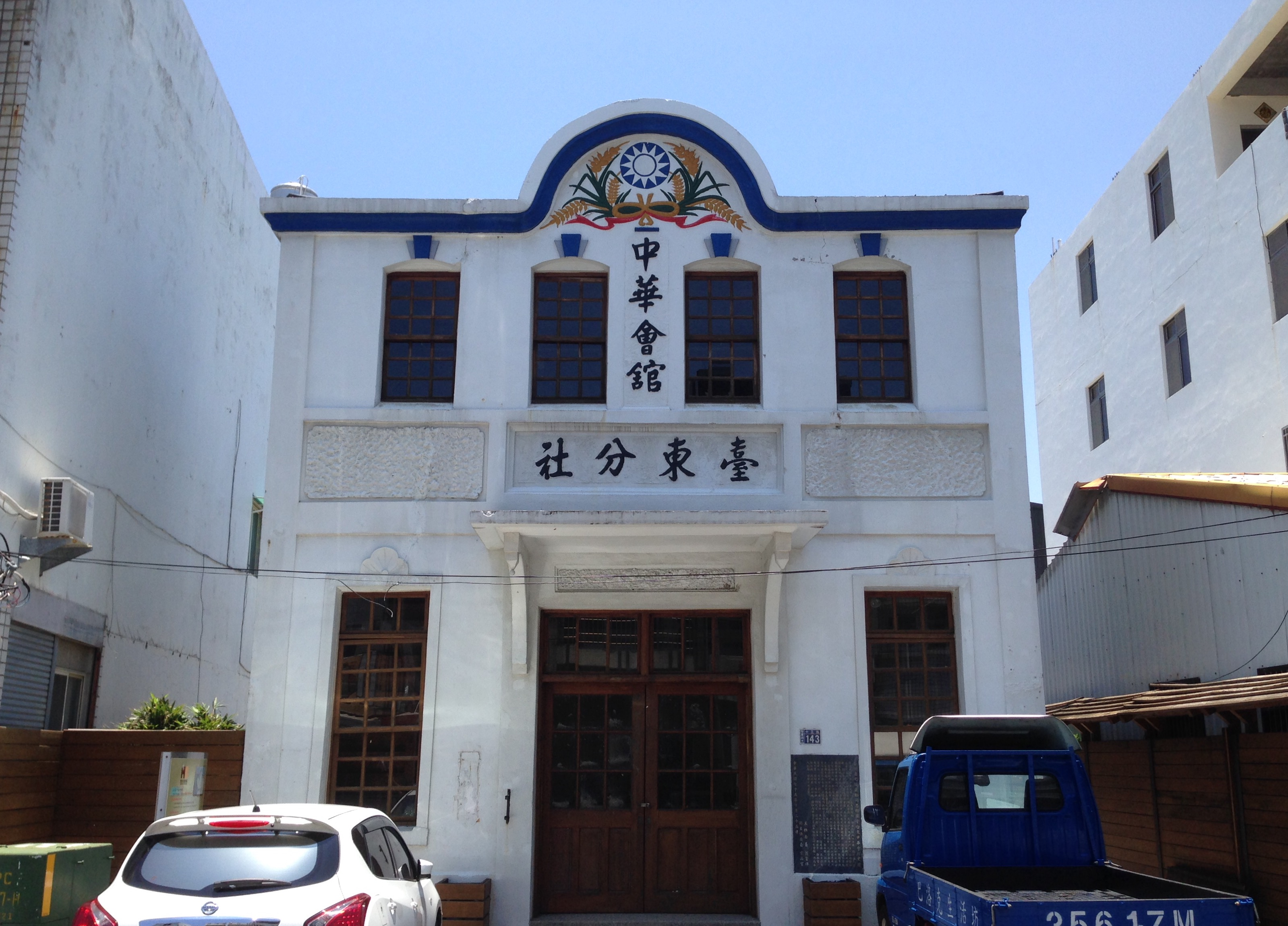
- Formation: 1927
- Headquarters: Taitung City, Taitung County, Taiwan
- Coordinates: 22°45′13.9″N 121°9′20.2″E

The Taitung Chinese Association (traditional Chinese: 中華會館臺東分社會; simplified Chinese: 中华会馆台东分社会; pinyin: Zhōnghuá Huìguǎn Táidōng Fēn Shèhuì) is an assembly hall in Taitung City, Taitung County, Taiwan.

== History ==
The association building was built in 1927 during the Japanese rule of Taiwan as the means for the Overseas Chinese to gather and assemble due to the fact that Taiwan was not part of China at that time. During the Second Sino-Japanese War in 1937, the Japanese government launched the Japanization towards the Chinese people in Taiwan, which also resulted in the eviction of the association from the building in 1938. In 1938-1945, the building was used by the Xinmin Society (Chinese: 中华民国新民会), a pro-Japanese organization based in Peking. After the handover of Taiwan from Japan to the Republic of China in 1945, the society was disbanded. The building was left unused until it was finally restored to its current condition and opened during the Retrocession Day commemoration in 1986.
