= National Taitung Junior College =

Junior college in Taitung City, Taitung County, Taiwan

- 國立臺東專科學校
- Type: public
- Established: 1928 (as Taitung Agricultural Extension School); 2006 (as NTC)
- Location: Taitung City, Taitung County, Taiwan; 22°45′25.1″N 121°07′20.4″E
- Website: Official website (in Chinese)

National Taitung Junior College
- Traditional Chinese: 國立臺東專科學校
Transcriptions
Standard Mandarin
- Hanyu Pinyin: Guólì Táidōng Zhuānkē Xuéxiào
Southern Min
- Hokkien POJ: Kok-li̍p Tâi-tang Choan-kho Ha̍k-hāu

National Taitung Junior College (NTC; Chinese: 國立臺東專科學校; Pe̍h-ōe-jī: Kok-li̍p Tâi-tang Choan-kho Ha̍k-hāu) is a public college located in Taitung City, Taitung County, Taiwan.

NTJC offers a variety of programs in different fields such as Tourism, Hospitality, Business Administration, Applied English, Information Management, and Early Childhood Education. The college has two schools, the School of Hospitality and Tourism and the School of Business Administration and Information Management, which offer a range of associate degree programs.

== History ==
NTC was founded as Taitung Agricultural Extension School in 1928. In 2006, the school changed its name to National Taitung Junior College.

== Faculties ==
=== Junior College ===
- Department of Horticulture
- Department of Hospitality Management
- Department of Architecture
- Department of Power Mechanical Engineering
- Department of Information Management
- Department of Food Science and Technology
- Department of Culture-Based Creative Design
- Department of Electrical Engineering

=== Senior Vocational High School ===
- Department of Electrical Engineering
- Department of Auto Mechanics
- Department of Interior Space Design
- Department of Architecture
- Department of Home Economics
- Department of Fowl and Livestock Health Care
- Department of Agricultural Machinery Engineering
- Department of Computer Engineering
- Department of Machinery

== See also ==
- List of universities in Taiwan
