= Sika Deer Ecological Park =

Zoo in Lüdao, Taitung County, Taiwan

Sika Deer Ecological Park 綠島梅花鹿生態園區
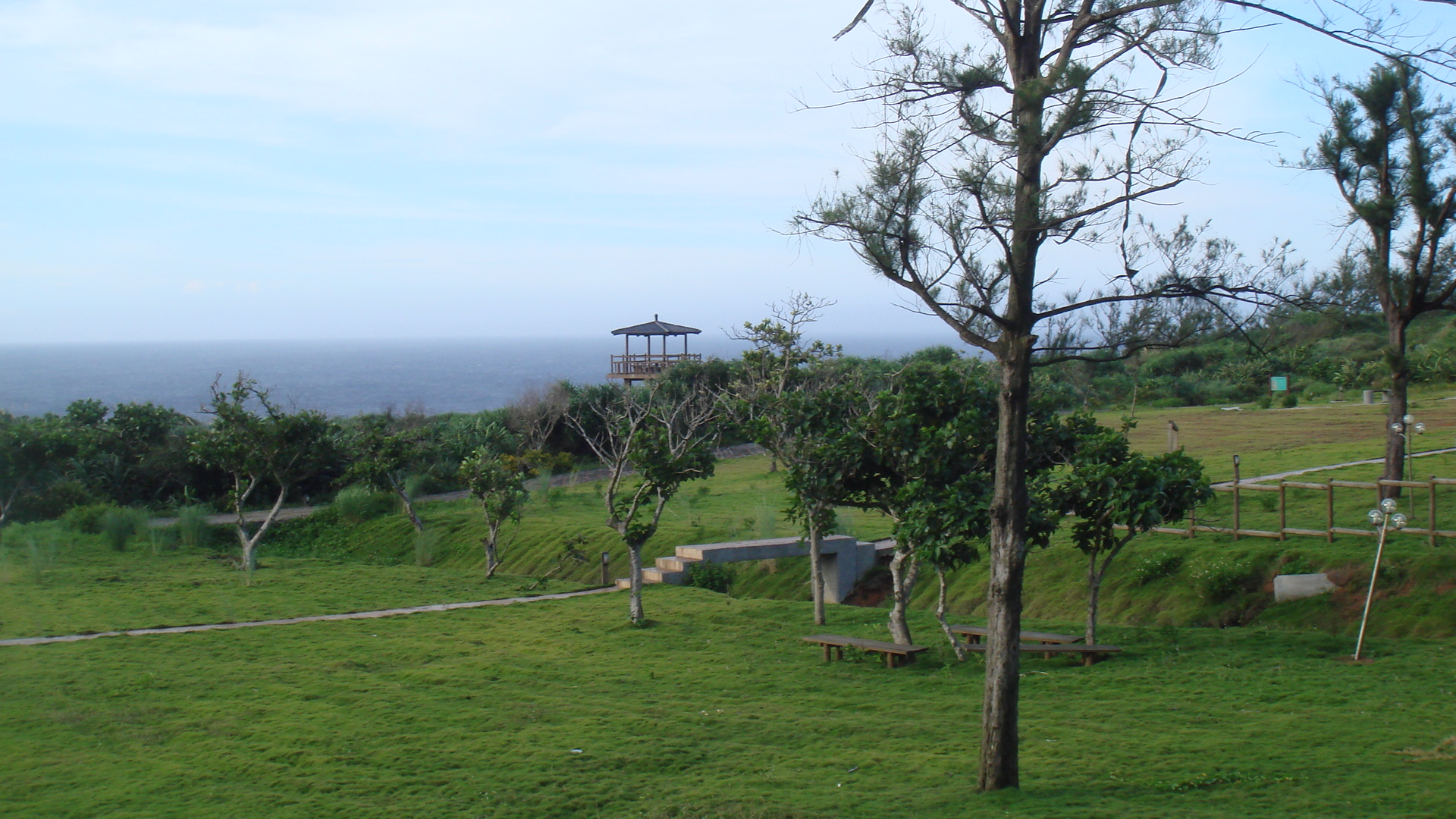
- Interactive map of Sika Deer Ecological Park 綠島梅花鹿生態園區
- 22°40′17.8″N 121°29′39.9″E
- Date opened: 2007
- Location: Lüdao, Taitung County, Taiwan

The Sika Deer Ecological Park (traditional Chinese: 綠島梅花鹿生態園區; simplified Chinese: 绿岛梅花鹿生态园区; pinyin: Lǜ Dǎo Méihuālù Shēngtài Yuánqū) is a zoo housing sika deer in Green Island, Taitung County, Taiwan.

== History ==
The growing of deer population in the island started in the 1970s. During its peak, the deer population outnumbered the population of the local people. After 1986, local residents started to release the deer into the wild. A zoo to be the captive place for those deer was established in 2007.

== Architecture ==
The zoo features a captivity area, information center, paintball area, shops and viewing platform.
