= Taitung Story Museum =

Museum in Taitung City, Taitung County, Taiwan

- 台東故事館
- Established: 2004
- Location: No. 478, Boai Road, Taitung City, Taitung County, Taiwan
- Coordinates: 22°45′42″N 121°09′10″E
- Type: museum
- Management: Eslite Co., Ltd.
- Public transit access: Yangmei Station

The Taitung Story Museum (traditional Chinese: 台東故事館; simplified Chinese: 台东故事馆; pinyin: Táidōng Gùshìguǎn) or Eslite Taitung Story Museum is a museum in Taitung City, Taitung County, Taiwan.

== History ==
The museum building was built on the site of the former Taitung Land Administration Office pursuant to a petition to the local government in 2004.

== Architecture ==
The building was designed with Japanese architecture.

== See also ==
- List of museums in Taiwan
