= Green Island, Taiwan =

Island and former penal colony in Taiwan

Green Island
Native name: Sanasai
- Satellite image of Green Island

- Map showing Green Island alongside Orchid and Lesser Orchid Islands.

Geography
- Location: Philippine Sea
- Coordinates: 22°40′00″N 121°28′59″E
- Area: 15.092 km^{2} (5.827 sq mi)
- Highest elevation: 281 m (922 ft)
- Highest point: Huoshao Mountain

Administration
- Republic of China
- Township: Lyudao
- County: Taitung
- Province: Taiwan (nominal)

Demographics
- Population: 4,321 (July 2026)
- Pop. density: 286/km^{2} (741/sq mi)
- Ethnic groups: Amis, Han

Green Island
- Lyudao Township in Taitung County
- Traditional Chinese: 綠島
- Simplified Chinese: 绿岛
- Hokkien POJ: Le̍k Tó
- Literal meaning: "Green Island"
Transcriptions
Standard Mandarin
- Hanyu Pinyin: Lǜ Dǎo
- Bopomofo: ㄌㄩˋ ㄉㄠˇ
- Gwoyeu Romatzyh: Liuh Dao
- Wade–Giles: Lü^{4} Tao^{3}
- Tongyong Pinyin: Lyù Dǎo
- Yale Romanization: Lyù Dǎu
- MPS2: Liù Dǎu
- IPA: [lŷ tàʊ]
Southern Min
- Hokkien POJ: Le̍k Tó
- Tâi-lô: Li̍k Tó

Bonfire Island
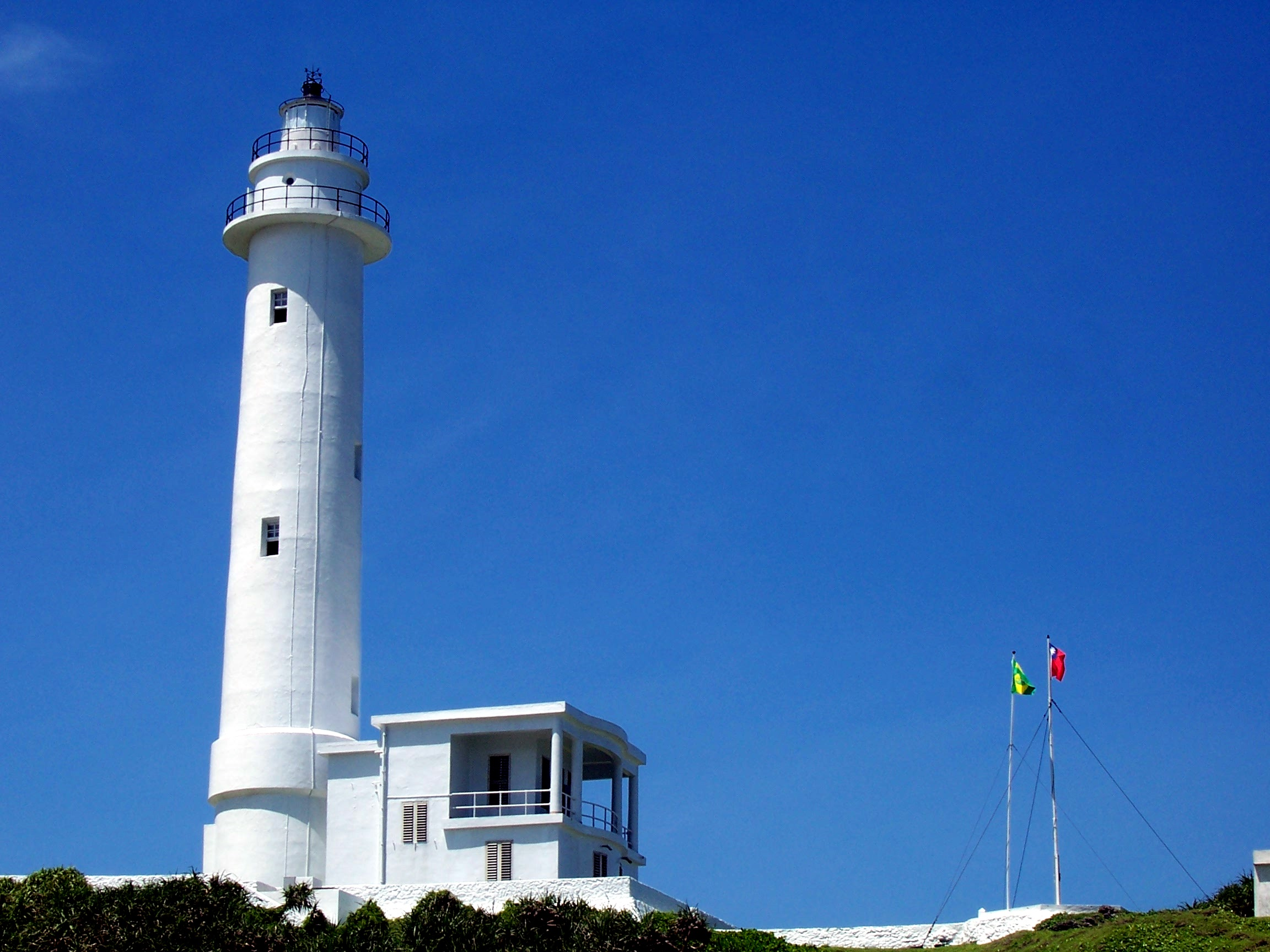
- Lüdao Lighthouse, east of the airport

Chinese name
- Traditional Chinese: 火燒島
- Simplified Chinese: 火烧岛
- Hokkien POJ: Hóe-sio Tó
- Literal meaning: "Fire-roasted Island"
Transcriptions
Standard Mandarin
- Hanyu Pinyin: Huǒshāo Dǎo
- Bopomofo: ㄏㄨㄛˇ ㄕㄠ ㄉㄠˇ
- Gwoyeu Romatzyh: Huooshau Dao
- Wade–Giles: Huo^{3}-shao^{1} Tao^{3}
- Tongyong Pinyin: Huǒshao Dǎo
- Yale Romanization: Hwǒshāu Dǎu
- MPS2: Huǒshāu Dǎu
- IPA: [xwò.ʂáʊ tàʊ]
Southern Min
- Hokkien POJ: Hóe-sio Tó
- Tâi-lô: Hué-sio Tó

Alternative Chinese name
- Traditional Chinese: 火燒嶼
- Simplified Chinese: 火烧屿
- Hokkien POJ: Hóe-sio-sū
- Literal meaning: "Fire-Roasted Islet"
Transcriptions
Standard Mandarin
- Hanyu Pinyin: Huǒshāo Yǔ
- Bopomofo: ㄏㄨㄛˇ ㄕㄠ ㄩˇ
- Gwoyeu Romatzyh: Huooshau Yeu
- Wade–Giles: Huo^{3}-shao^{1} Yü^{3}
- Tongyong Pinyin: Huǒshao Yǔ
- Yale Romanization: Hwǒshāu Yǔ
- MPS2: Huǒshāu Yǔ
- IPA: [xwò.ʂáʊ ỳ]
Southern Min
- Hokkien POJ: Hóe-sio-sū
- Tâi-lô: Hué-sio-sū

Japanese name
- Hiragana: かしょうとう
- Kyūjitai: 火燒島
- Shinjitai: 火焼島
Transcriptions
- Romanization: Kashō-tō

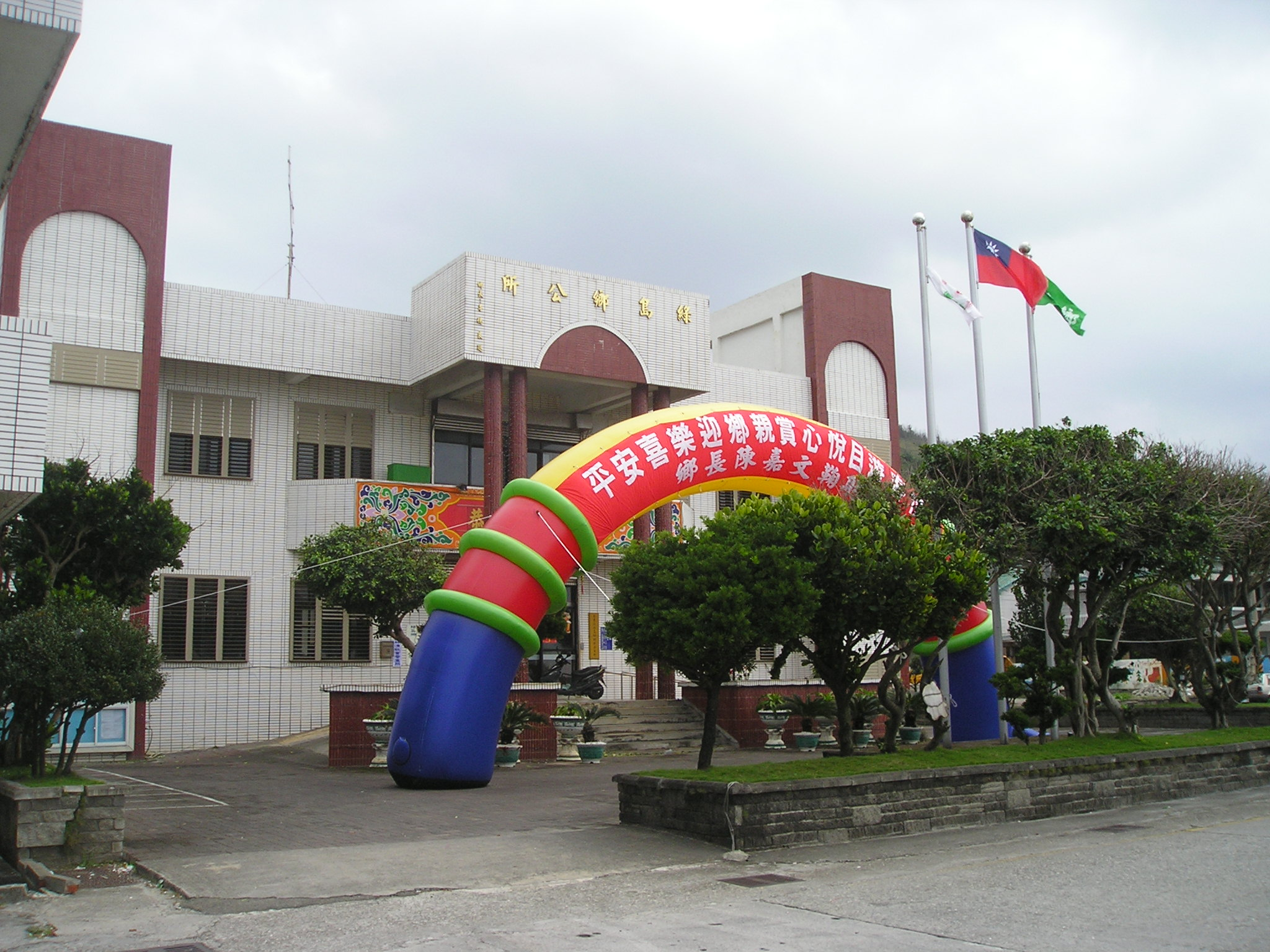
Lyudao Township Office

Green Island, also known by other names, is a small volcanic island in the Pacific Ocean about 33 km (21 mi) off the eastern coast of the main island of Taiwan. It is 15.092 km^{2} (5.83 sq mi) at high tide and 17.329 km^{2} (6.69 sq mi) at low tide, making it the seventh-largest island in Taiwan. The island is administered as Lyudao Township, a rural township of Taitung County and one of the county's two insular townships (the other being Lanyu Township). The island once served as a penal colony for political prisoners during Taiwan's period of martial law, although today it is primarily known as a tourist hotspot.

== Names ==
The island was known as Sama-Sana, Samasana and as Samasana Island in the 19th and early 20th centuries, a transcription of its Amis name Sanasai.

The name "Green Island" is a calque of the island's Chinese name, written in Traditional Chinese as 綠島. It is also known as Lyudao, Lüdao or Lü Dao from the pinyin romanization of the name's Mandarin pronunciation; as Lu Tao from its Wade-Giles romanization; and as Lek-to from its Hokkien pronunciation. The name was adopted by the Republic of China on August 1, 1949, at the behest of Huang Shih-hung (Chinese: 黃式鴻), the magistrate of Taitung.

Before that, it was usually known as Bonfire Island (or Huoshao), a calque of its original Chinese name Huǒshāo Dǎo (traditional Chinese: 火燒島; simplified Chinese: 火烧岛).

== History ==
The island was originally inhabited by the aboriginal Amis people.

In March 1864 the British brig Susan Douglas was swept off course and wrecked on the island. Her captain then sailed by junk from the island to Kaohsiung, and the Royal Navy gunboat HMS Bustard found and rescued the remainder of the survivors.

In the early 1870s, William Campbell saw the island from aboard the Daphne, and wrote:

We sighted also the Island of Samasana, which is thirty-four miles north of Botel Tobago, and fully fifteen miles east from the Formosan village of Po-song. Consul Swinhoe supposes that it is inhabited by fishermen of Luchuan origin; but Captain Belcher, of H.M.S. Samarang called there in 1845, and found the population to consist of about a hundred and fifty Chinese from the region of Amoy. They were then gathered into one village, and have greatly increased since that time.

On 11 December 1937 the Dollar Steamship Company luxury ocean liner SS President Hoover ran aground in a typhoon on a reef at Zhongliao Bay. All 503 passengers and 330 crew survived and were safely brought ashore. Over the next few days the cargo liners SS President McKinley and SS President Pierce took the survivors off the island, helped by boats provided by the Japanese cruiser Ashigara and an Imperial Japanese Navy destroyer. Dollar Lines sold President Hoover's wreck to a Japanese salvage company, which spent the next three years breaking her up in situ.

In response to the wreck, members of the US public gave money through the American Red Cross for a lighthouse to be built near Zhongliao village. Lyudao or Lüdao Lighthouse was designed by Japanese engineers, built by local islanders in 1938 and is 33.3 metres (109 ft) high.

A shipwreck of Dutch origin dating to the 19th century was found in June 2013.

=== Prisons ===
Green Island first served as an isolated spot and place of exile for political prisoners during the martial law period during the Kuomintang government, and especially in the White Terror. After their release, many of the prisoners jailed between the late 1940s and the late 1980s went on to establish the Democratic Progressive Party, most notably Shih Ming-teh. Writer and political dissident Bo Yang served his prison terms there.

During the 1950s, while National Taiwan University Hospital physicians Hu Hsin-lin, Hu Pao-chen, and Su You-peng were held at Green Island, they established a clinic alongside others who had medical training, including Lin En-kui, to treat other inmates, prison guards, and Green Island residents. As prisoners with medical backgrounds were released, the clinic shrank, then closed in 1960 with the departure of Hu Hsin-lin.

The place where most of the political prisoners (such as Shih Ming-teh) were held was "Green Island Lodge" (pinyin: Lǜ Dǎo Shānzhuāng). "Oasis Village" was the main penal colony. The prison was later closed, and its interior is now open to the public. "Green Island Prison" (pinyin: Lǜdǎo Jiānyù) is also on the island and has housed prisoners considered to be among Taiwan's most dangerous criminals and gangsters. However, this has changed in recent years.

== Geography ==
The island is formed of volcanic tholeiite, andesite, and volcanic explosive fragments with an area of 15 km^{2}. The volcano erupted from the Pliocene to Pleistocene epochs and is part of the Luzon Volcanic Arc. Magma was formed by subduction of oceanic crust at a depth of about 25 kilometres (16 mi). The andesite rock contains some visible crystals of pyroxene or amphibole. The geochemistry of the rock shows it is enriched in potassium, strontium and rubidium and light rare earth elements. Chromium and nickel are depleted.

=== Fauna ===
The island is a habitat for Formosan sika deer, Reeves's muntjacs, Ryukyu flying foxes, and resident and migratory birds.

== Local population ==
In 1995 fewer than half of the registered 2,634 residents of the island actually lived on the island. The population is dwindling due to the difficulty of finding jobs on the island. The island has two pre-schools, one kindergarten, two elementary schools and one middle school. To pursue any education at the senior high school level or above, islanders must move to the main island of Taiwan. Public service centres include one seniors' home, one library, and one community centre.

The villages and the settlements (聚落) they administer are:

- Zhongliao Village (中寮村)
  - Zhongliao
- Nanliao Village (南寮村)
  - Nanliao (南寮)
  - Yugang (漁港)
- Gongguan Village (公館村)
  - Gongguan (公館)
  - Chaikou (柴口)
  - Liumagou (流麻溝)
  - Dahu (大湖)
  - Zuoping (左坪)

The following abandoned aboriginal tribal settlements also belong to Gongguan Village:

- Youzihu (柚子湖)
- Nanzihu (楠子湖)
- Haishenping (海參坪)
- Dabaisha (大白沙)

== Power generation ==
The island is powered by its only diesel-fired power plant with a capacity of 29.1 MW, consisting of 28 units of generation.

== Tourist attractions ==
- Green Island Human Rights Culture Park
- Lüdao Lighthouse
- Green Island Dive Sites Recreational diving is popular for visitors. There are many dive sites that are established with walkways down to ocean About 150 meter Off Shilang, lies the biggest reef attraction 'Big Mushroom Coral' its height about 12m, width around 31m.
- Sika Deer Ecological Park
- Sleeping Beauty Rock
- Zhaori Hot Spring Sea water heated from the volcanic action rises to the surface next to coral reefs at 53 °C and pH7.5.

== Transportation ==
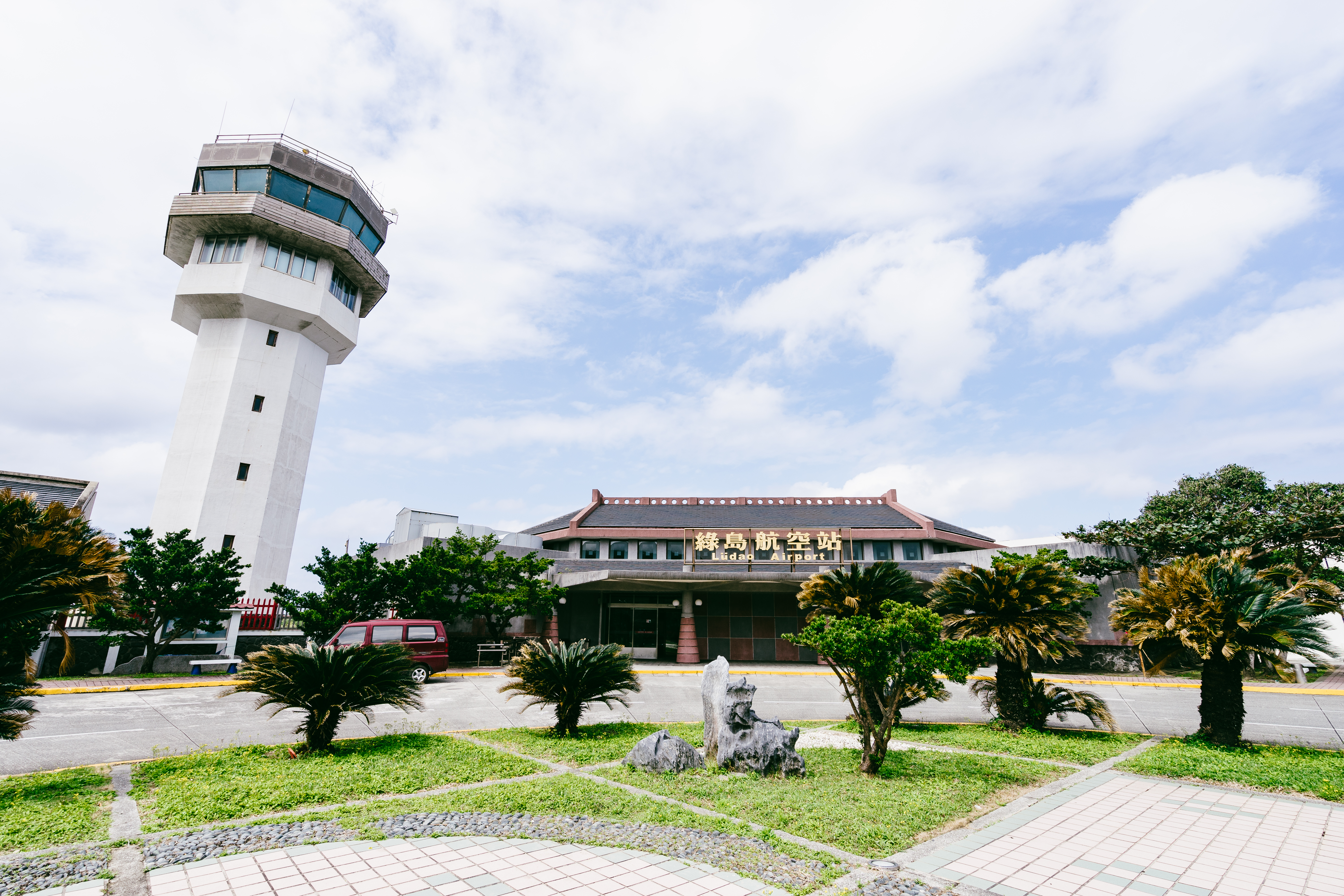
Lüdao Airport

Lüdao Airport provides flights to Taitung Airport in Taitung City. There are also ferries travelling from Nanliao Harbor to Fugang Fishery Harbor in Taitung City.

== Books ==
Green island is a subject in the following book:

- Green Island (novel) by Shawna Yang Ryan

== See also ==
- List of islands of Taiwan
- List of islands in the East China Sea
