= Fugang Fishery Harbor =

Harbor in Taitung City, Taitung County, Taiwan

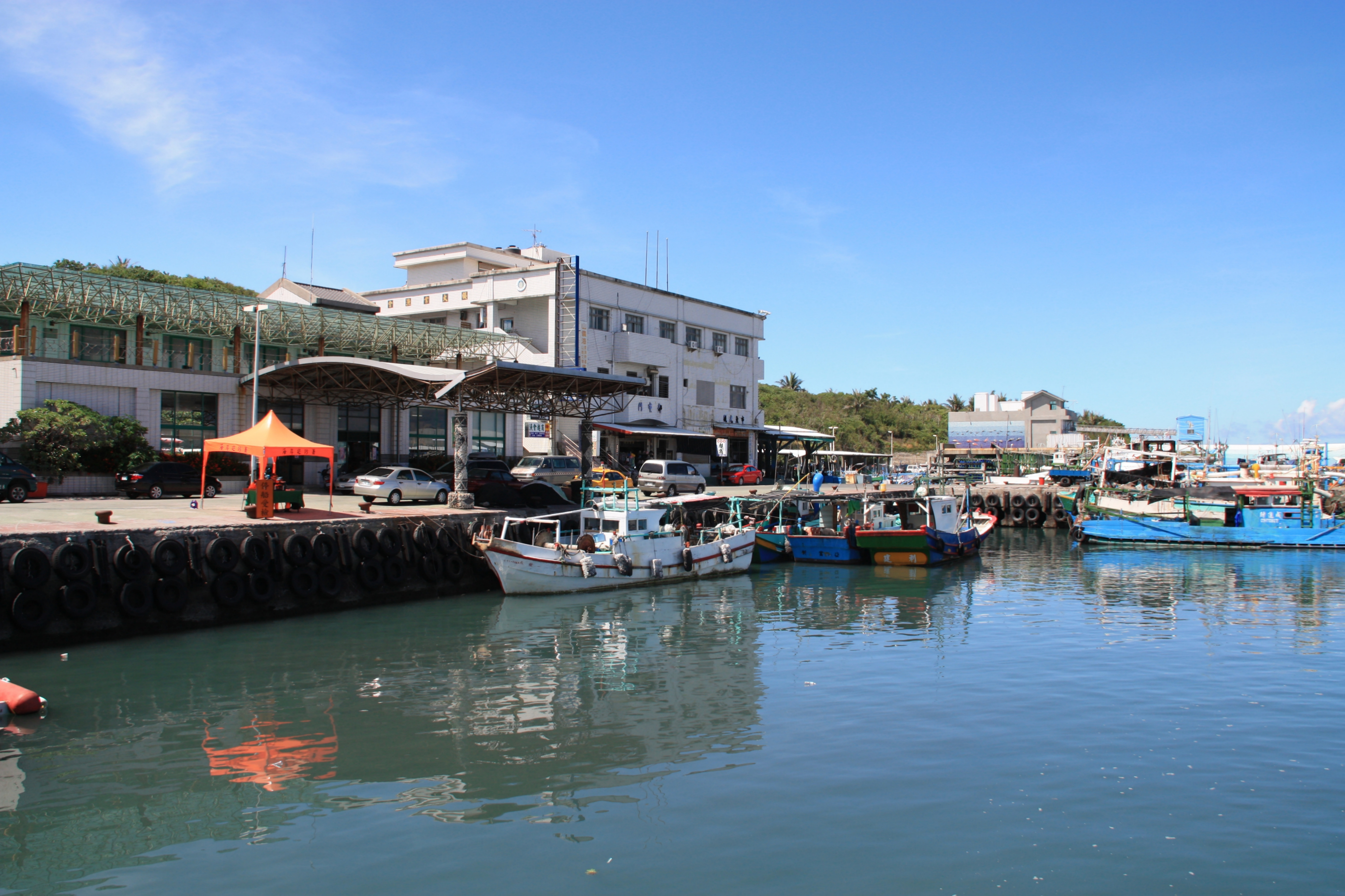
- Interactive map of Fugang Fishery Harbor
- Location within Taiwan
- Native name: 富岡漁港

Location
- Location: Taitung City, Taitung County, Taiwan
- Coordinates: 22°47′30″N 121°11′31.4″E

Details
- Type of Harbor: fishing port

The Fugang Fishery Harbor (traditional Chinese: 富岡漁港; simplified Chinese: 富冈渔港; pinyin: Fùgāng Yúgǎng) is a harbor in Taitung City, Taitung County, Taiwan.

== Geography ==
The harbor is located at Beinan Creek.

== Economy ==
The harbor is the portal for sea fishing and acts as a tourist fish market.

== Destinations ==
Through its jetties, it serves as the gateway access to Taiwan offshore islands:

- Green Island at Nanliao Harbor
- Orchid Island at Kaiyun Harbor

== Transportation ==
The harbor is accessible by shuttle service, bus, or taxi from Taitung Station.

== See also ==
- Taitung City
