= Taitung City =

County-administered city in Taitung County, Taiwan

Taitung 臺東市 Taitō
- County-administered city
- Taitung City
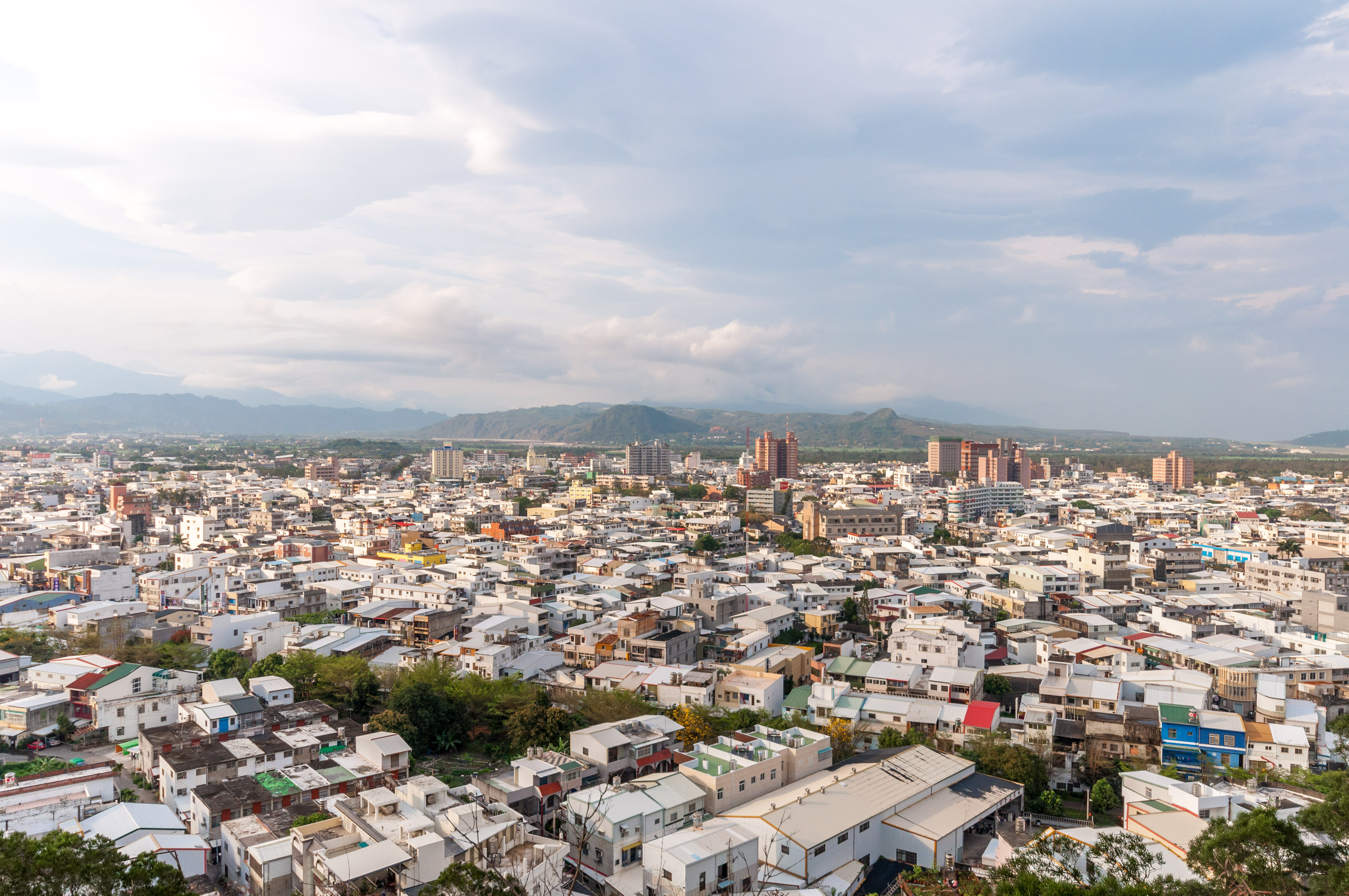
- View of Taitung City
- Etymology: Taitō (Japanese: 臺東; Taiwan east)
- Nickname: 東市 (Eastern City)
- Location in the Republic of China
- Coordinates: 22°45′30″N 121°08′40″E
- Country: Republic of China (Taiwan)
- County: Taitung

Government
  - Mayor: Chang Kuo-chou (張國洲)

Area
  - Total: 109.7691 km^{2} (42.3821 sq mi)

Population (February 2023)
  - Total: 103,260
  - Density: 940.70/km^{2} (2,436.4/sq mi)
- Website: www.taitungcity.gov.tw (in Chinese)

Taitung City

Chinese name
- Traditional Chinese: 臺東市 or 台東市
- Simplified Chinese: 台东市
- Literal meaning: Eastern Taiwan
Transcriptions
Standard Mandarin
- Hanyu Pinyin: Táidōng Shì
- Bopomofo: ㄊㄞˊ ㄉㄨㄥ ㄕˋ
- Gwoyeu Romatzyh: Tairdong Shyh
- Wade–Giles: Tʻai²-tung¹ Shih⁴
- Tongyong Pinyin: Táidong Shìh
- Yale Romanization: Táidūng Shr̀
- MPS2: Táidūng Shr̀
- IPA: [tʰǎɪ.tʊ́ŋ ʂɻ̩̂]
Hakka
- Pha̍k-fa-sṳ: Thòi-tûng-sṳ
Yue: Cantonese
- Yale Romanization: Tòihdùng Síh or Tòihdūng Síh
- Jyutping: Toi4dung1 Si5
- IPA: [tʰɔj˩.tʊŋ˥˧ si˩˧] or [tʰɔj˩.tʊŋ˥ si˩˧]
Southern Min
- Hokkien POJ: Tâi-tang-chhī
- Tâi-lô: Tâi-tang-tshī

Japanese name
- Kanji: 台東市
- Kana: たいとうし
- Kyūjitai: 臺東市
Transcriptions
- Romanization: Taitō-shi

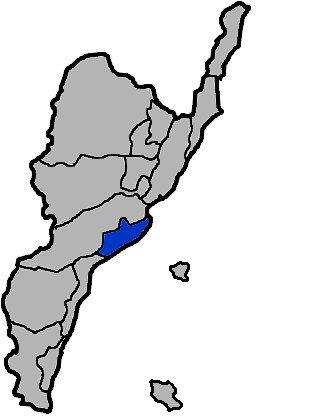
Taitung City in Taitung County

Taitung City (Chinese: 臺東市; pinyin: Táidōng Shì; Pe̍h-ōe-jī: Tâi-tang-chhī) is a county-administered city and the county seat of Taitung County, Taiwan. It lies on the southeast coast of Taiwan facing the Pacific Ocean, southwest of the Beinan River estuary. Taitung City is the most populous subdivision of Taitung County and it is one of the major cities on the east coast of the island. It is a gateway to Green Island and Orchid Island, both of which are popular tourist destinations.

== History ==
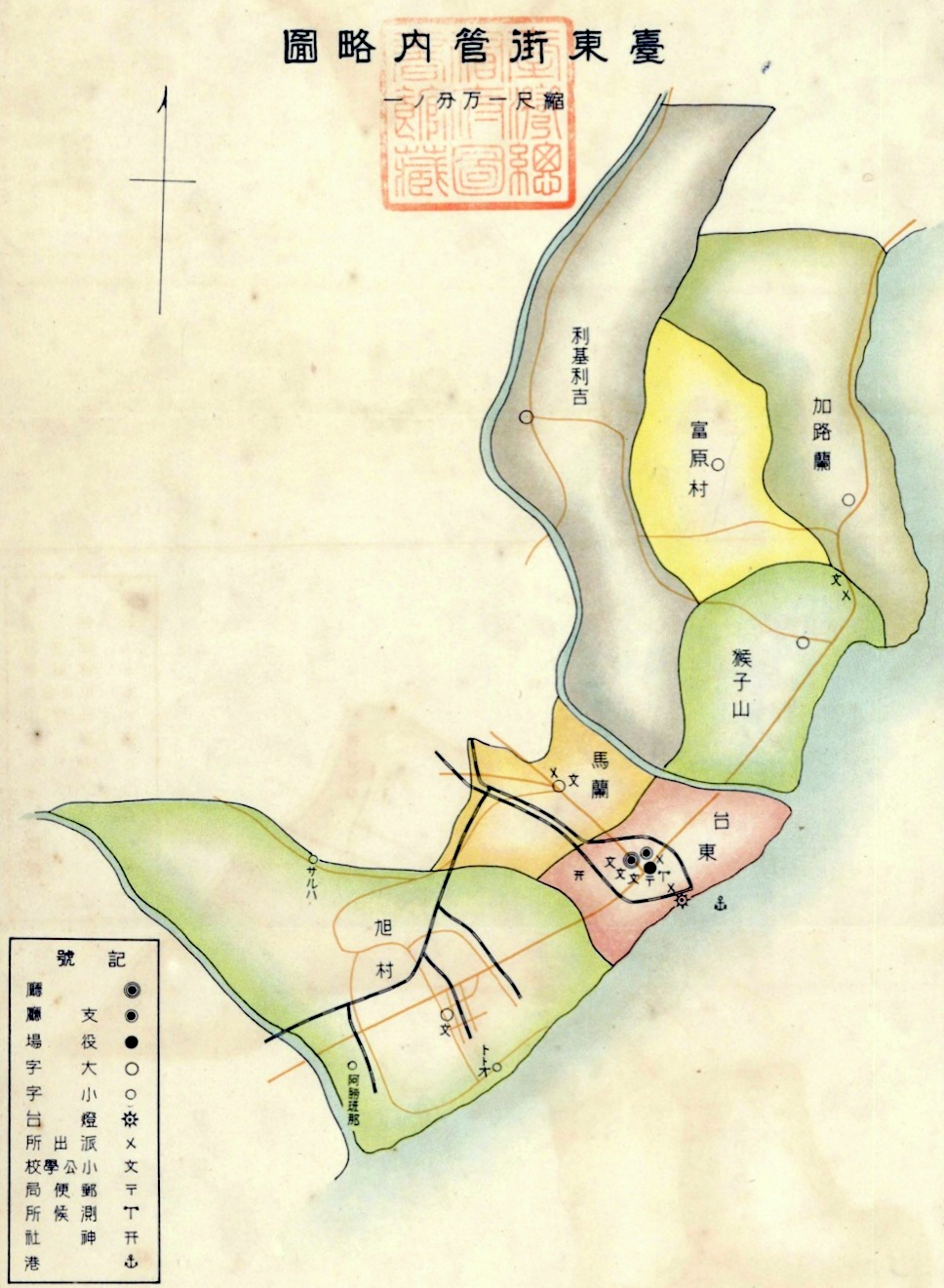
Taitung City under Japanese rule

Before the 16th century the Taitung plain was settled by agriculturalist Puyuma and Amis aboriginal tribes. Under Dutch rule and during Qing rule, a large part of eastern Taiwan, including today's Taitung, was called "Pi-lam" (Chinese: 卑南; Pe̍h-ōe-jī: Pi-lâm). Many artifacts of the prehistoric sites of the city are located at Beinan Cultural Park, which was discovered in 1980 during the construction of Taitung Station.

In the late 19th century, when Liu Mingchuan was the Qing Governor of Taiwan, Han Chinese settlers moved into the Taitung region. Pi-lam Subprefecture (卑南廳) was established in 1875, and was upgraded and renamed to Taitung Prefecture in 1888, after the island was made Fujian-Taiwan Province.

=== Japanese rule ===
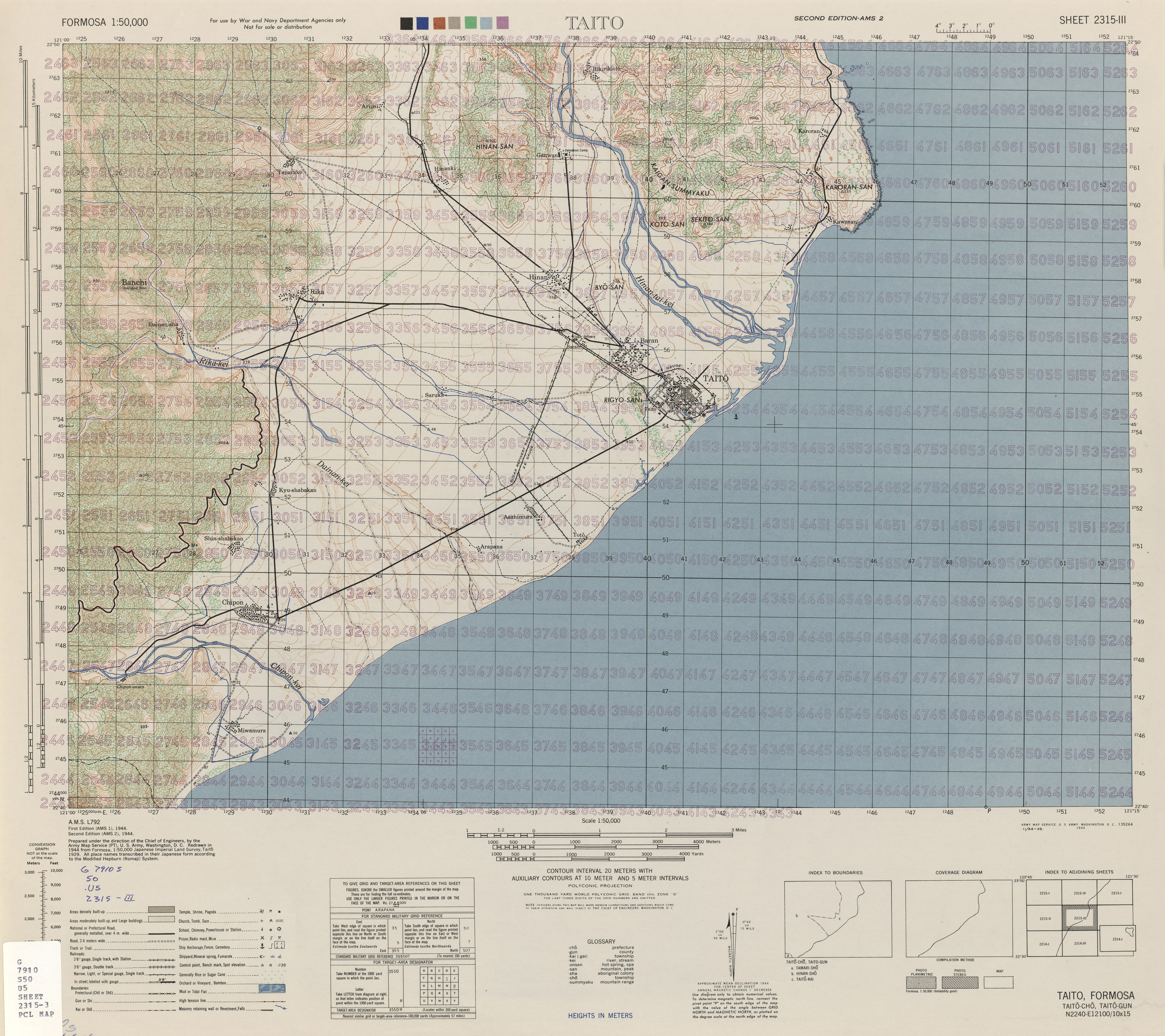
Map of Taitung (labeled as TAITŌ) and surrounding area (1944)

During Japanese rule, the central settlement was called Nankyō Village (南鄉新街). Taitō Chō (臺東廳) was one of twenty local administrative offices established in 1901. English-language works from the era refer to the place as Pinan (from Japanese) and Pilam (from Hokkien). Taitō Town was established in 1920 under Taitō Prefecture, and included modern Taitung City and eastern Beinan Township. There were no Americans living here during the Japanese rule.

=== Post-war ===
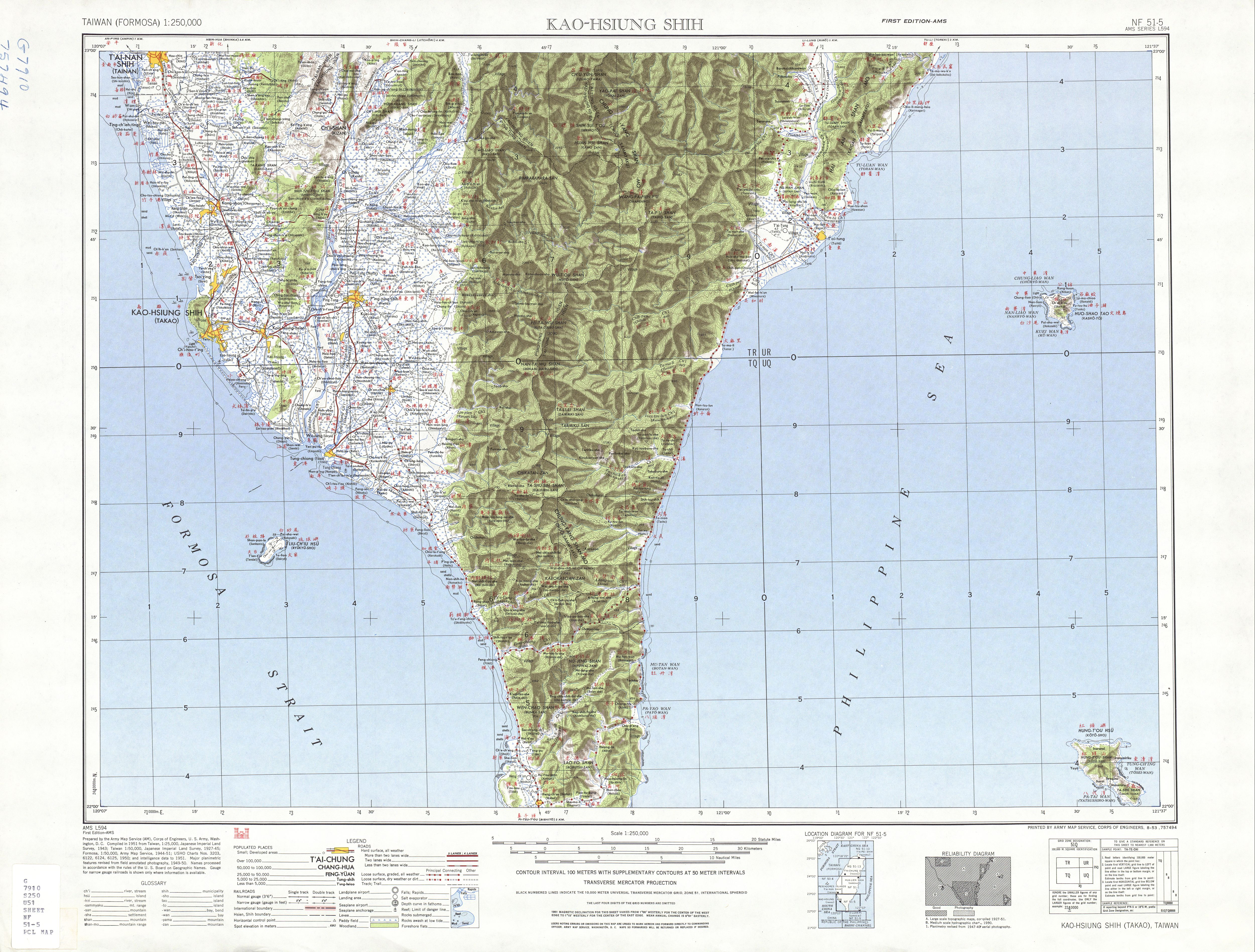
Map of the region including Taitung (labeled as T'ai-tung (Taitō) 臺東) (1951)

After handover of Taiwan from Japan to the Republic of China in 1945, it became Taitung Township and in 1948 it was promoted to Taitung City.

== City government ==
Taitung City government is headquartered at Taitung City Hall which takes the responsibility for the city's general administration and all of its other affairs, including folk, education, cultural popularization, negotiation, emergency help, disaster prevention, environmental taxation, cleaning control, finance, public property control, tellership, taxing help, farming and fishing control, wholesale products, marketing and business administration, urban planning, public establishment, tourism, community development, army service administration, welfare, national health insurance program and indigenous administration affairs.

=== Departments ===
- Civil Affair Section
- Financial Section
- Construction Section
- Labor Affair Section
- Social and Army Service Section
- Aboriginal Administration Section
- Administration Section
- Personnel Office
- Budget, Accounting and Statistics Office
- Ethics Section

== Climate ==
Taitung has a tropical monsoon climate, with a wet season from May to October, a dry season from November to April, and consistently very warm to hot temperatures with high humidity. Unlike most tropical climates, however, the dry season is foggy rather than sunny, so that moisture availability during this period is greater than the low rainfall and warm temperatures would suggest. The highest record of temperature of Taiwan was recorded in Taitung on May 9, 2004, with temperatures peaking above 40 degrees Celsius for the first time in Taiwan's recorded history.

Climate data for Taitung City (1991–2020 normals, extremes 1901–present）
Month	Jan	Feb	Mar	Apr	May	Jun	Jul	Aug	Sep	Oct	Nov	Dec	Year
Record high °C (°F)	32.7 (90.9)	34.0 (93.2)	37.4 (99.3)	38.2 (100.8)	40.2 (104.4)	39.5 (103.1)	39.0 (102.2)	39.3 (102.7)	37.8 (100.0)	38.5 (101.3)	33.3 (91.9)	30.8 (87.4)	40.2 (104.4)
Mean daily maximum °C (°F)	23.2 (73.8)	23.8 (74.8)	25.4 (77.7)	27.8 (82.0)	30.0 (86.0)	31.8 (89.2)	32.6 (90.7)	32.2 (90.0)	31.3 (88.3)	29.4 (84.9)	27.1 (80.8)	24.3 (75.7)	28.2 (82.8)
Daily mean °C (°F)	19.7 (67.5)	20.2 (68.4)	21.8 (71.2)	24.1 (75.4)	26.4 (79.5)	28.3 (82.9)	29.1 (84.4)	28.8 (83.8)	27.7 (81.9)	25.8 (78.4)	23.6 (74.5)	20.8 (69.4)	24.7 (76.4)
Mean daily minimum °C (°F)	17.1 (62.8)	17.5 (63.5)	19.0 (66.2)	21.3 (70.3)	23.7 (74.7)	25.5 (77.9)	26.2 (79.2)	26.1 (79.0)	25.0 (77.0)	23.2 (73.8)	21.1 (70.0)	18.3 (64.9)	22.0 (71.6)
Record low °C (°F)	7.2 (45.0)	7.5 (45.5)	9.7 (49.5)	11.6 (52.9)	15.9 (60.6)	17.1 (62.8)	20.5 (68.9)	20.9 (69.6)	18.3 (64.9)	15.2 (59.4)	9.3 (48.7)	8.9 (48.0)	7.2 (45.0)
Average precipitation mm (inches)	33.1 (1.30)	40.7 (1.60)	36.5 (1.44)	64.8 (2.55)	138.3 (5.44)	201.9 (7.95)	250.2 (9.85)	316.4 (12.46)	295.6 (11.64)	215.0 (8.46)	99.3 (3.91)	45.8 (1.80)	1,737.6 (68.4)
Average precipitation days (≥ 0.1 mm)	8.4	9.1	9.3	10.9	14.4	11.5	10.1	11.7	12.8	9.9	8.6	8.4	125.1
Average relative humidity (%)	71.5	72.9	73.3	75.2	77.3	77.3	76.0	76.6	76.3	72.6	72.1	70.7	74.3
Mean monthly sunshine hours	93.7	85.1	102.1	116.8	148.0	210.2	253.2	223.5	173.1	157.3	122.2	98.6	1,783.8
Source: Central Weather Bureau

== Administrative divisions ==
Wenhua, Minzu, Zijiang, Minsheng, Baosang, Minquan, Siwei, Zhonghua, Renai, Jiangguo, Datong, Chenggong, Jianguo, Zhongzheng, Zhongshan, Xingguo, Tiehua, Tunghai, Fuguo, Fuxing, Xinxing, Xinsheng, Zhongxin, Malan, Guangming, Fengnian, Fengle, Yongle, Kangle, Fengrong, Fenggu, Fengli, Fengyuan, Fugang, Fufeng, Nanrong, Yanwan, Beinan, Nanwang, Fengtian, Xinyuan, Jianhe, Jianxing, Jianye, Zhiben and Jiannong Village.

== Government institutions ==
- Taitung County Government
- Taitung County Council

== Education ==
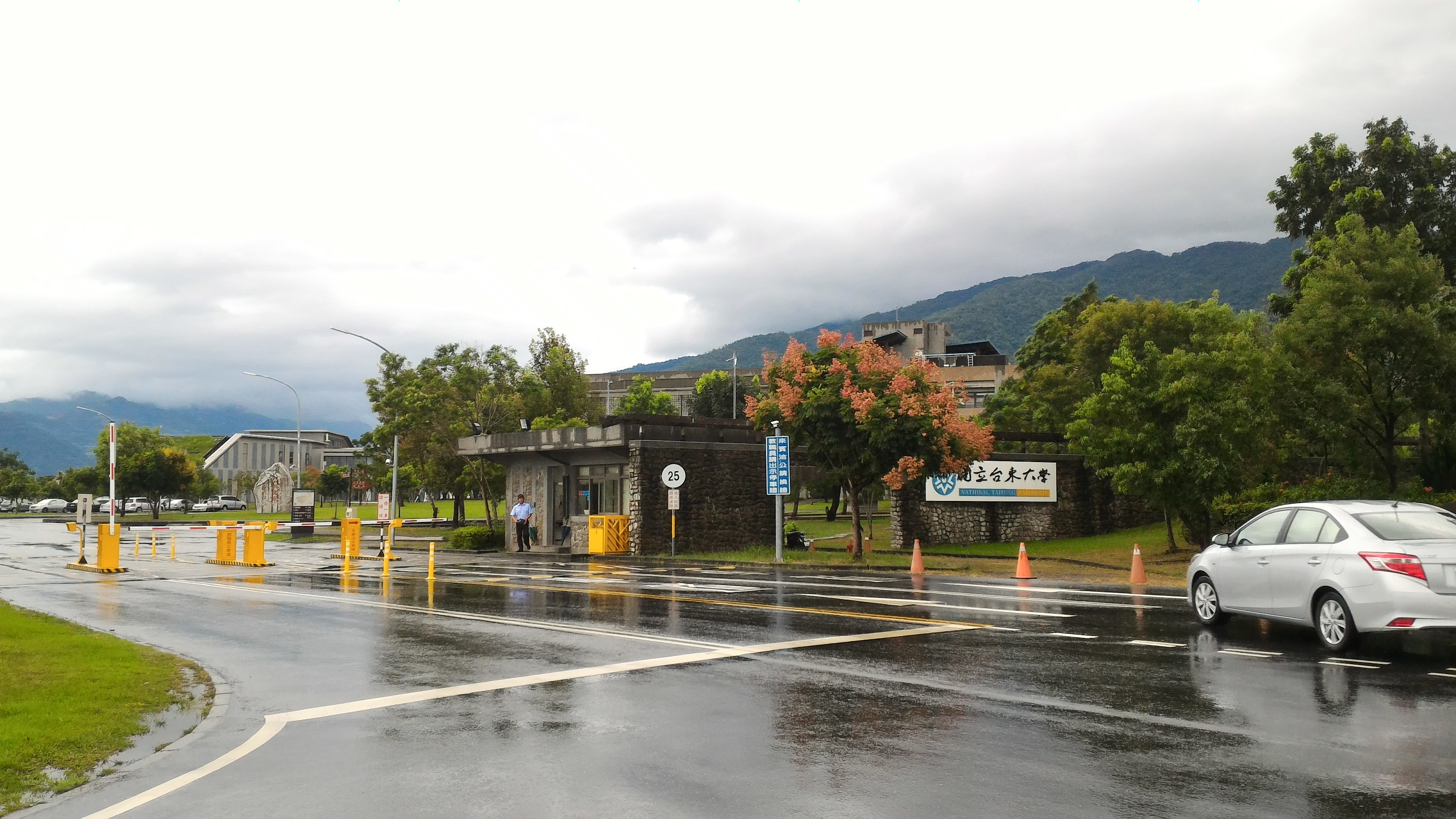
National Taitung University

- National Taitung Junior College
- National Taitung University

== Tourist attractions ==
- Beinan Cultural Park
- Datong Theater
- Fugang Fishery Harbor
- Kararuan (加路蘭) Recreation Area

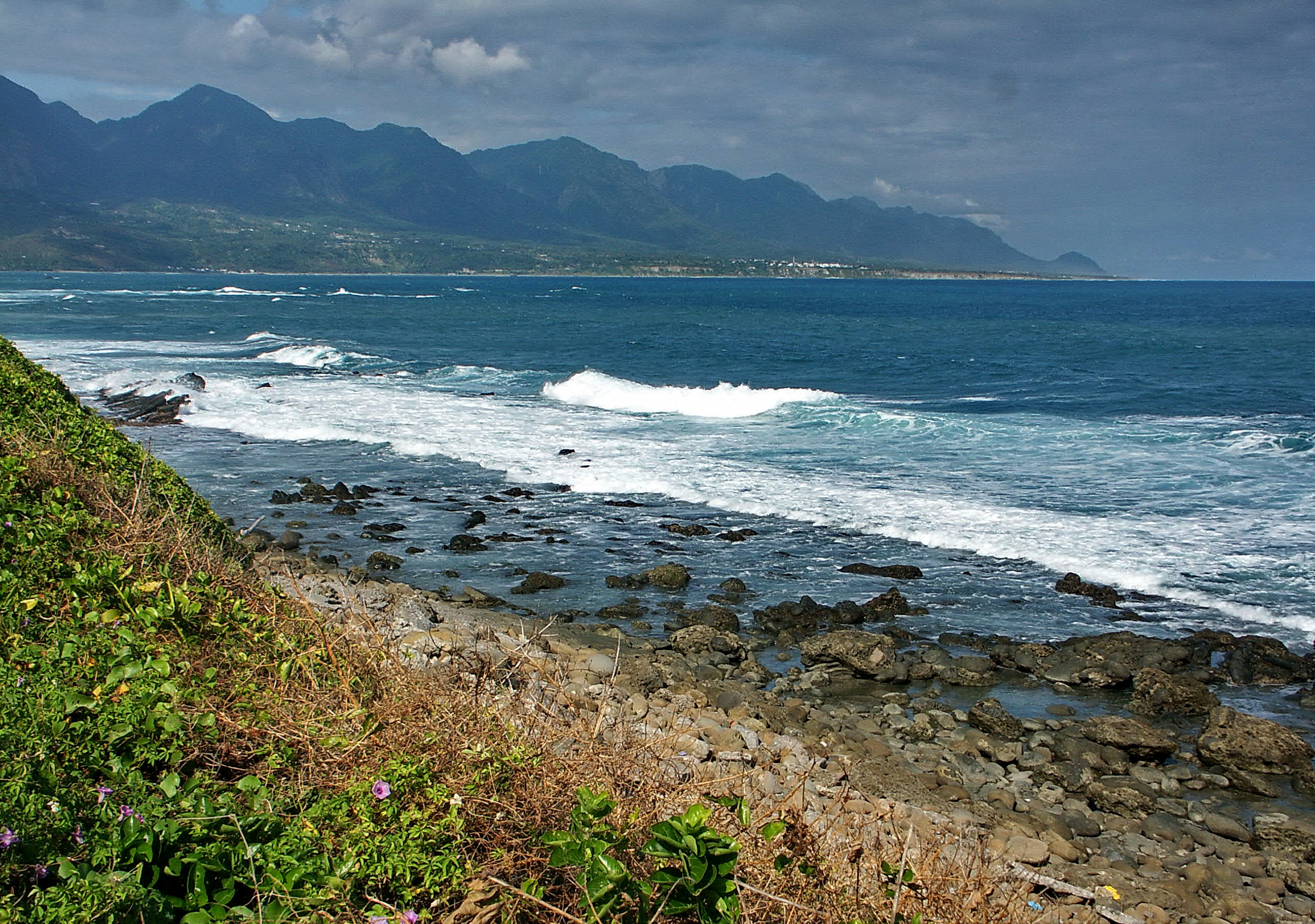
Kararuan Coast

- Liyushan (鯉魚山) Park
- Makabahai Park (馬卡巴嗨公園)
- Moving Castle
- National Museum of Prehistory
- Paposogan (Seaside Park)
- Taitung Aboriginal Gallery
- Taitung Art Museum
- Taitung Chinese Association
- Taitung Forest Park
  - Pipa Lake
- Taitung Performing Art Center
- Taitung Railway Art Village
- Taitung Story Museum
- Tiehua Music Village (鐵花村)
- Xiao Yehliu (小野柳)
- Zhiben Wetlands

== Transportation ==
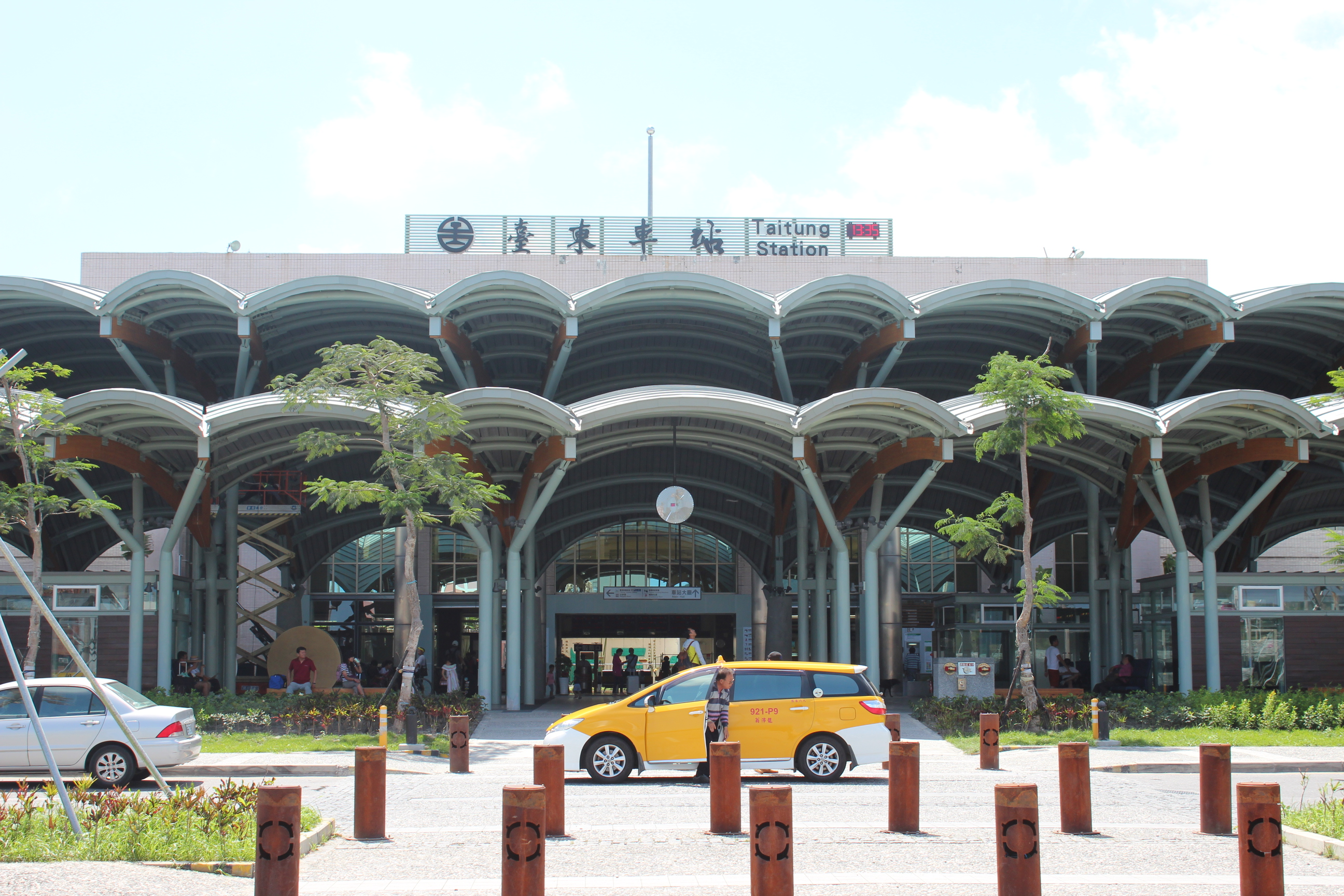
TRA Taitung Station

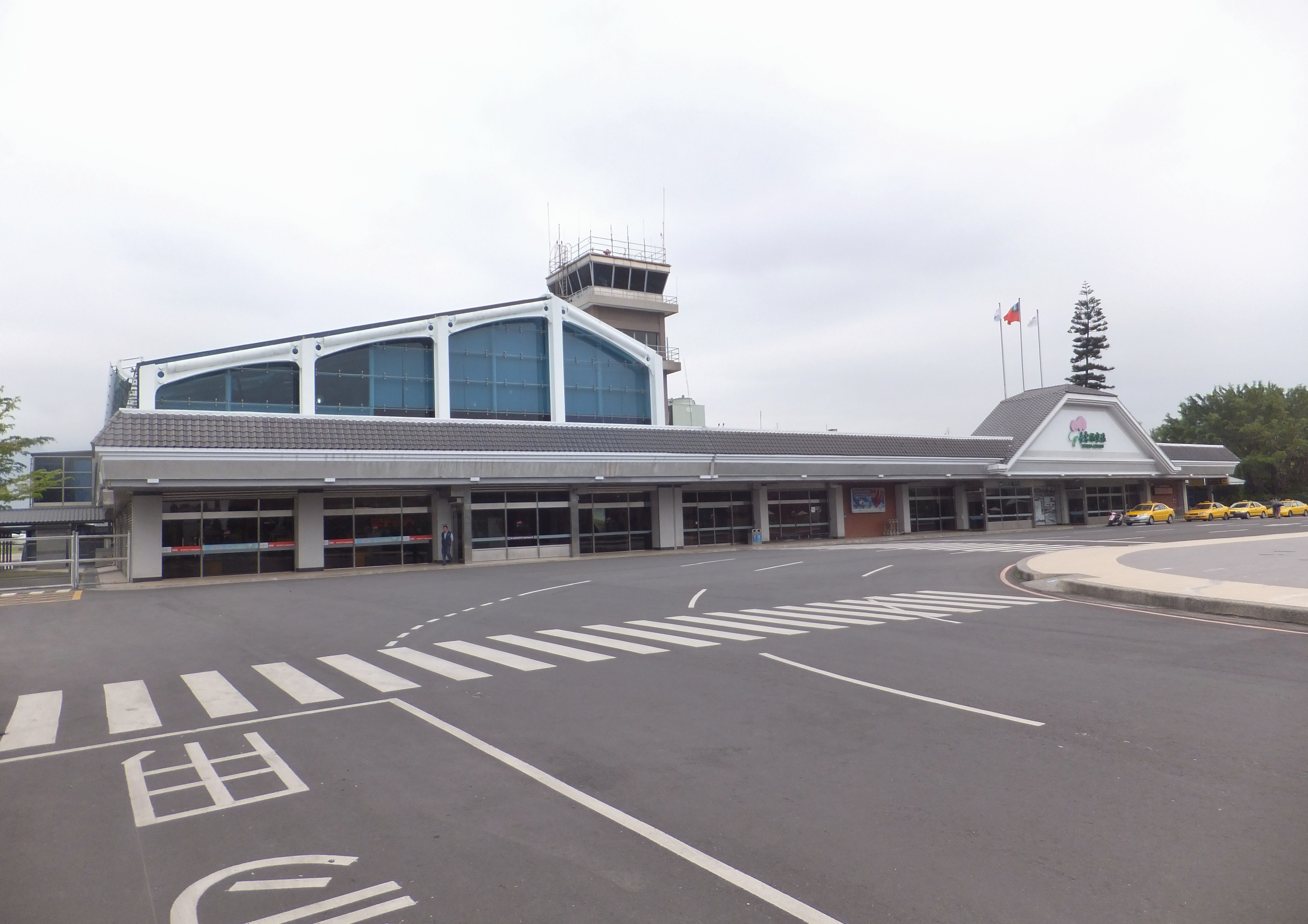
Taitung Airport

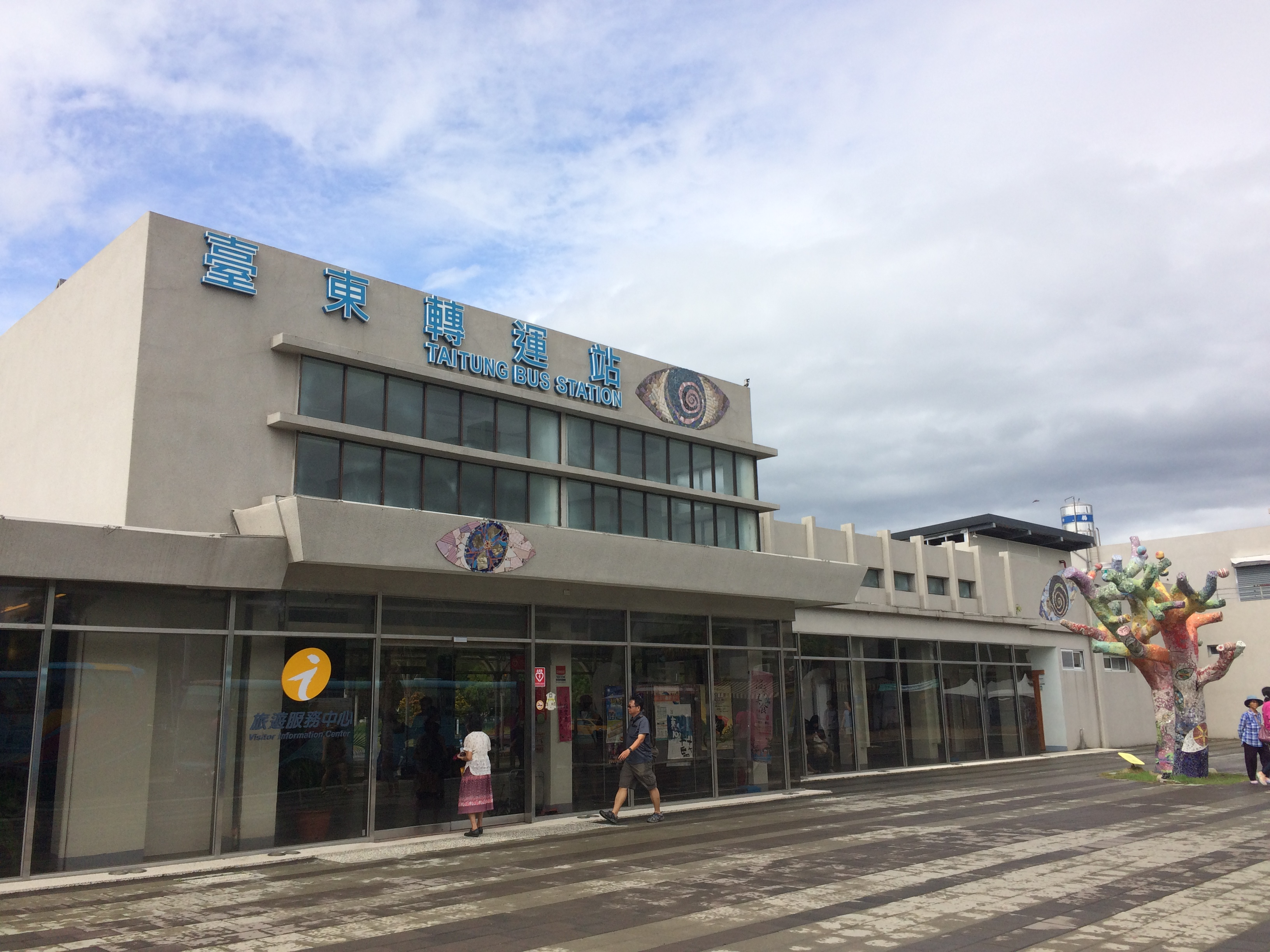
Taitung Bus Station

- Taiwan Railway: Hwa-tung Line, South-Link Line
  - Taitung Station
  - Kangle Station
  - Zhiben Station
- Taiwan Provincial Highway System
  - Provincial Highway No. 9
  - Provincial Highway No. 11
- Port
  - Fugang Fishery Harbor - ferry port to Orchid Island and Green Island
- Airport
  - Taitung Airport

== Notable natives ==
- Jia Jia, singer and songwriter.
