= Taitung County =

Taitung County 臺東縣 Taitō, Tâi-tang
- County
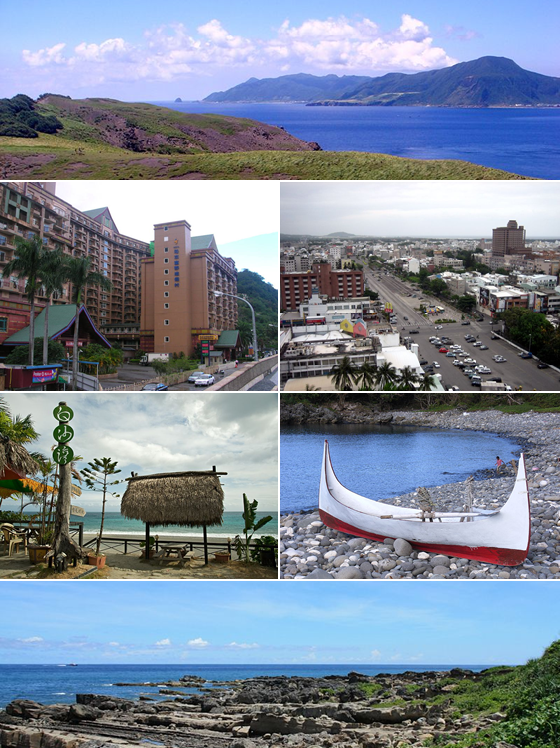
- Top: View of Orchid Island, from Ji-teiwan, Second left: Zhiben Spa area, Second right: A view of downtown Taitung, Third left: View of White Sand Bay in Taimali Township, Third right: A memorial for Yami people's boat in Orchid Island, Bottom: A coast of Xiaoyeliu

- Flag Logo

- Coordinates: 22°56′N 120°56′E
- Country: Taiwan
- Region: Eastern Taiwan
- Seat: Taitung City
- Largest city: Taitung City
- Boroughs: 1 cities, 15 (2 urban, 13 rural) townships

Government
  - County Magistrate: April Yao (KMT)

Area
  - Total: 3,515.2526 km^{2} (1,357.2466 sq mi)
  - Rank: 3 of 22

Population (September 2023)
  - Total: 211,681
  - Rank: 22 of 22
  - Density: 60.2179/km^{2} (155.964/sq mi)
- Time zone: UTC+8 (National Standard Time)
- ISO 3166 code: TW-TTT
- Website: www.taitung.gov.tw
- Symbols
- Flower: Moth orchid (Phalaenopsis)
- Tree: Camphor tree (Cinnamomum camphora)

Taitung County
- Traditional Chinese: 臺東縣 or 台東縣
- Simplified Chinese: 台东县
Transcriptions
Standard Mandarin
- Hanyu Pinyin: Táidōng Xiàn
- Bopomofo: ㄊㄞˊ ㄉㄨㄥ ㄒㄧㄢˋ
- Gwoyeu Romatzyh: Tairdong Shiann
- Wade–Giles: Tʻai^{2}-tung^{1} Hsien^{4}
- Tongyong Pinyin: Táidong Siàn
- Yale Romanization: Táidūng Syàn
- MPS2: Táidūng Shiàn
- IPA: [tʰǎɪ.tʊ́ŋ ɕjɛ̂n]
Hakka
- Pha̍k-fa-sṳ: Thòi-tûng-yen
Southern Min
- Hokkien POJ: Tâi-tang-koān
- Tâi-lô: Tâi-tang-kuān

Taitung (Note: In local languages: Traditional Chinese script: 臺東縣; Mandarin Pinyin: Táidōng Xiàn; Hokkien: Tâi-tang-kuān; Sixian Hakka: Thòi-tûng-yen; Paiwan: Valangaw) (Wade–Giles: Tʻai^{2}-tung^{1}; lit. 'Eastern part of Taiwan') is the third largest county in Taiwan, located primarily on the island's southeastern coast and also including Green Island, Orchid Island and Lesser Orchid Island. The seat is located in Taitung City.

== Name ==
While its name means "Eastern Taiwan", it is also known as "Houshan" (Chinese: 後山; pinyin: hòushān; Pe̍h-ōe-jī: āu-soaⁿ) by many of the locals, meaning behind the mountains or the back mountains.

== History ==
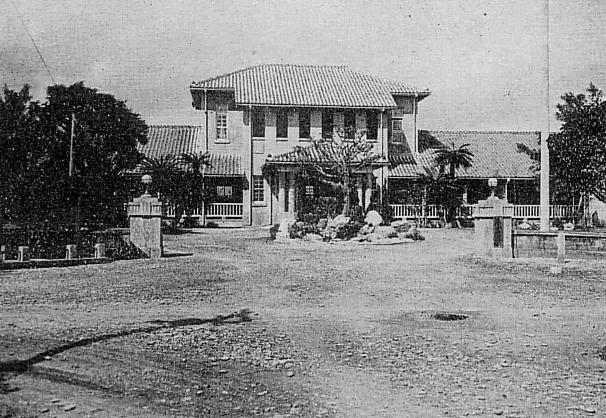
Taitō Prefecture government building

=== Qing dynasty ===
In 1887, the new Fujian-Taiwan Province included Taitung Prefecture as one of four prefectures.

=== Empire of Japan ===
During the Japanese rule of Taiwan, Taitung County was administered as Taitō Prefecture.

=== Republic of China ===
After the handover of Taiwan from Japan to the Republic of China on 25 October 1945, Taitung was established as a county of Taiwan Province on 25 December the same year.

== Geography ==
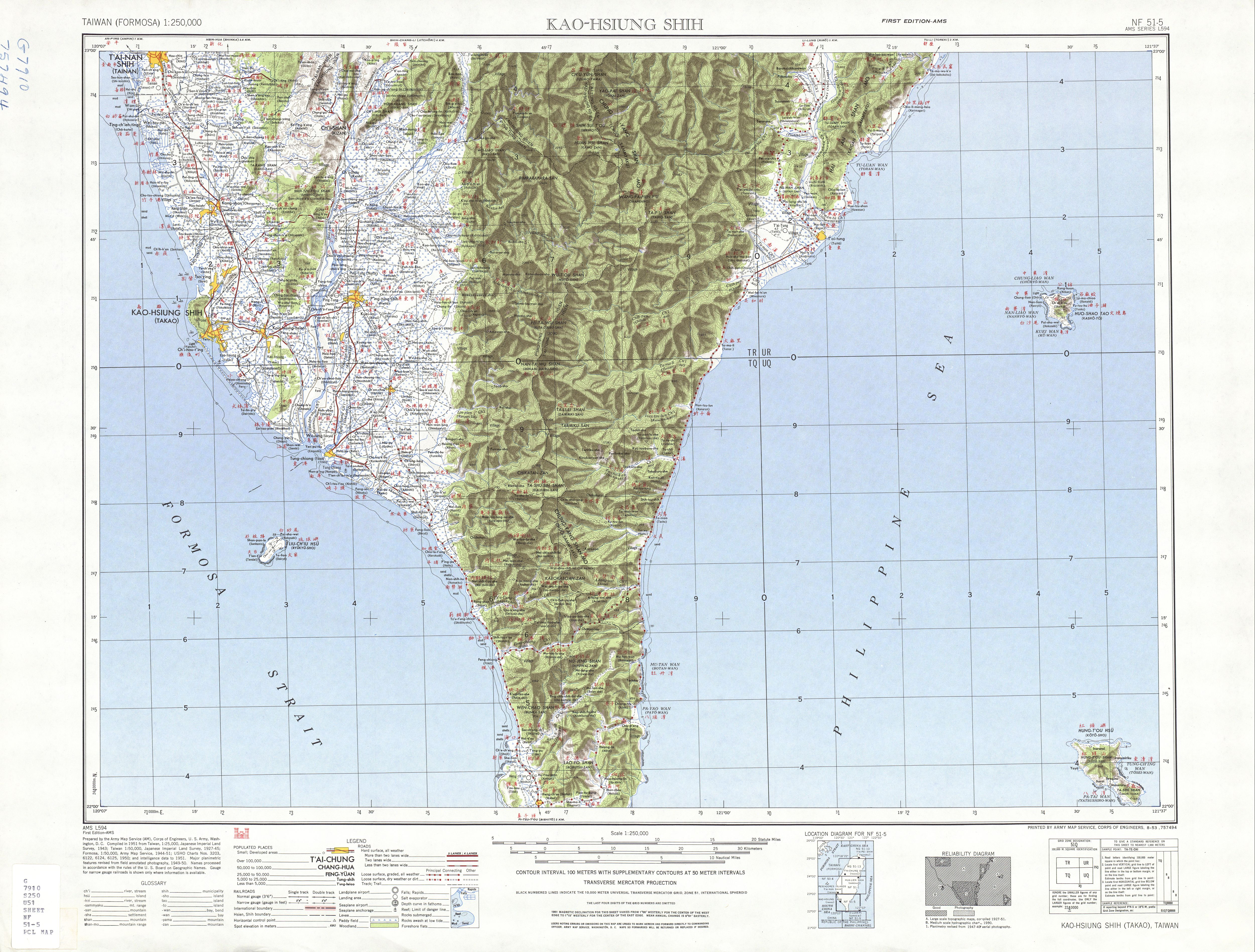
T'ai-tung (Taitō) 臺東 (1951)

Taitung runs along the southeastern coast of Taiwan. Taitung County, controlling 3,515 km^{2} (1,357 sq mi) is the 3rd largest county in Taiwan after Hualien County and Nantou County. Mainland Taitung County's coastline is 166 km (103 mi) long. The Huatung Valley runs along the northern half of the county. Taitung currently has a population of 234,123.

Due in part to its remote location and isolation by mountains from Taiwan's main population centers, Taitung was the last part of the island to be colonized by Han Chinese immigrants (late 19th century). Throughout the 20th century Taitung remained an economic backwater. Sparsely populated even today, Taitung mostly escaped the urbanization and pollution that have come to plague much of the island's lowland areas.

In addition to the area on Taiwan proper, the county includes two major islands, Green Island or Isla Verde and Orchid Island. Green Island was home to an infamous penal colony used for political prisoners during the "White Terror" period of Chinese Nationalist (KMT) rule (from 1947 until the end of martial law in 1987). Orchid Island, home of the Tao people (Taiwanese aborigines closely related to the people of the northern Philippines), has become a major tourist attraction despite the government-operated Taiwan Power Company's controversial use of part of the island as a nuclear waste dump.

== Government ==
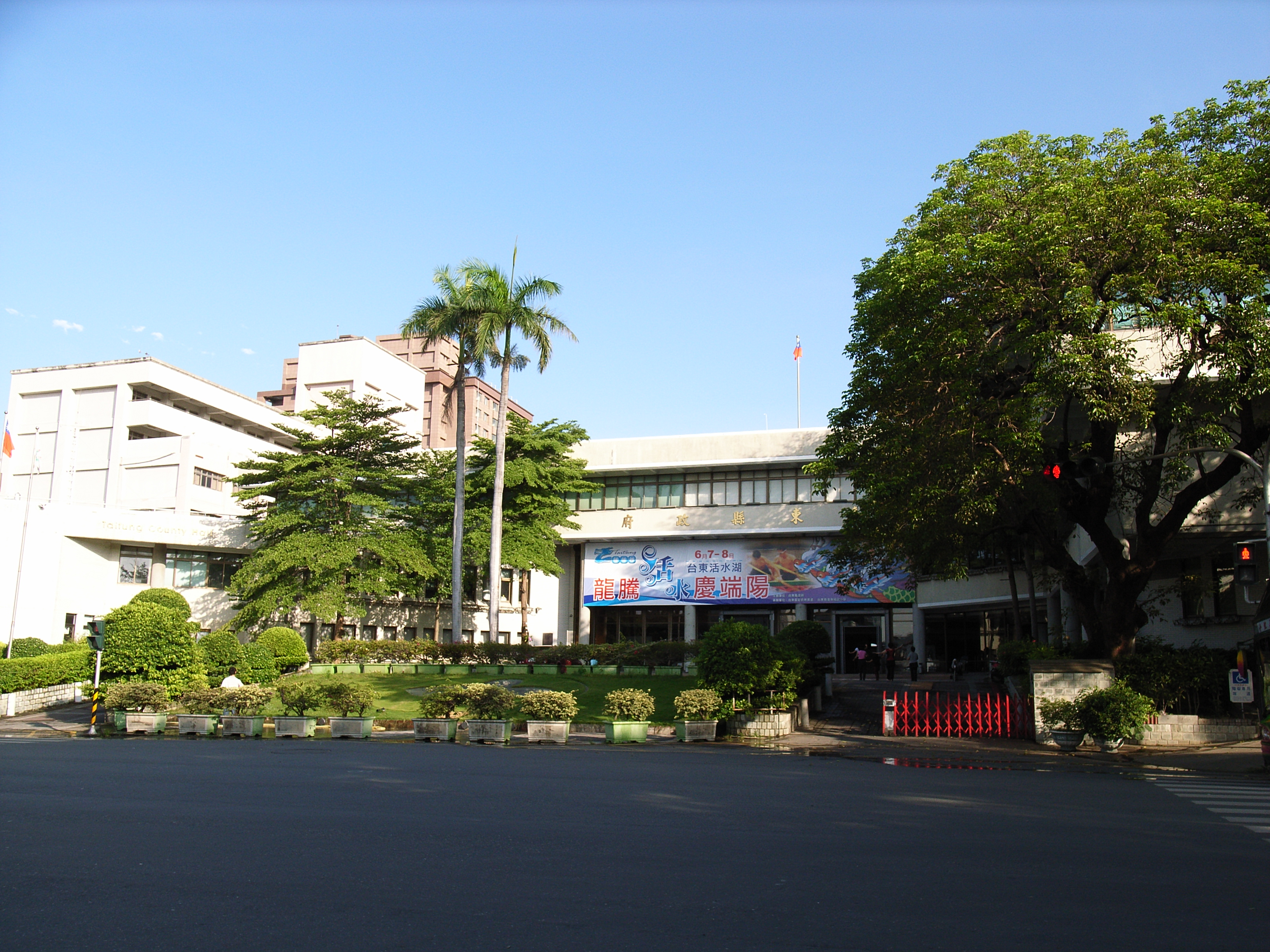
Taitung County Government

Taitung County Council

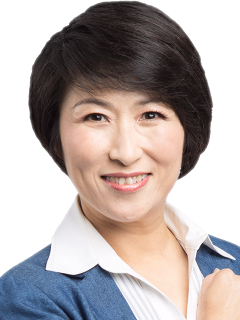
April Yao, the incumbent Magistrate of Taitung County.

=== Administrative divisions ===
Taitung County is divided into 1 city, 2 urban townships, 8 rural townships and 5 mountain indigenous townships. Taitung County has the second highest number of mountain indigenous townships in Taiwan after Pingtung County. The seat of the county is located at Taitung City, where it houses the Taitung County Government and Taitung County Council. The current Magistrate of Taitung County is April Yao of the Kuomintang. After streamlining of Taiwan Province in 1998, the county has since directly governed by the Executive Yuan.

Type	Name	Chinese	Taiwanese	Hakka	Formosan	Japanese and other
City	Taitung City	臺東市	Tâi-tang	Thòi-tûng	Pusung^{Amis, Paiwan, Puyuma}	
Urban townships	Chenggong	成功鎮	Sêng-kong	Sṳ̀n-kûng	Madawdaw^{Amis}	
Urban townships	Guanshan	關山鎮	Koan-san	Kûan-sân	Kinalaungan^{Bunun}	
Rural townships	Beinan	卑南鄉	Pi-lâm	Pî-nàm	Puyuma^{Amis, Puyuma}, Pinang^{Rukai}	
Rural townships	Changbin	長濱鄉	Tn̂g-pin	Tshòng-pîn	Kakacawan^{Amis}	Nagahama (長浜)
Rural townships	Chishang (Chishang)	池上鄉	Tî-siōng	Tshṳ̀-song		Ikegami (池上)
Rural townships	Dawu	大武鄉	Tāi-bú	Thai-vú	Palangoe^{Paiwan}	
Rural townships	Donghe	東河鄉	Tong-hô	Tûng-hò	Fafukod^{Amis}	
Rural townships	Ludao	綠島鄉	Le̍k-tó	Liu̍k-tó	Sanasay^{Amis}, Jitanasey^{Yami}	Green Island
Rural townships	Luye	鹿野鄉	Lo̍k-iá	Lu̍k-yâ		Shikano (鹿野)
Rural townships	Taimali	太麻里鄉	Thài-mâ-lí	Thai-mà-lî	Tjavualji^{Amis, Paiwan}	
Mountain indigenous townships	Daren	達仁鄉	Ta̍t-jîn	Tha̍t-yìn	Tadren^{Paiwan}	
Mountain indigenous townships	Haiduan	海端鄉	Hái-toaⁿ	Hói-tôn	Haitutuan^{Bunun}	
Mountain indigenous townships	Jinfeng (Jinfong)	金峰鄉	Kim-hong	Kîm-fûng	Kinzang^{Paiwan}	
Mountain indigenous townships	Lanyu	蘭嶼鄉	Lân-sū	Làn-yí	Ponso no Tao^{Yami}	Orchid Island
Mountain indigenous townships	Yanping	延平鄉	Iân-pêng	Yèn-phìn	Inpiing^{Bunun}	

Colors indicates the common languages status of Hakka and Formosan languages within each division.

=== Politics ===
Taitung County elected one Democratic Progressive Party legislator to the Legislative Yuan during the 2016 legislative election.

== Demographics ==
Historical population
Year	Pop.	±%
1950	116,252	—
1955	159,651	+37.3%
1960	208,272	+30.5%
1965	260,322	+25.0%
1970	291,761	+12.1%
1975	291,111	−0.2%
1980	281,218	−3.4%
1985	276,389	−1.7%
1990	256,803	−7.1%
1995	254,375	−0.9%
2000	245,312	−3.6%
2005	238,943	−2.6%
2010	230,673	−3.5%
2015	222,452	−3.6%
2020	215,261	−3.2%
2025	208,320	−3.2%
Source: 1. "臺東縣現住人口密度、性比例及戶量 (1946-1980)" (pdf). 臺東縣統計要覽 (Report) (in Chinese (Taiwan)). Vol. 中華民國69年度(70. 8). 臺東縣政府. August 1981. p. 26.; 2. "縣市人口按性別及五齡組" (in Chinese (Taiwan)). Department of Household Registration,Ministry of the Interior (Taiwan).

Taitung County is home to seven aboriginal ethnicities, including Amis, Bunun, Kavalan, Paiwan, Puyuma, Rukai and Yami. Taitung County has the largest aboriginal to overall population of a county or city in Taiwan, at 35.5%.

View source data.

== Education ==
Education in Taitung County is administered under the Education Department of the Taitung County Government.

- National Taitung University
- National Taitung Junior College

== Culture ==
Taitung County is home to several distinct indigenous cultures. Due to a lower level of Han Chinese settlement compared to other counties, many indigenous traditions remain integrated into local society.

== Energy ==
Taitung County houses the Lanyu Power Plant, a 6.5 MW fuel-fired power plant located in Orchid Island.

== Tourist attractions ==
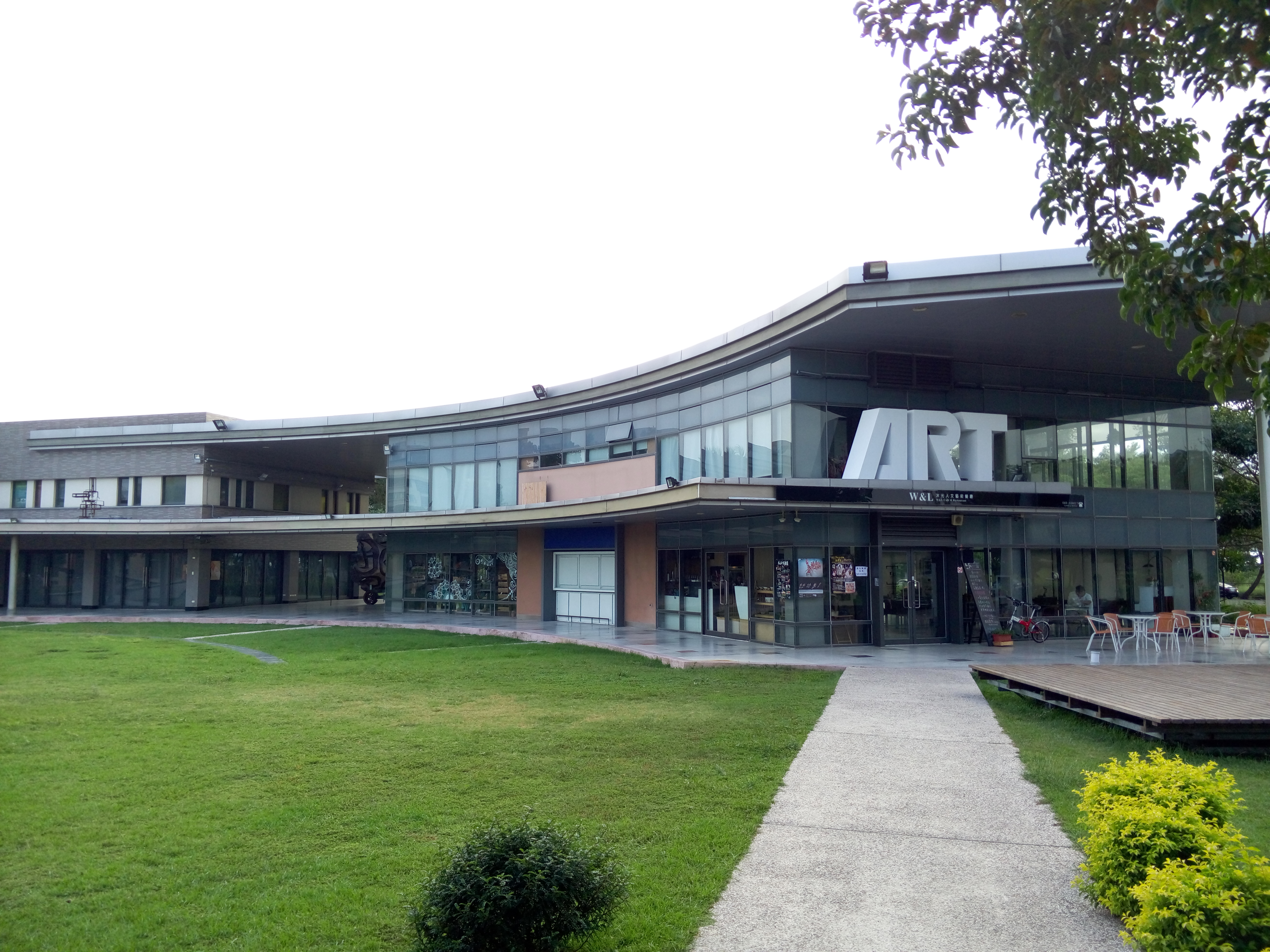
Taitung Art Museum

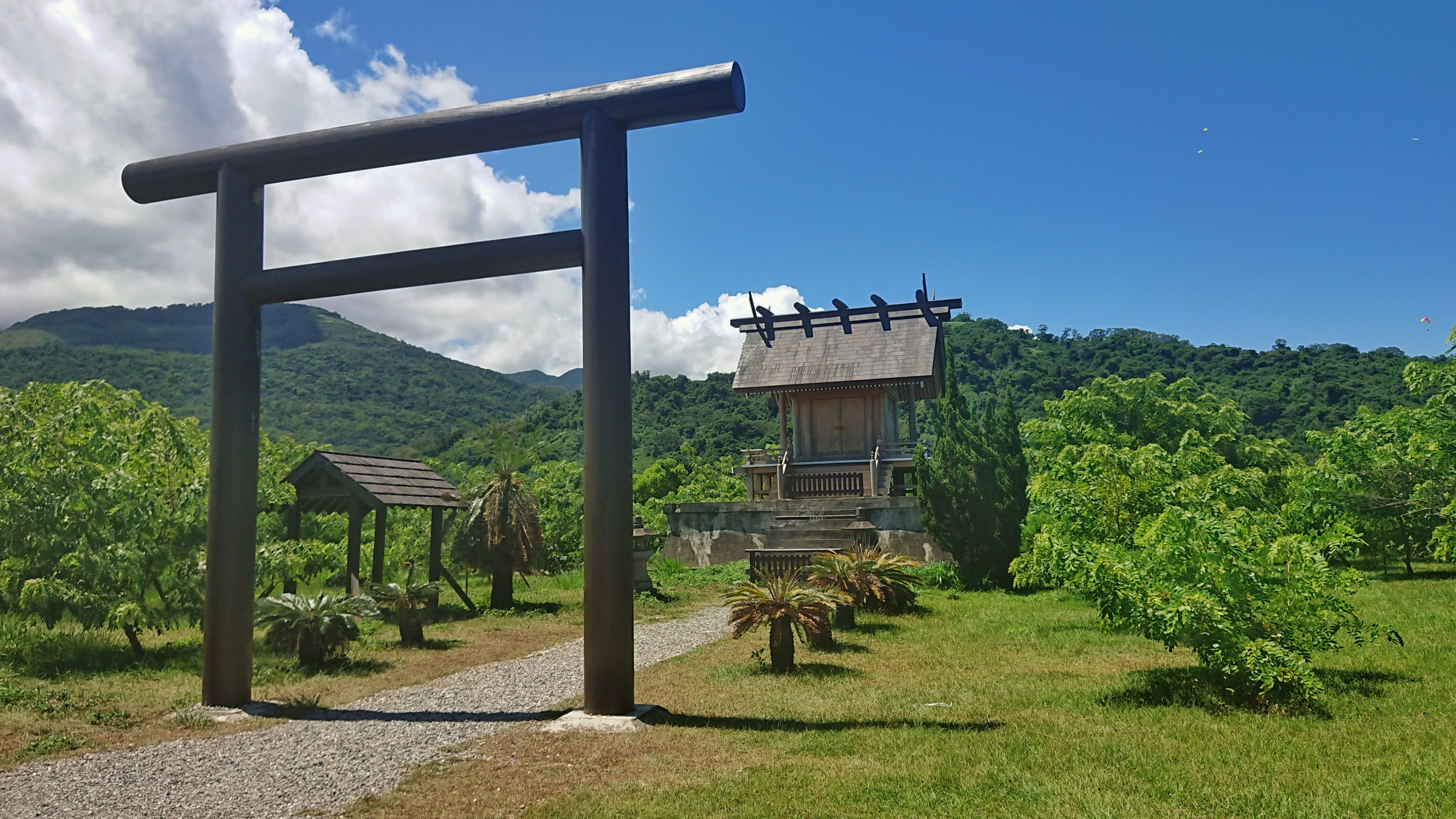
Luye Jinja

=== Buildings ===
Duoliang Station, Kunci Temple, Green Island Lighthouse, Moving Castle and Taitung Chinese Association.

=== Historical sites ===
Beinan Cultural Park, Dulan Site and Green Island White Terror Memorial Park.

=== Museums and galleries ===
Lanyu Flying Fish Cultural Museum, National Museum of Prehistory, Rice Village Museum, Taitung Aboriginal Gallery, Taitung Art Museum, Taitung County Museum of Natural History, Taitung Performing Art Center, Taitung Story Museum, Wu Tao Chishang Lunch Box Cultural History Museum.

=== Nature ===
Baxian Caves, Chulu Ranch, Dapo Pond, East Coast National Scenic Area, East Rift Valley National Scenic Area, Green Island, Zhiben National Forest Recreation Area, Mount Dulan, Orchid Island, Sanxiantai, Sika Deer Ecological Park, Taitung Forest Park, Xiangyang National Forest Recreation Area and Zhaori Hot Spring.

=== Theme parks ===
Bunun Tribal Leisure Farm

== Transportation ==
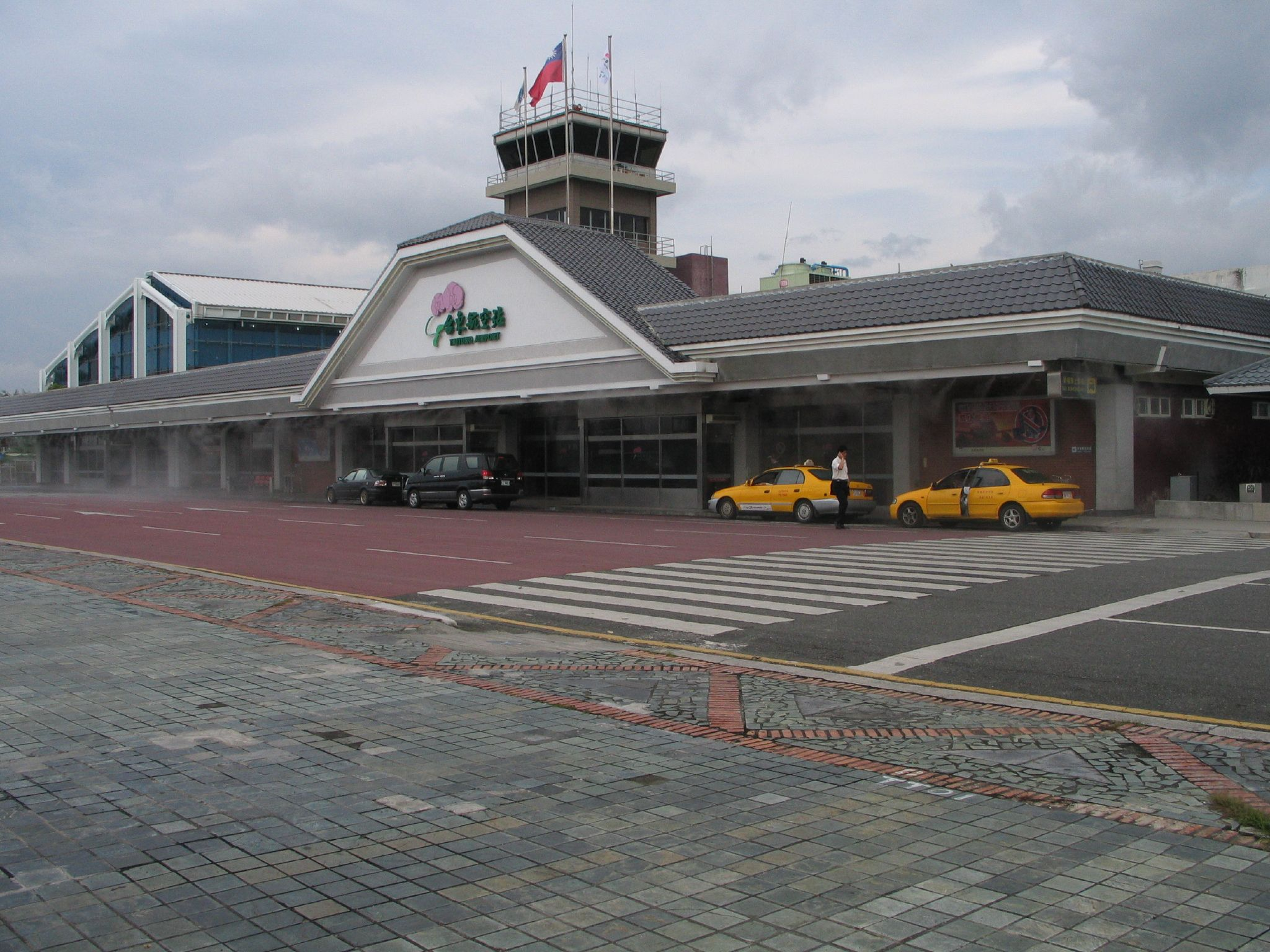
Taitung Airport

=== Air ===
Taitung County houses the international Taitung Airport in the mainland Taitung County of Taitung City and another two airports at the outlying islands, which are Green Island Airport in Green Island and Lanyu Airport in Orchid Island.

=== Rail ===
Taitung County is crossed by two Taiwan Railway lines of South-Link Line and Hualien–Taitung Line. The stations consist of Chishang, Dawu, Guanshan, Guzhuang, Haiduan, Jinlun, Kangle, Longxi, Luye, Ruihe, Ruiyuan, Shanli, Taimali, Taitung and Zhiben Station.

=== Water ===
Chenggong Fish Harbor, Fugang Fishery Harbor and Green Island Nanliao Harbor.

== Notable natives ==
- Yu Chang, Major League Baseball player
- Yang Chuan-kwang, 1960 Summer Olympics decathlon medalist
- Tank, singer
- A-Mei, singer
- Cudjuy Patjidres, tattoo artist
