= Arts centre =

Community centre encouraging the arts

An arts centre (also spelled with "art" or "center") is distinct from an art gallery or art museum. An arts centre is a functional community centre with a specific remit to encourage arts practice and to provide facilities such as theatre space, gallery space, venues for musical performance, workshop areas, educational facilities, technical equipment, etc.

In the United States, "art centers" are generally either establishments geared toward exposing, generating, and making accessible art making to arts-interested individuals, or buildings that rent primarily to artists, galleries, or companies involved in art making.

In Britain, the Bluecoat Society of Arts was founded in Liverpool in 1927 following the efforts of a group of artists and art lovers who had occupied Bluecoat Chambers since 1907. Most British art centres began after World War II and gradually changed from mainly middle-class places to 1960s and 1970s trendy, alternative centres and eventually in the 1980s to serving the whole community with a programme of enabling access to wheelchair users and disabled individuals and groups.

In the rest of Europe it is common among most art centres that they are partly government funded, since they are considered to have a positive influence on society and economics according to the Rhineland model philosophy. Many of those organisations started in the 1970s, 1980s and 1990s as squatted spaces and were later legalised.

== List of arts centres ==
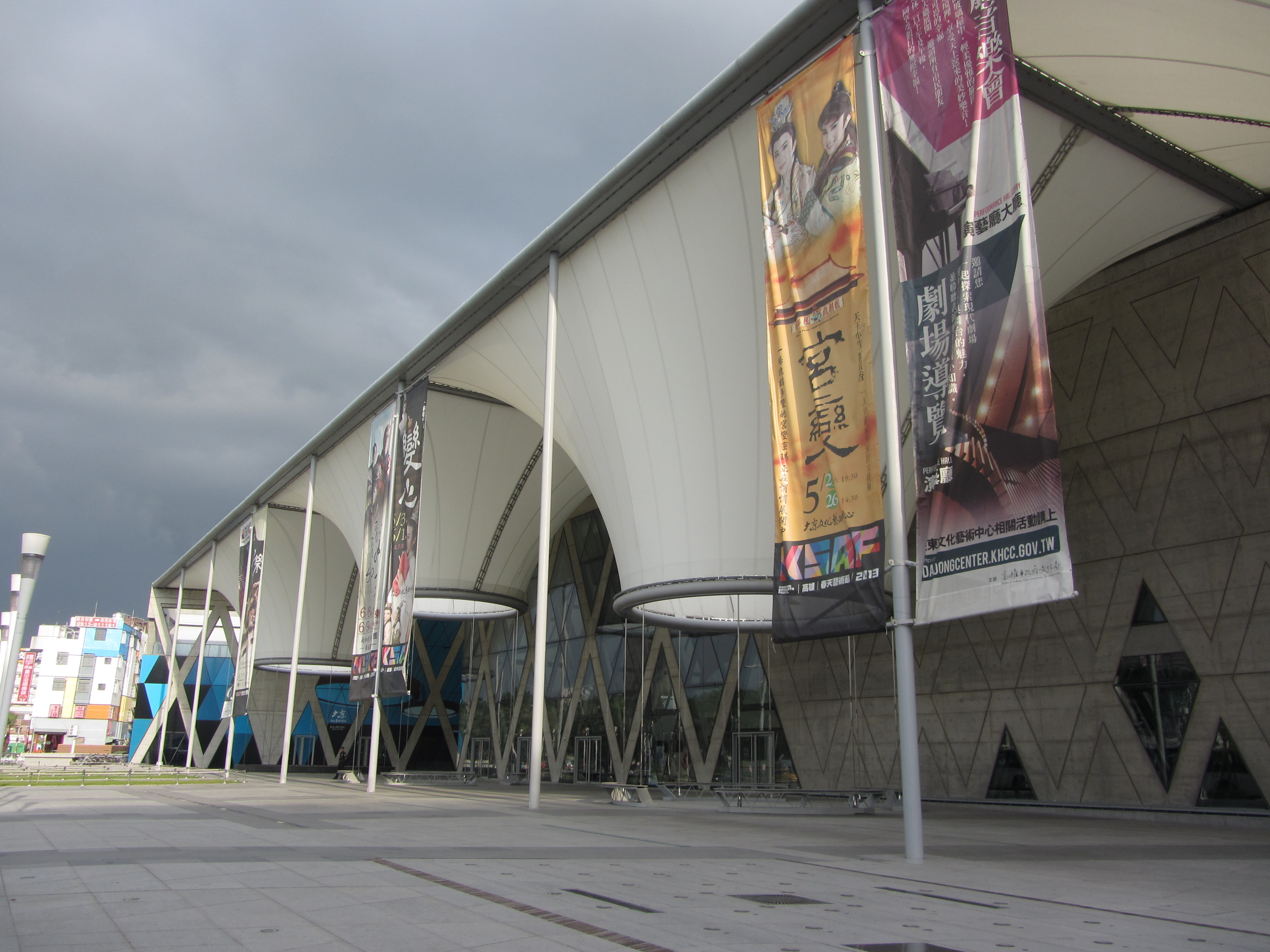
Dadong Arts Center in Kaohsiung, Taiwan.

=== North America ===
==== Canada ====
- Calgary, Alberta: Arts Commons
- Charlottetown, Prince Edward Island: Confederation Centre of the Arts
- Ottawa, Ontario: National Arts Centre
- Toronto, Ontario: Toronto Centre for the Arts
- Vancouver, British Columbia: Firehall Arts Centre
- Winnipeg, Manitoba: Manitoba Centennial Centre

==== United States ====
- Alexandria, Virginia Torpedo Factory Art Center
- Arlington, Virginia: Artisphere
- Atlanta, Georgia: Eyedrum
- Chicago, Illinois: Hairpin Arts Center, Hyde Park Art Center, Lillstreet Art Center, South Side Community Art Center
- Dallas, Texas: The Dallas Contemporary
- Huntington, West Virginia: Marshall University Visual Arts Center
- Indianapolis, Indiana: Indy Art Center
- Lebanon, New Hampshire: AVA Gallery and Art Center
- Los Angeles, California: Los Angeles Music Center (officially the Performing Arts Center of Los Angeles County)
- Mesa, Arizona: Mesa Arts Center
- Milford, Pennsylvania: Pike County Arts and Crafts
- Minneapolis, Minnesota: Walker Art Center
- New York City, New York: Apexart, Exit Art, International Studio & Curatorial Program, Lincoln Center for the Performing Arts
- Philadelphia, Pennsylvania: Kimmel Center for the Performing Arts, Painted Bride Art Center
- Pittsburgh, Pennsylvania: Pittsburgh Center for the Arts, Pittsburgh Glass Center
- Raleigh, North Carolina: Pullen Park
- Reading, Pennsylvania: GoggleWorks Center for the Arts
- Williamsport, Pennsylvania: Community Arts Center

=== Europe ===
==== Belgium ====
- Ghent: Vooruit

Italy

==== France ====
- Nantes: Le Lieu unique

==== Netherlands ====
- Amsterdam: OT301
- Nijmegen: Extrapool
- Rotterdam: WORM

==== Spain ====
- Matadero Madrid
- Gijón: LABoral Centro de Arte y Creación Industrial

==== United Kingdom ====
- Aberystwyth: Aberystwyth Arts Centre (1970–present)
- Belfast Metropolitan Arts Centre (2012–present)
- Birmingham: mac (1962–present)
- Bridgwater Bridgwater Arts Centre (10 October 1946 – present)
- Brighton and Hove: Attenborough Centre for the Creative Arts (1969–2007 as Gardner Arts Centre, 2016–present)
- Bristol:
  - Cube Microplex formally Bristol Arts Centre (1964–present)
  - Arnolfini (1961–present)
- Cambridgeshire: Wysing Arts Centre (1989–present)
- Cardiff: Chapter Arts Centre (1971–present)
- Colchester: Colchester Arts Centre (1980–present)
- Coventry: Warwick Arts Centre (?–present)
- Derby: Quad (2008–present)
- Dundee: Dundee Contemporary Arts (1999–present)
- Edinburgh: Summerhall (as arts centre, 2011–present)
- Fareham: Ashcroft Arts Centre (1989–present)
- Glasgow:
  - Third Eye Centre (1975–1991)
  - Centre for Contemporary Arts (1992–present)
- Havant: The Spring Arts & Heritage Centre (?–present)
- Leicester: Attenborough Arts Centre (?–present)
- Liverpool:
  - The Bluecoat (1927–present)
  - FACT Liverpool (2003–present)
- London:
  - Barbican Centre (1982–present)
  - Camden Arts Centre (1965 (as Hampstead Arts Centre)–present)
  - Southbank Centre (1951–present)
  - Battersea Arts Centre (1980–present)
- Manchester:
  - Cornerhouse (1985–2015)
  - HOME (2015–present)
- Newcastle: Newcastle Arts Centre (founded 1980, opened 1988–present)
- Nottingham: Nottingham Contemporary (2009–present)
- Norwich: Norwich Arts Centre (1977–present)
- Omagh: Strule Arts Centre (?–present)
- Poole: Lighthouse (Poole) (1978–present; formerly Poole Arts Centre)
- Plymouth: Plymouth Arts Centre (1947–present)
- Swindon: Swindon Arts Centre (1956–present)

=== Asia ===
==== China ====
- Huaxia Art Centre, Shenzhen

==== Israel ====
- Gerard Behar Center, Jerusalem

==== Indonesia ====
- Ciputra Artpreneur, Jakarta

==== Philippines ====
- National Arts Center, Los Baños, Laguna
- Cultural Center of the Philippines Complex, City of Manila

==== Taiwan ====
- Changhua: Lukang Artist Village, National Changhua Living Art Center
- Chiayi City: Art Site of Chiayi Railway Warehouse, Chiayi Cultural and Creative Industries Park
- Hsinchu City: Hsinchu City Art Site of Railway Warehouse, National Hsinchu Living Arts Center
- Hualien: Hualien Cultural and Creative Industries Park
- Kaohsiung: Dadong Arts Center, Meinong Cultural and Creative Center, National Kaohsiung Center for the Arts, Pier-2 Art Center
- Keelung: Embrace Cultural and Creative Park
- Miaoli: Wu Chuo-liu Art and Cultural Hall
- New Taipei: Banqiao 435 Art Zone, Xinzhuang Culture and Arts Center
- Pingtung: Pingtung Performing Arts Center
- Taichung: Taichung City Tun District Art Center, Taichung Cultural and Creative Industries Park, Taichung Shiyakusho
- Tainan: Blueprint Culture and Creative Park, National Tainan Living Arts Center
- Taipei: Huashan 1914 Creative Park, Mind Set Art Center, National Taiwan Arts Education Center, Puppetry Art Center of Taipei, Songshan Cultural and Creative Park, Taipei City Arts Promotion Office
- Taitung: National Taitung Living Art Center, Taitung Railway Art Village
- Taoyuan: Taoyuan Arts Center, Zhongli Arts Hall
- Yilan: National Center for Traditional Arts

==== Thailand ====
- Bangkok Art and Culture Centre

=== Oceania ===
==== Australia ====
- Arts Centre Melbourne, in Victoria

==== New Zealand ====
- Christchurch Arts Centre, in Christchurch

==== Papua New Guinea ====
- Creative Arts Centre (Papua New Guinea) (became National Arts Centre and merged into University of Papua New Guinea)

== See also ==
- Artivism
- Cultural centre
- Infoshop
- Music venue
- Not-for-profit arts organisation
- Social centre
