= PNC Arts Annex =

Arts center in Dayton, Ohio, US

The PNC Arts Annex is an arts center in downtown Dayton, Ohio. Opened in 2018, the center contains risers and flexible seating, as well as a multipurpose studio.

Dayton Live, the primary performing arts organization for the city, uses the Arts Annex to host programs such as after-school programs and summer camps. One popular program hosted in the Annex is the Community Spotlight Program, which provides a venue for under-resourced community groups, musicians, poets, performing arts companies, and similar organizations.

Former President and CEO Ty Sutton of Dayton Live said "We build [the Arts Annex] to be for the community to create art". The regional president of PNC Bank agreed, stating "Today is about opening up and investing in our community and creating arts access for all people in our community. Really creating a diverse and inclusive way for people to be creative and take notice of big things happening in small places."
