= Assertive community treatment =

System for treating mental illness

Assertive community treatment (ACT) is an intensive and highly integrated approach for community mental health service delivery. ACT teams serve individuals who have been diagnosed with serious and persistent forms of mental illness, predominantly but not exclusively the schizophrenia spectrum disorders. ACT service recipients may also have diagnostic profiles that include features typically found in other DSM-5 categories (for example, bipolar, depressive, anxiety, and personality disorders, among others). Many have histories of frequent psychiatric hospitalization, substance abuse, victimization and trauma, arrests and incarceration, homelessness, and additional significant challenges. The symptoms and complications of their mental illnesses have led to serious functioning difficulties in several areas of life, often including work, social relationships, residential independence, money management, and physical health and wellness. By the time they start receiving ACT services, they are likely to have experienced failure, discrimination, and stigmatization, and their hope for the future is likely to be quite low.

== Definition ==
The defining characteristics of ACT include:

- a focus on participants (also known as members, consumers, clients, or patients) who require the most help from the service delivery system;
- an explicit mission to promote the participants' independence, rehabilitation, community integration, and recovery, and in so doing to prevent homelessness, unnecessary hospitalization, and other negative outcomes;
- an emphasis on home visits and other in vivo (out of the office) interventions, eliminating the need to transfer newly learned skills from an artificial rehabilitation or treatment setting to the "real world" — indeed, this simple feature of the model has had a profound impact on psychiatric rehabilitation in general, because it shifts the burden of “fitting in” from service recipients to service providers, who now find it more difficult to prescribe, and thus to control, the characteristics of the intervention setting;
- a participant-to-staff ratio that is low enough to allow the ACT "core services team" to perform virtually all of the necessary rehabilitation, treatment, and community support tasks themselves in a coordinated and efficient manner—unlike traditional case managers, who broker or "farm out" most of the work to other service providers;
- a "total team" or "whole team" approach to intervention, in which all of the staff work with all of the participants, under the supervision and with the active participation of a mental health professional, who serves as the team's leader;
- an interdisciplinary program of continuous assessment, service planning, and intervention that typically involves — in addition to the team leader — a psychiatrist, social workers, nurses, occupational therapists, co-occurring disorder specialists, vocational rehabilitation specialists, and peer support specialists (individuals who have had personal, successful experience with the recovery process);
- a willingness to be a “one stop” intervention that takes ultimate professional responsibility for the participants' well-being in all areas of community functioning — including most especially the "nitty-gritty" aspects of everyday life — by providing a comprehensive array of services for every participant and ensuring clear staff-to-staff communication, through such measures as daily team meetings to review the previous 24-hour (or weekend) period and to plan for the coming days and weeks;
- a conscious effort to help people avoid crisis situations in the first place through careful planning, frequent communication, and flexible staff deployment, or — if the current plan isn't working — to revise it and intervene rapidly and assertively, with the goal of preventing hospitalizations (when possible), loss of housing, and other negative outcomes; and
- a commitment to work with people on a time-unlimited basis, as long as they still demonstrate the need for this intensive level of professional help, but also to help them move on when they are ready.

In the array of standard mental health service types, ACT is considered a "medically monitored non-residential service" (Level 4), making it more intensive than "high-intensity community-based services" (Level 3) but less intensive than "medically monitored residential services" (Level 5), as measured by the widely accepted LOCUS utilization management tool. While ACT is more staff-intensive than most other forms of community treatment, it is viewed as a less restrictive option for carefully selected service recipients, compared to custodial or more heavily supervised alternatives; see Olmstead v. L.C. In general, appropriate candidates are those for whom less intensive approaches have proven unsuccessful or insufficient.

== Early developments ==
ACT was first developed during the early 1970s, the heyday of deinstitutionalization, when large numbers of patients were being discharged from state-operated psychiatric hospitals to an underdeveloped, poorly integrated "nonsystem" of community services characterized (in the words of one of the model's founders) by serious "gaps" and "cracks." The founders were Leonard I. Stein, Mary Ann Test, Arnold J. Marx, Deborah J. Allness, William H. Knoedler, and their colleagues at the Mendota Mental Health Institute, a state operated psychiatric hospital in Madison, Wisconsin. Also known in the professional literature as the Training in Community Living project, the Program of Assertive Community Treatment (PACT), or simply the "Madison model," this innovation seemed radical at the time but has since evolved into one of the most influential service delivery approaches in the history of community mental health. The original Madison project received the American Psychiatric Association's prestigious Gold Award in 1974. After conceiving the model as a strategy to prevent hospitalization in a relatively heterogeneous sample of prospective state hospital patients, the PACT team turned its attention in the early 1980s to a more narrowly defined target group of young adults with early-stage schizophrenia.

== Dissemination of the original model ==
Since the late 1970s, the ACT approach has been replicated or adapted widely. The Harbinger program in Grand Rapids, Michigan, is generally recognized as the first replication, and a family-initiated early adaptation in Minnesota, known as Sharing Life in the Community when it was founded in 1976, also traces its origins to the Madison model.

Starting in 1978, Jerry Dincin, Thomas F. Witheridge, and their colleagues developed the Bridge assertive outreach program at the Thresholds psychiatric rehabilitation center in Chicago, Illinois—the first big-city adaptation of ACT and the first such program to focus on the most frequently hospitalized segment of the mental health consumer population. In the 1980s and '90s, Thresholds further adapted the approach to serve deaf people with mental illness, homeless people with mental illness, people experiencing psychiatric crises, and people with mental illness who are caught up in the criminal justice system.

In British Columbia, an experimental assertive outreach program based on the Thresholds model was established in 1988 and later expanded to additional sites. Outside of North America, one of the first research-based adaptations was an assertive outreach program in Australia. Other replications or adaptations of the ACT approach can be found throughout the English-speaking world and elsewhere. In Wisconsin, the original Madison model was adapted by its founders for the realities of a sparsely populated rural environment. The Veterans Health Administration has adapted the ACT model for use at multiple sites throughout the United States. There are also major program concentrations in Delaware, Florida, Georgia, Idaho, Illinois, Indiana (home of numerous research-based ACT programs and the Indiana ACT Center), Michigan, Minnesota, Missouri, New Jersey, New Mexico, New York, North Carolina (home to the UNC Institute for Best Practices), Ohio, Rhode Island, South Carolina, South Dakota, Texas, Virginia, Australia, Canada, and the United Kingdom, among many other places.

In 1998, the National Alliance on Mental Illness (NAMI) published the first manualization of the ACT model, written by two of its original developers, Allness and Knoedler. From 1998 to 2004, NAMI operated an ACT technical assistance center, dedicated to advocacy and training to make the model more widely available, with funding from the U.S. federal government's Substance Abuse and Mental Health Services Administration (SAMHSA), an agency within the Department of Health and Human Services.

Although most of the early PACT replicates and adaptations were funded by grants from federal, state/provincial, or local mental health authorities, there has been a growing tendency to fund these services through Medicaid and other publicly supported health insurance plans. Medicaid funding has been used for ACT services throughout the United States, starting in the late 1980s, when Allness left PACT to head Wisconsin's state mental health agency and led the development of ACT operational standards. Since then, U.S. and Canadian standards have been developed, and many states and provinces have used them in the development of ACT services for individuals with psychiatric disabilities who would otherwise be dependent on more costly, less effective alternatives. Even though Medicaid has turned out to be a mixed blessing — it can be difficult to demonstrate a person's eligibility for this insurance program, to meet its documentation and claim requirements, or to find supplemental funding for necessary services it will not cover — Medicaid reimbursement has led to a long-overdue expansion of ACT in previously unserved or underserved jurisdictions.

Public mental health system planners have attempted to resolve the implementation problems associated with replicating the original Madison approach in sparsely populated rural areas or with low-incidence special populations in urban areas. A related issue for planners is to determine the number of ACT or "ACT-like" programs a particular geographical area needs and can support. Some promising areas for further development are identified below in the section on the future of ACT.

== Research on ACT and related program models ==
ACT and its variations are among the most widely and intensively studied intervention approaches in community mental health. The original Madison studies by Stein and Test and their colleagues are classics in the field. Another major contributor to the ACT literature is Gary Bond, who completed several studies at Thresholds in Chicago and later developed a major psychiatric rehabilitation research and training program at Indiana University-Purdue University at Indianapolis. Bond has been particularly influential in the development of fidelity measurement scales for ACT and other evidence-based practices. He and his colleagues (especially Robert E. Drake at Dartmouth Medical School) have attempted to consolidate and harmonize several major currents in this continuously developing area of practice, including:

- the different "styles" of service delivery exemplified by PACT in Madison, Thresholds in Chicago, the Dartmouth model of integrated dual disorders treatment, and other pioneering programs;
- the various modifications of the original ACT approach over the years to maximize its effectiveness with particular service delivery challenges, such as helping consumers to recover from co-occurring psychiatric and substance use disorders or to choose, get, and keep competitive jobs through a supported employment approach called individual placement and support;
- the increasingly well-organized efforts to help consumers take charge of their own wellness management and recovery.

An evidence review conducted by the AcademyHealth policy center in July 2016, examining the impact of housing-related services and supports on the health outcomes of homeless people enrolled in Medicaid, concluded that ACT reduces self-reported psychiatric symptoms, psychiatric hospital stays, and hospital emergency department visits among people with mental illness and substance use diagnoses.

== Acclaim and criticism ==
Because of its long track record of success with high-priority service recipients in a wide variety of geographical and organizational settings — as demonstrated by a large and growing body of rigorous outcome evaluation studies — ACT has been recognized by SAMHSA, NAMI, and the Commission on Accreditation of Rehabilitation Facilities, among other recognized arbiters, as an evidence-based practice worthy of widespread dissemination.

However, the acclaim for assertive community treatment and related service approaches is not universal. For example, Patricia Spindel and Jo Anne Nugent have argued that the main difficulty with the Program of Assertive Community Treatment (PACT) model and some other case management approaches is that there has been no critical analysis of how personally empowering (as opposed to socially controlling) such programs are. These authors have argued that PACT does not meet the criteria for being an empowerment approach for "working with disadvantaged, labelled, and stigmatized people." Furthermore, they assert, PACT does not have a philosophical base that stresses true individual empowerment. There is much literature, they say, questioning the way in which human services are delivered, but this literature is not considered in evaluations of the PACT approach. Spindle and Nugent conclude that "PACT may be little more than a means of transporting the social control and biomedical functions of the hospital or the institution to the community. For a community mental health system which says that it wants a more progressive approach, PACT simply does not fit the bill." Other concerns have arisen out of the harm reduction/Housing First version of the model, as implemented in the late 2010s. Some clinicians and dual diagnosis specialists have voiced concerns that the model creates a safe environment for increased drug use, resulting in more instances of overdose and even death; they are awaiting an empirical study to confirm these suspicions.

Tomi Gomory at Florida State University has also been critical of PACT. He has written: "Advocates of Programs of Assertive Community Treatment (PACT) make numerous claims for this intensive intervention program, including reduced hospitalization, overall cost, and clinical symptomatology, and increased client satisfaction, and vocational and social functioning. However, a reanalysis of the controlled experimental research finds no empirical support for any of these claims." Gomory has asserted that the chief characteristics of PACT are "intensity, assertiveness, or aggressiveness, which may better be identified as coercion. For example, reduced hospitalization in ACT is simply accomplished by having an administrative decision rule not to admit ACT patients into the hospital regardless of symptomatic behavior (the patients are kept and treated in the community) while patients in routine treatment are hospitalized regularly. When this rule is not present the research shows no reduced hospitalization by ACT compared to routine treatment." Madison psychiatrist Ronald J. Diamond has provided support for that position: "The development of Programs for Assertive Community Treatment (PACT), assertive community treatment (ACT) teams and a variety of similar mobile, continuous treatment programs has made it possible to coerce a wide range of behaviors in the community." Gomory has also argued that professional enthusiasm for the medical model is the main driver of PACT expansion, rather than any clear benefit to clients who receive the service.

In the professional journal Psychiatric Services, Test and Stein have replied to Gomory's assertions that PACT is inherently coercive and that the research claiming to support it is scientifically invalid, and Gomory, in turn, has answered their reply. Moser and Bond address coercion and the broader concept of "agency control" (practices in which the treatment team maintains supervisory responsibility over consumers) in a discussion of data from 23 ACT programs. Their review shows that "agency control" varies greatly among different programs; it may be particularly high with patients diagnosed in the schizophrenia spectrum who also have active substance use issues. A widely distributed book co-authored by Gomory has called the public's attention to various treatment failures allegedly caused by therapies described in the book as "coercive," including PACT.

== Future ==
The cost-effectiveness of ACT was relatively easy to demonstrate in the early days, when psychiatric hospital beds were more heavily used than they are now. In the years to come, program planners will have to justify the comparatively high cost of ACT through the continued use of careful admission criteria and rigorous program evaluation. To ensure the best possible service quality on a routine basis, public regulators and payers would also benefit from having fidelity and outcome monitoring tools more easily administered than those currently available.

The defining characteristics of the ACT approach will remain an attractive framework for services to meet the needs of special populations, such as individuals whose psychiatric symptoms get them into trouble with the criminal justice system, refugees from foreign countries who struggle with the added burden of mental illness, and children and adolescents with serious emotional disturbances. One major piece of unfinished business in the mental health field is the discovery that people with serious mental illnesses die an average of 25 years earlier than the general public, often from disorders that are inherently preventable or treatable; this public health disaster is a critical issue for ACT providers and the people they serve.

Another important area for future program design and evaluation is the use of ACT in combination with other established interventions, such as integrated dual disorder treatment for people with co-occurring mental health and substance use diagnoses, supported employment programs, education for concerned family members, and dialectical behavior therapy for individuals diagnosed with borderline personality disorder.

Ironically, the dissemination of separate evidence-based practices, not all of which are easily integrated with each other, has once again made service coordination a pivotal issue in community mental health — as it was during the latter decades of the 20th century, when ACT was created as an antidote to the "nonsystem" of care.

== See also ==
- Deinstitutionalisation
- Mental illness
- Psychiatric rehabilitation
