= Taiping District, Taichung =

District in Taichung, Taiwan

Coordinates: 24°7′7.6″N 120°45′46.2″E

Taiping 太平區
- District
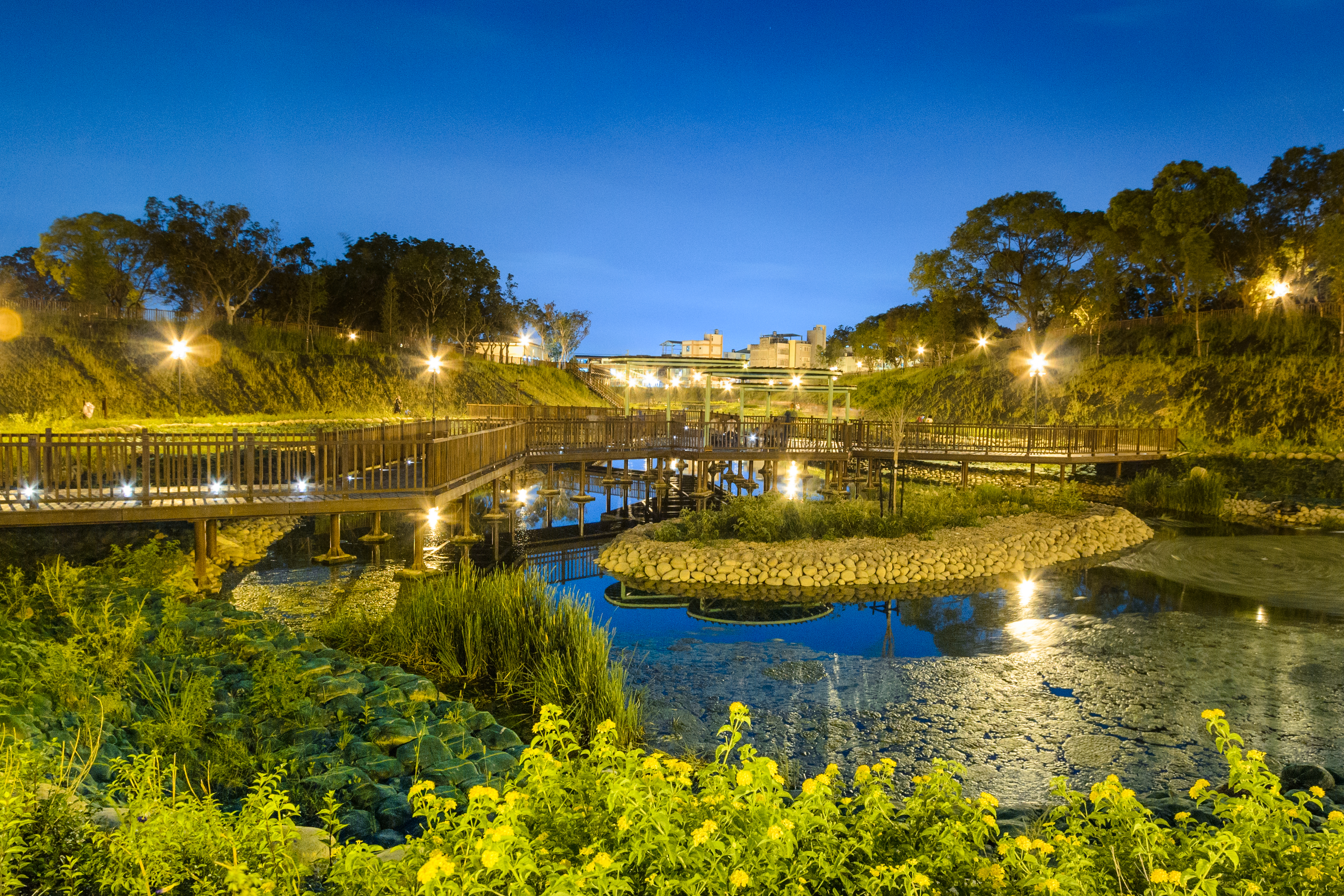

- Taiping District in Taichung City
- Location: Taichung, Taiwan

Area
  - Total: 121 km^{2} (47 sq mi)

Population (December 2024)
  - Total: 200,007
  - Density: 1,650/km^{2} (4,280/sq mi)
- Website: www.taiping.taichung.gov.tw (in Chinese)

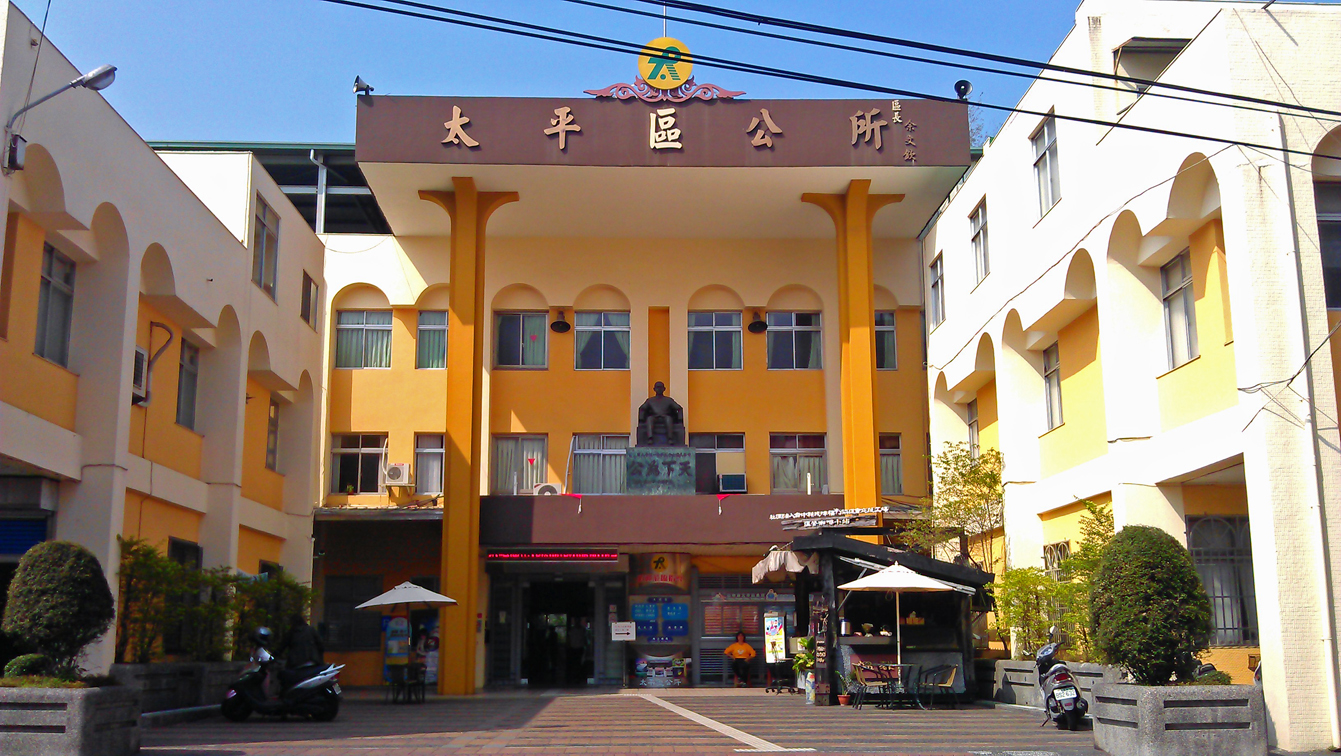
Taiping District Office

Taiping District (Chinese: 太平區; pinyin: Tàipíng Qū) is an inner city district in the eastern part of Taichung, Taiwan. It is the second largest district in Taichung City after Heping District.

== History ==
After the handover of Taiwan from Japan to the Republic of China in 1945, Taiping was organized as a rural township of Taichung County. On 1 August 1996, Taiping was upgraded to a county-administered city due to its population. On 25 December 2010, Taichung County was merged with Taichung City and Taiping was upgraded to a district of the city.

== Administrative divisions ==
Taiping District consists of 39 villages, which are Taiping, Zhangyi, Yongcheng, Zhongping, Zhongzheng, Pingan, Zhongxing, Yongping, Tungping, Chenggong, Tunghe, Jianguo, Jianxing, Pinglin, Daxing, Qinyi, Guanghua, Guangming, Zhongshan, Fengnian, Yixin, Yijia, Yichang, Xinping, Xinji, Xincheng, Xinguang, Xinxing, Xingao, Xinfu, Toubian, Shenghe, Tungbian, Xinglong, Fulong, Huangzhu, Guanglong, Yonglong and Delong Village.

== Geography ==
- Area: 120.75 km^{2}
- Population: 196,564 people (February 2023)

== Economy ==
Taiping District supplies many agricultural products to the Taichung urban area, including loquats, longans, bananas, and vegetables.

== Education ==
- National Chin-Yi University of Technology

== Tourist attractions ==
- Ancient Farm Village Culture Museum
- Bat Tunnel
- Little Cassia Forest
- Public Leisure Park
- Taichung City Tun District Art Center
- Tobiankeng

== Sister cities ==
Lincoln, Nebraska is Taiping's sister city.

== Notable natives ==
- Hsieh Yue-hsia, former actress
