= Lillstreet Art Center =

Coordinates: 41°57′42.4″N 87°40′24.8″W

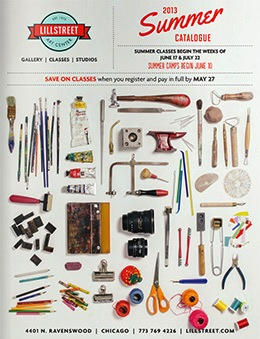
- Lillstreet's 2013 Summer Class Catalogue Cover
- Former name: Lill Street Studios
- Established: 1975
- Location: Chicago, Illinois, US
- Type: Art Center
- Director: Bruce Robbins
- Public transit access: Montrose and Ravenswood stop, Chicago Transit Authority
- Website: www.lillstreet.com

Lillstreet Art Center is an arts center in Chicago, Illinois, United States. It is one of the oldest and most successful multi-faceted art centers in the Chicago area and its facilities include classrooms for arts education, a gallery, an artist residency program, studio spaces, a cafe, and a community outreach program.

== History ==
The center began as a ceramics studio in a renovated horse barn in Chicago on Lill Street in 1975, Founded by Bruce Robbins, owner of Robbins Clay Co and his partner, potter Martin Cohen,. it started as a ceramics studio known as "Lill Street Studios" with 11 members. After 28 years, "Lillstreet Art Center" relocated to a former gear factory on Ravenswood Avenue in 2003, increasing its space from 17,000 to 40,000 sq ft (3,700 m^{2}). The new facility added metalsmithing & jewelry, painting & drawing, printmaking, textiles, glass, and digital arts & photography—as well as a small coffee shop. Lillstreet hosts studios for more than 50 artists, serves more than 1000 students, and has a summer day camp for kids 6–16.

In 2012, a 400-square-foot (37 m^{2}) green roof was installed at the center. Also on the roof are about 20 beehives, with honey for sale in the gallery. In 2025, Lillstreet is celebrating 50 years in business.

in 2026 founder Bruce Robbins sold the business to Samantha Walton.

== Gallery exhibitions ==
Exhibitions at the Lillstreet Art Center have included:

- Reformat: Digital Fabrication in Clay combined traditional ceramic techniques with digital fabrication such as 3D printing and computer-controlled routers.
- Neat: The Art of the Whiskey Vesselwas an exhibit of ceramic bottles, cups, flasks, jugs, and whiskey buckets.
- 100 Acts of Sewing, an exhibit of the fiber artist, Sonya Phillip.
- Graphic Noise: Gig Posters from the Chicago Printers Guild, an exhibit of Chicago-based printmakers.
- Cairn & Cloud: A Collective Expression of Trauma and Hope was created by Corinne Peterson, and composed of clay and porcelain objects made by workshops members dealing with trauma and grief.
- Before I Die…, was an outdoor, chalkboard-based, art exhibit that encouraged passers-by to fill in the open-ended sentence. Originally conceived by artist Candy Chang.
- In the Penal Colony was Philip Glass' adaptation of Kafka's short story, staged by the Chicago Fringe Opera. The chamber opera was performed in the painting and drawing studio.
