= Wenhua Road Night Market =

Night market in West, Chiayi City, Taiwan

Wenhua Road Night Market 文化路夜市
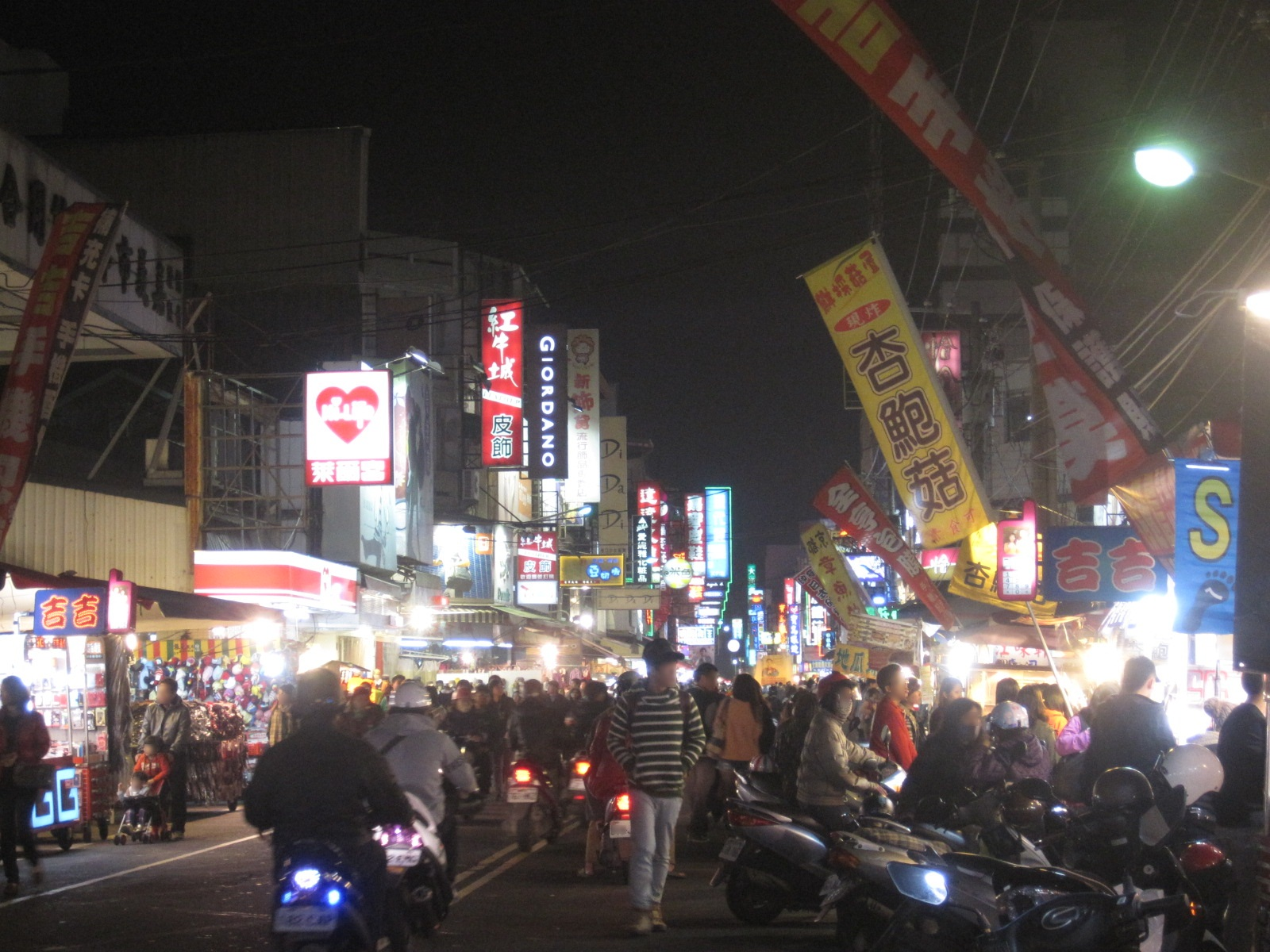
- Location: West, Chiayi City, Taiwan; 23°28′45.2″N 120°26′58.9″E
- Environment: night market
- Interactive map of Wenhua Road Night Market

The Wenhua Road Night Market (Chinese: 文化路夜市; pinyin: Wénhuà Lù Yèshì) is a night market in West District, Chiayi City, Taiwan.

== Architecture ==
The night market stretches along the Wenhua Road for around half a kilometer. The southern section of the road is divided by a central foundation, which acts as a two-lane road during day time and pedestrian zone during night time.

== Features ==
The night market features famous Chiayi snacks and delicacies. Many popular restaurants and traditional dishes can be found along the night market road.

== Transportation ==
The night market is accessible within walking distance east of Chiayi Station of Taiwan Railway, south of Alishan Forest Railway or North of Chiayi BRT Bunhua Rd. intersection Bus stop.

== See also ==
- List of night markets in Taiwan
