= Chia-Le-Fu Night Market =

Night market in West, Chiayi City, Taiwan

Chia-Le-Fu Night Market 嘉樂福夜市
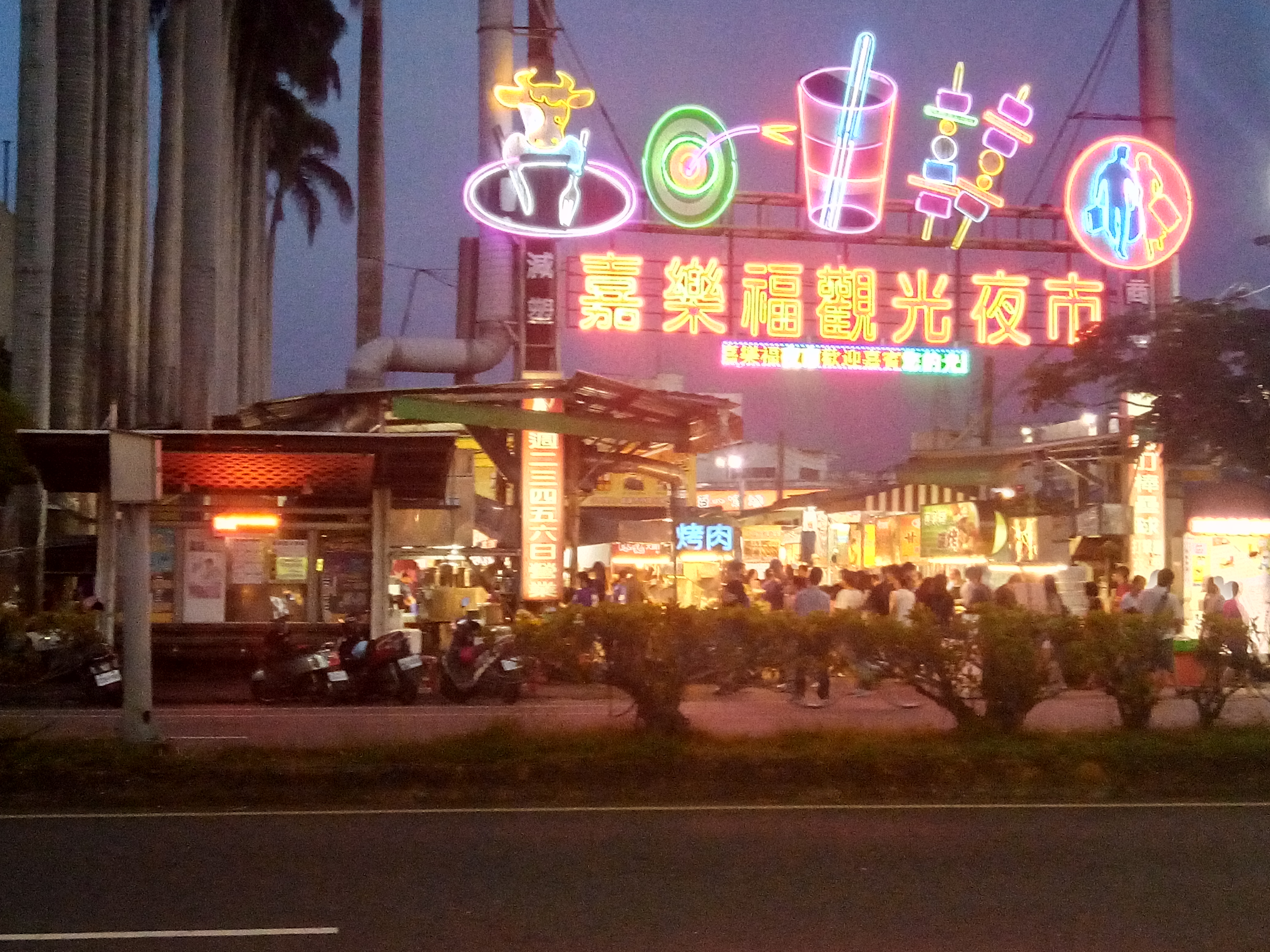
- Location: West, Chiayi City, Taiwan; 23°28′19.1″N 120°25′53.5″E
- Management: Chen Hui-ming
- Environment: night market
- Number of tenants: 300 food stalls
- Total retail floor area: 1,800 m^{2}
- Interactive map of Chia-Le-Fu Night Market

The Chia-Le-Fu Night Market (traditional Chinese: 嘉樂福夜市; simplified Chinese: 嘉乐福夜市; pinyin: Jiālèfú Yèshì) is a night market in West District, Chiayi City, Taiwan.

== History ==
In May 2016, Chiayi City Deputy Mayor Hou Chong-wen promoted the online registration of food sold at the night market in order to raise awareness of food safety and cleanliness.

== Architecture ==
The night market spans over an area of 1,800 m^{2} which consists more than 300 food stalls.

== Transportation ==
The night market is accessible within walking distance south west of Chiayi Station of Taiwan Railway.

== See also ==
- List of night markets in Taiwan
