= West District, Chiayi =

District in Chiayi City, Taiwan

Coordinates: 23.483716°N 120.422317°E

West District 西區
- District
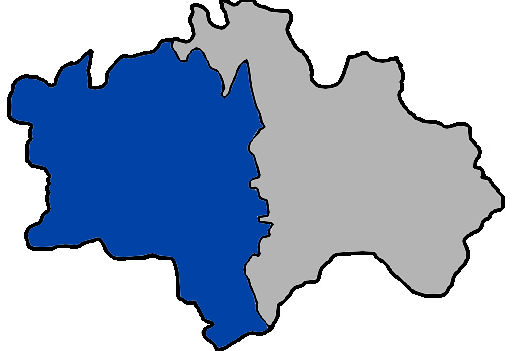
- West District in Chiayi City
- Location: Chiayi City, Taiwan
- Urban villages (里): 45

Government
  - Leader (區長): Ke Guozhen (柯國振)

Area
  - Total: 29.87 km^{2} (11.53 sq mi)

Population (September 2019)
  - Total: 146,905
  - Density: 4,918/km^{2} (12,740/sq mi)
- Time zone: UTC+8 (National Standard Time)
- Postal code: 600
- Website: west.chiayi.gov.tw (in Chinese)

West District (Chinese: 西區; pinyin: Xī Qū; Pe̍h-ōe-jī: Se-khu) is a district in west Chiayi City, Taiwan.

== History ==
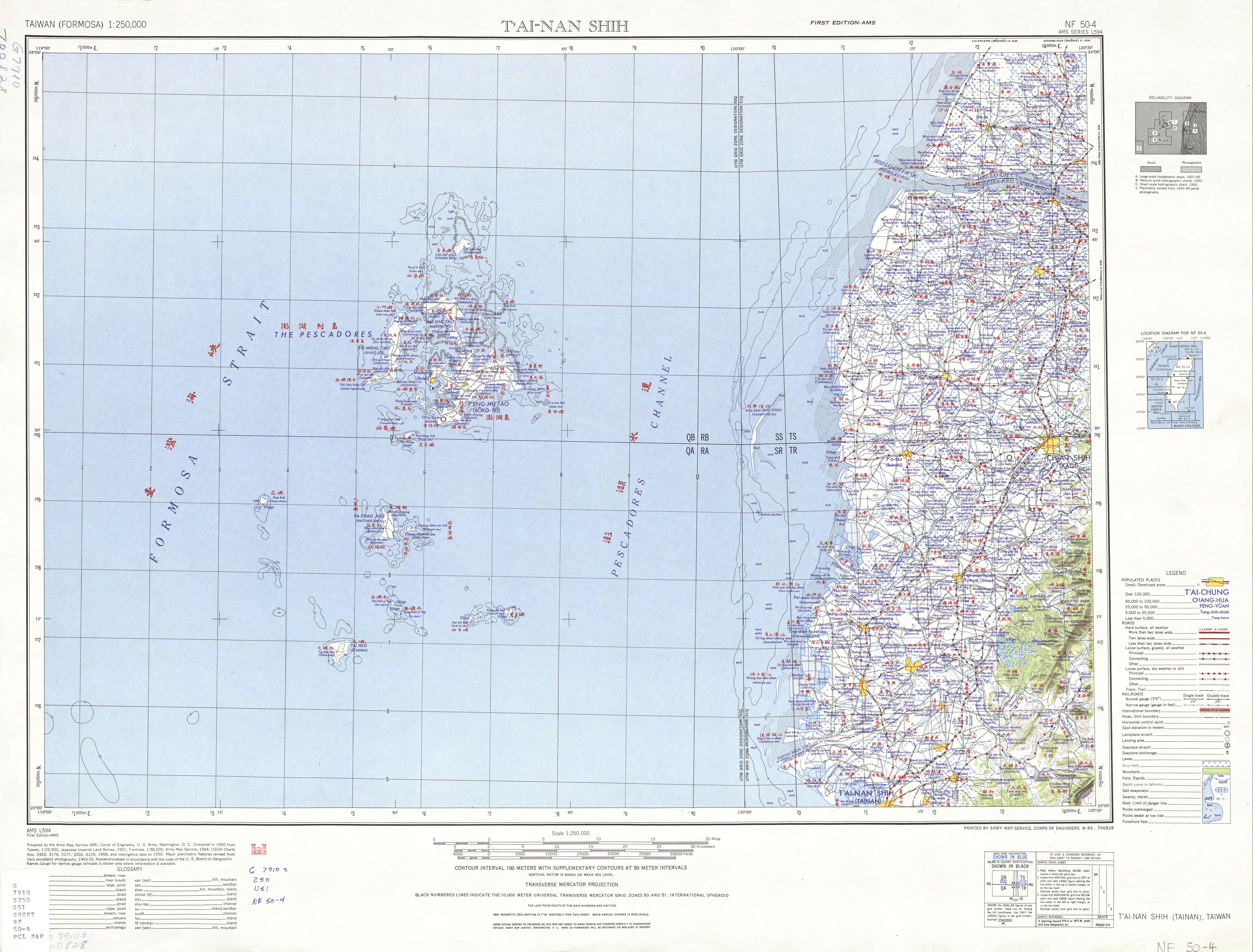
Map of the region including the area of today's West District, Chiayi (1950)

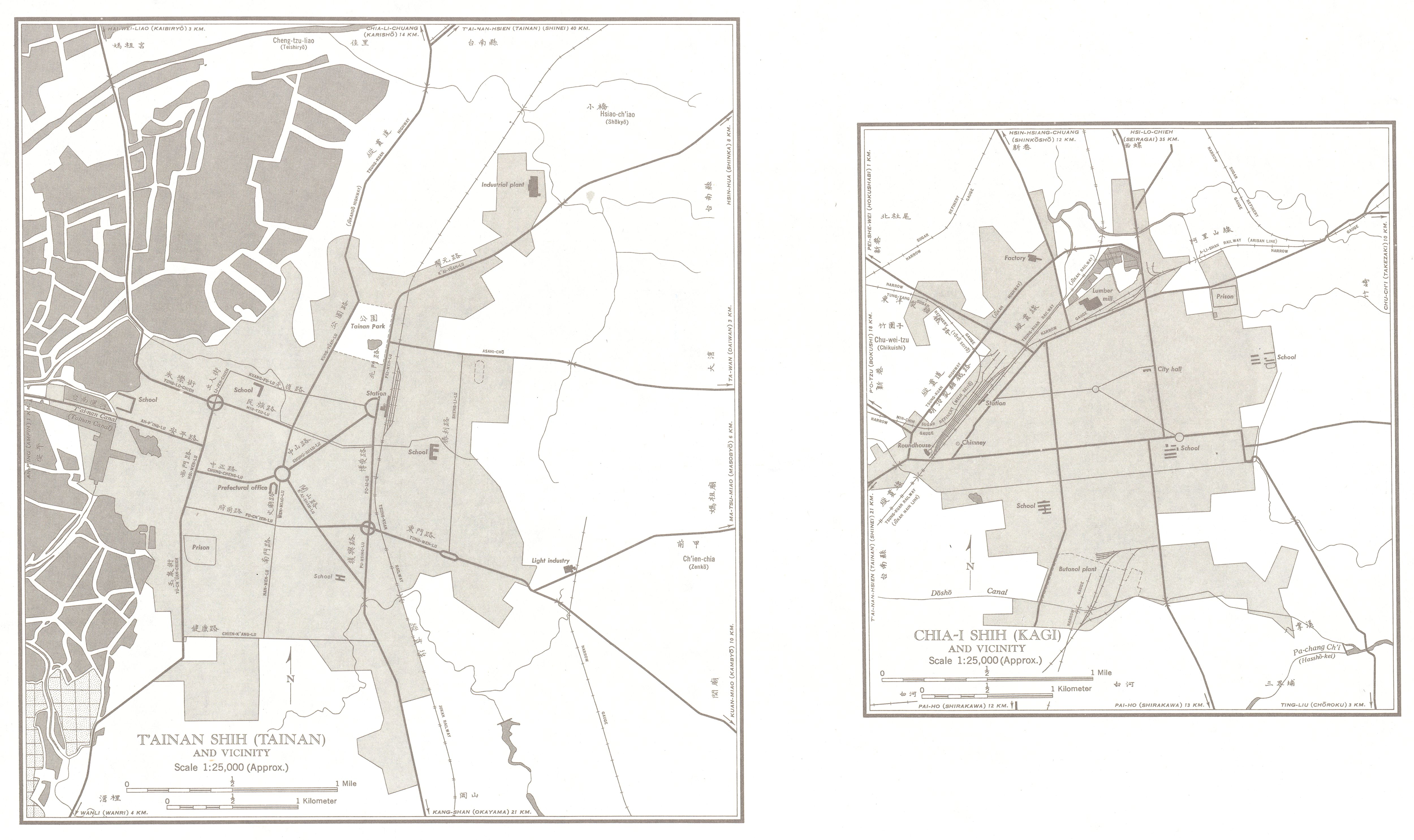
Map of the city including the area of today's West District, Chiayi (1950s)

Chiayi City in 1946–1950

The West District was established on 6 October 1990.

== Administrative divisions ==
Since February 1, 2010, West District has been divided into forty-five urban villages:

- (長榮聯合里)
  - Shuyuan (書院里), Yonghe (永和里), Xinfu (新富里), Wenhua (文化里), Xirong (西榮里), Fanshe (番社里), Guohua (國華里)
- (竹園聯合里)
  - Daxi (大溪里), Zhuanyao (磚磘里), Fuquan (福全里), Fuan (福安里), Xinxi (新西里), Gangping (港坪里), Tougang (頭港里), Xiping (西平里), Liucuo (劉厝里)
- (八掌聯合里)
  - Ziqiang (自強里), Meiyuan (美源里), Hunei (湖內里), Shizi (獅子里), Hongwa (紅瓦里), Guanglu (光路里), Fumin (福民里), Chedian (車店里), Chuiyang (垂楊里), Peiyuan (培元里), Yuying (育英里), Zhiyuan (致遠里), Cuidai (翠岱里), Daoming (導明里)
- (北興聯合里)
  - Beirong (北榮里), Qingan (慶安里), Xianghu (香湖里), Zhongxing (重興里), Houyi (後驛里), Hubian (湖邊里), Zhuwei (竹圍里)
- (北鎮聯合里)
  - Baosheng (保生里), Baoan (保安里), Beixin (北新里), Xincuo (新厝里), Baofu (保福里), Zhucun (竹村里), Beihu (北湖里) and Xiapi (下埤里) Village.

== Government institutions ==
- Chiayi City Council

== Education ==
- National Chiayi University - Sinmin Campus

== Tourist attractions ==
- Art Site of Chiayi Railway Warehouse
- Chiayi Art Museum
- Chiayi Cultural and Creative Industries Park
- Chia-Le-Fu Night Market
- Museum of Old Taiwan Tiles
- Taiwan Hinoki Museum
- Wenhua Road Night Market

== Transportation ==
- TR Chiayi Station

== Notable natives ==
- Vincent Siew, Vice President (2008-2012)

== See also ==
- Chiayi City
