= Care Programme Approach =

UK community mental health services system

Care Programme Approach (CPA) in the United Kingdom is a system of delivering community mental health services to individuals diagnosed with a mental illness. It was introduced in England in 1991 and by 1996 become a key component of the mental health system in England. The approach requires that health and social services assess need, provided a written care plan, allocate a care coordinator, and then regularly review the plan with key stakeholders, in keeping with the National Health Service and Community Care Act 1990.

== History and impact ==
In 1999 the approach was simplified to standard and enhanced levels, the term key worker was changed to care coordinator, and there was an emphasis on risk management, employment and leisure, and the needs of the carer.

There is some criticism that the approach has changed the role of staff away from implementing clinical interventions into administrative tasks, that the policy is carried out inconsistently, and has not been well aligned to clinical models of case management. Formal review on the impact and effectiveness of this initiative has been difficult because of the variation of clinical interventions given under a CPA model.

=== CPA in a prison setting ===
A research paper by M. Georgiou and J. Jethwa discusses the purpose of the CPA model and discusses key themes in its benefits and shortcomings, in order to provide a more organized framework for care of inmates in a prison setting. The key themes are listed below.

==== Objectives of CPA ====
- Interagency collaboration
- Catering to the complex needs of the patient
- Ongoing care (upon release from prison)
- Patient involvement in CPA, centered around them

==== Challenges faced when implementing CPA ====
- Responsibilities are not clear
- Geographically deprived for program outreach
- Patient has little or no awareness of CPA
- Lack of understanding CPA process
- Prison capacity to implement program (e.g., too many cases, not enough resources, patient dropout from CPA)

== See also ==
- Case management
- Care in the community
- Deinstitutionalisation
