= Chiayi Cultural and Creative Industries Park =

Multipurpose park in West, Chiayi City, Taiwan

- 嘉義文創園區
- G9 Creative Park

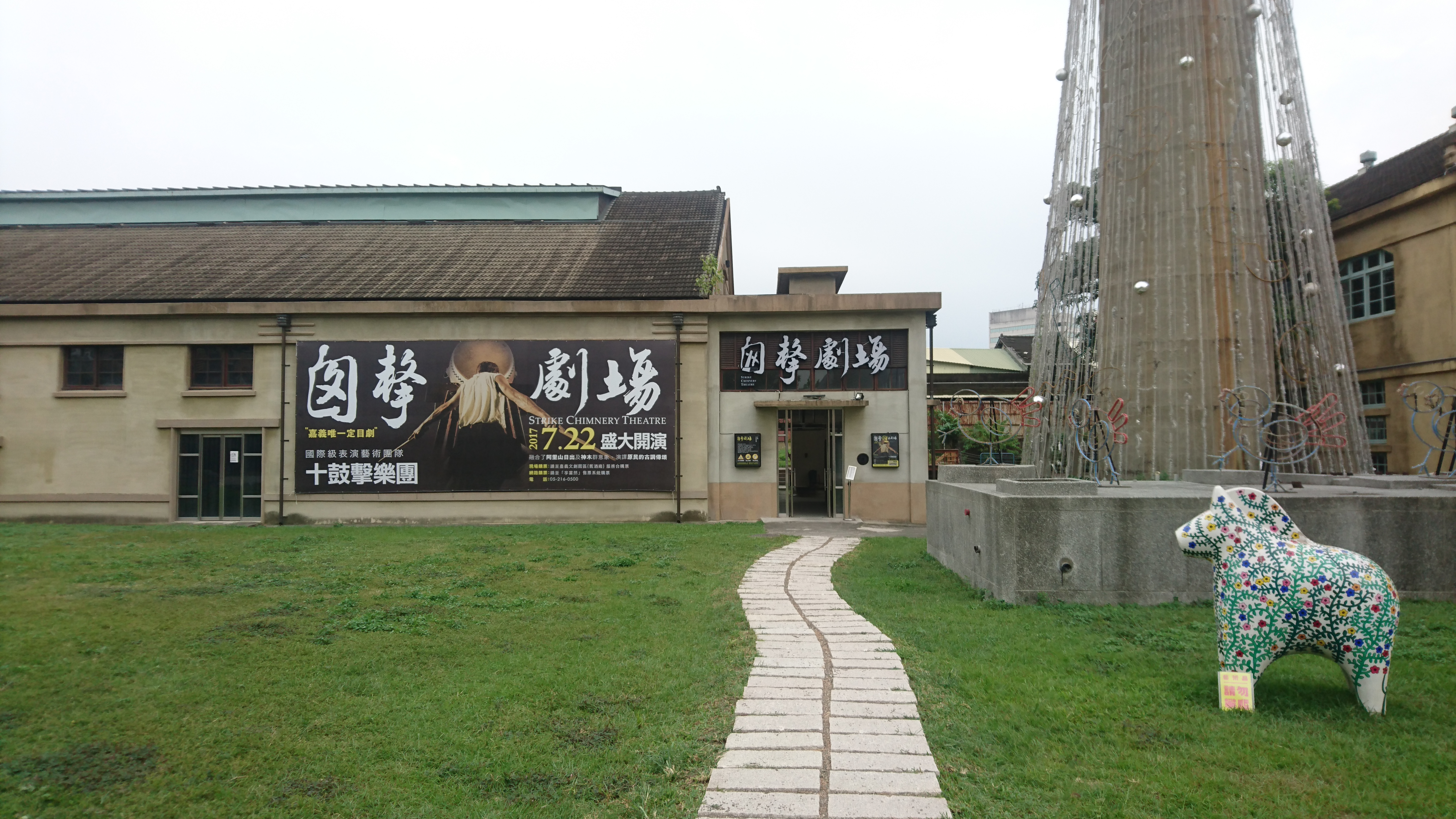
- Interactive map of Chiayi Cultural and Creative Industries Park
- Location: West, Chiayi City, Taiwan
- Coordinates: 23°28′36.4″N 120°26′23.1″E
- Type: art center

Construction
- Opened: 2003

Website
- Official website (in Chinese)

The Chiayi Cultural and Creative Industries Park (traditional Chinese: 嘉義文創園區; simplified Chinese: 嘉义文创园区; pinyin: Jiāyì Wénchuàng Yuánqū) or G9 Creative Park is a multi-purpose park in West District, Chiayi City, Taiwan.

== History ==
The area was originally opened in 1916 as Chiayi Brewery by the Japanese government. In 1922, the brewery company went public. In the 1970s, local people began referring the brewery as Chiayi Old Distillery (traditional Chinese: 嘉義舊酒廠; simplified Chinese: 嘉义旧酒厂). It operated until 1999 when the Jiji earthquake destroyed the brewery chimney from 53 meters high to just 18 meters. Soon later it was then converted into the Chiayi Cultural and Creative Industries Park and was opened in 2003. On 11 January 2016, the park underwent three-year major renovation by the Ministry of Culture.

== Architecture ==
The park consists of 21 buildings.

== Transportation ==
The park is accessible within walking distance south west from Chiayi Station of Taiwan Railway.

== See also ==
- List of tourist attractions in Taiwan
