= Museum of Old Taiwan Tiles =

Museum in West, Chiayi City, Taiwan

- 台灣花磚博物館
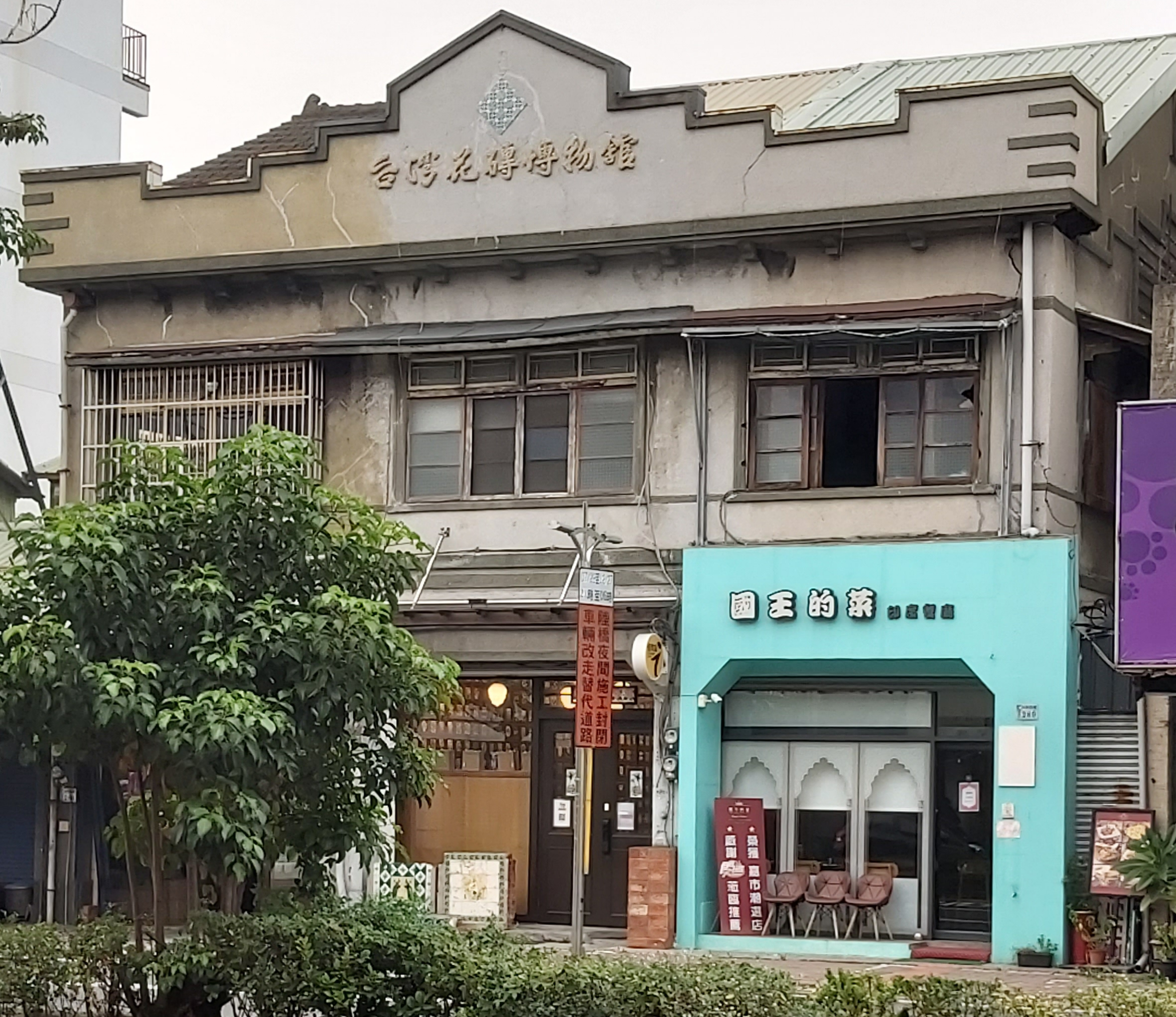
- Location: West, Chiayi City, Taiwan
- Coordinates: 23°28′59.9″N 120°26′45.9″E
- Type: art museum
- Operator: James Hsu
- Website: Official website (in Chinese)

The Museum of Old Taiwan Tiles (traditional Chinese: 台灣花磚博物館; simplified Chinese: 台湾花砖博物馆; pinyin: Táiwān Huāzhuān Bówùguǎn) is an art museum in West District, Chiayi City, Taiwan.

== History ==
The museum building used to be a timber storage building during the Japanese rule of Taiwan. The museum founder James Hsu and his friends collected resources to purchase and renovate the building in 2015. In the same year, the museum building received subsidies for renovation from Chiayi City Government.

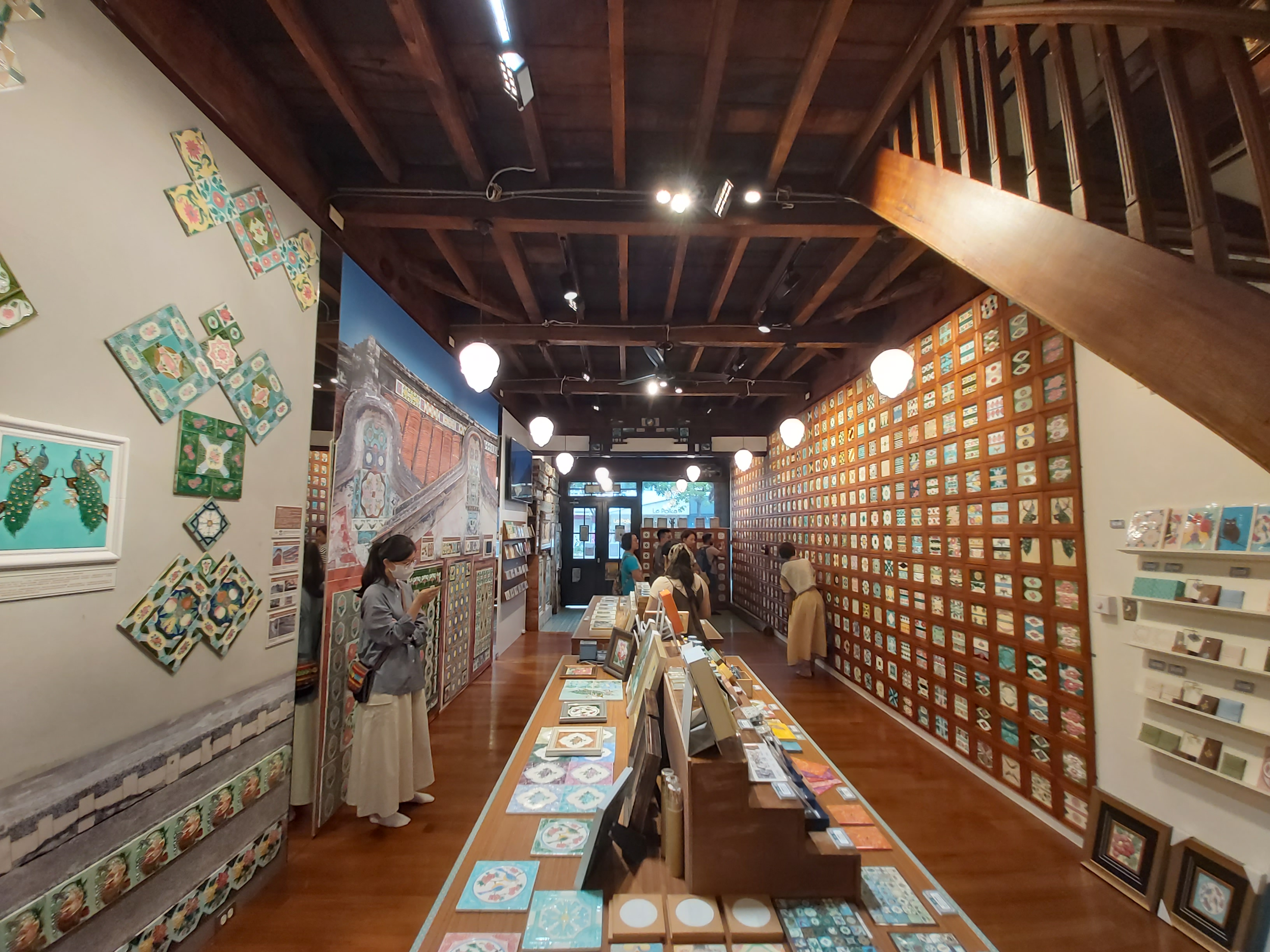
1F Interior

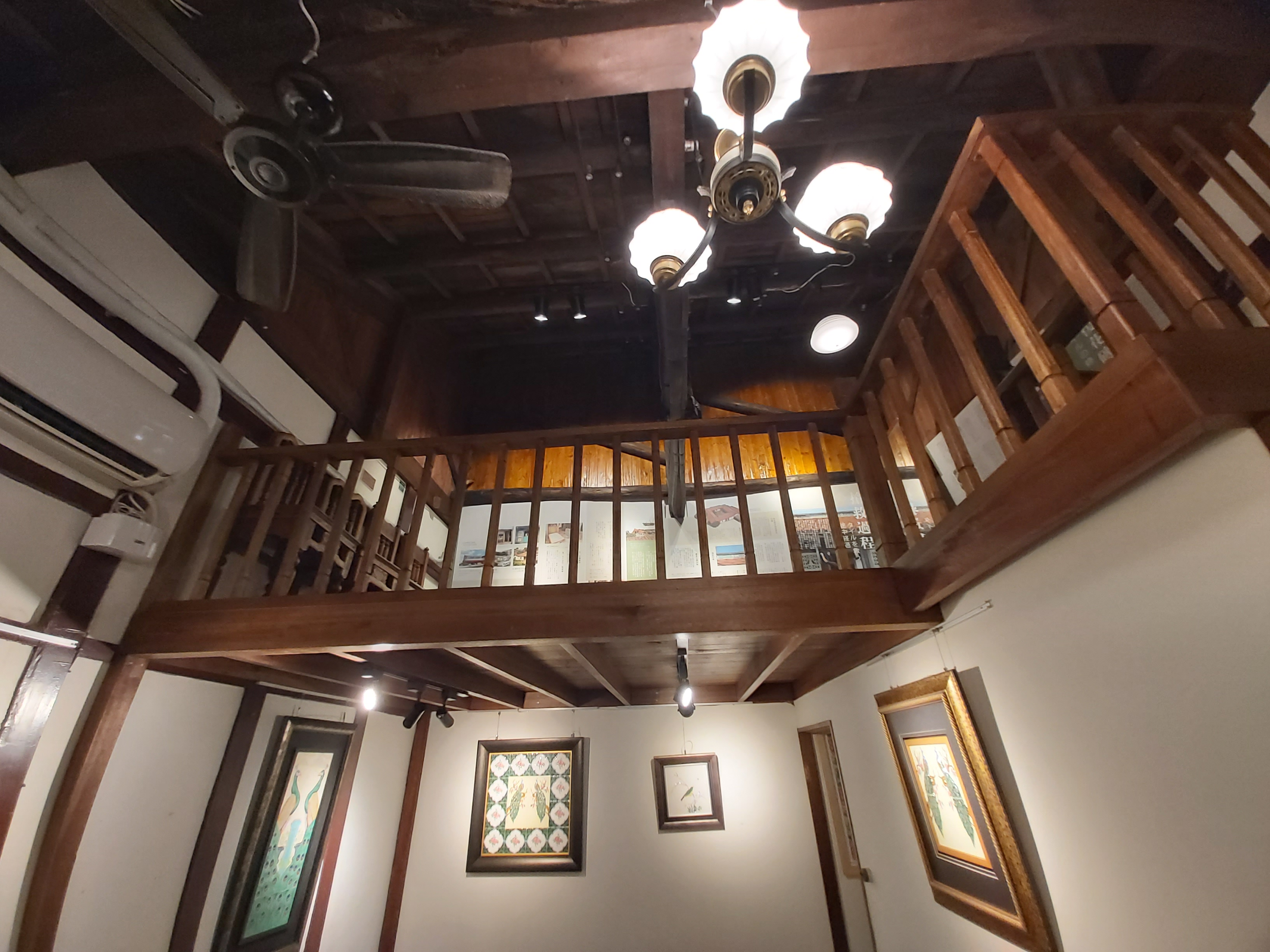
2F Interior

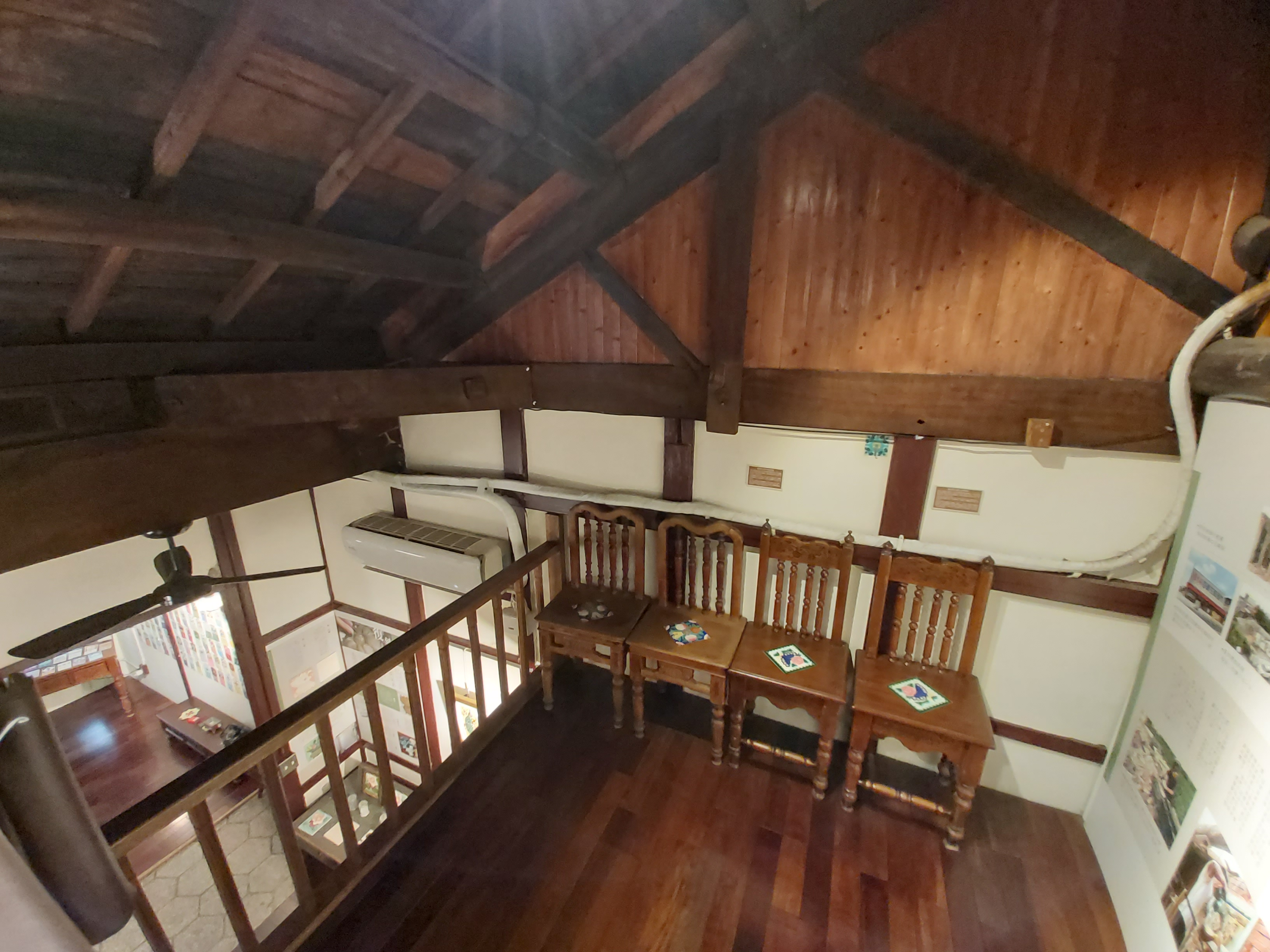
3F Interior

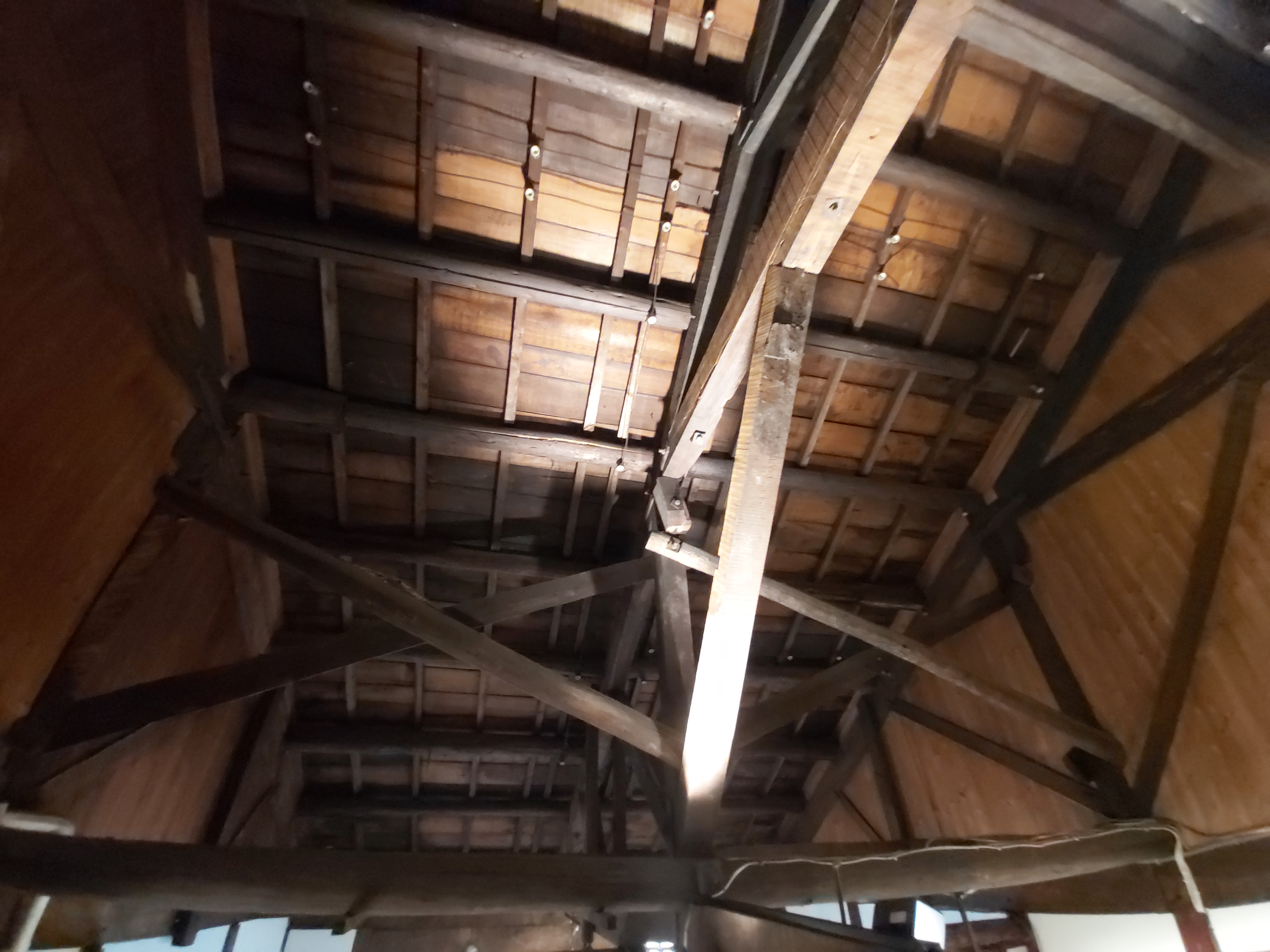
Ceiling

== Exhibitions ==
The museum exhibits more than 4,000 pieces of classical style of tiles, especially from the year 1915–1935.

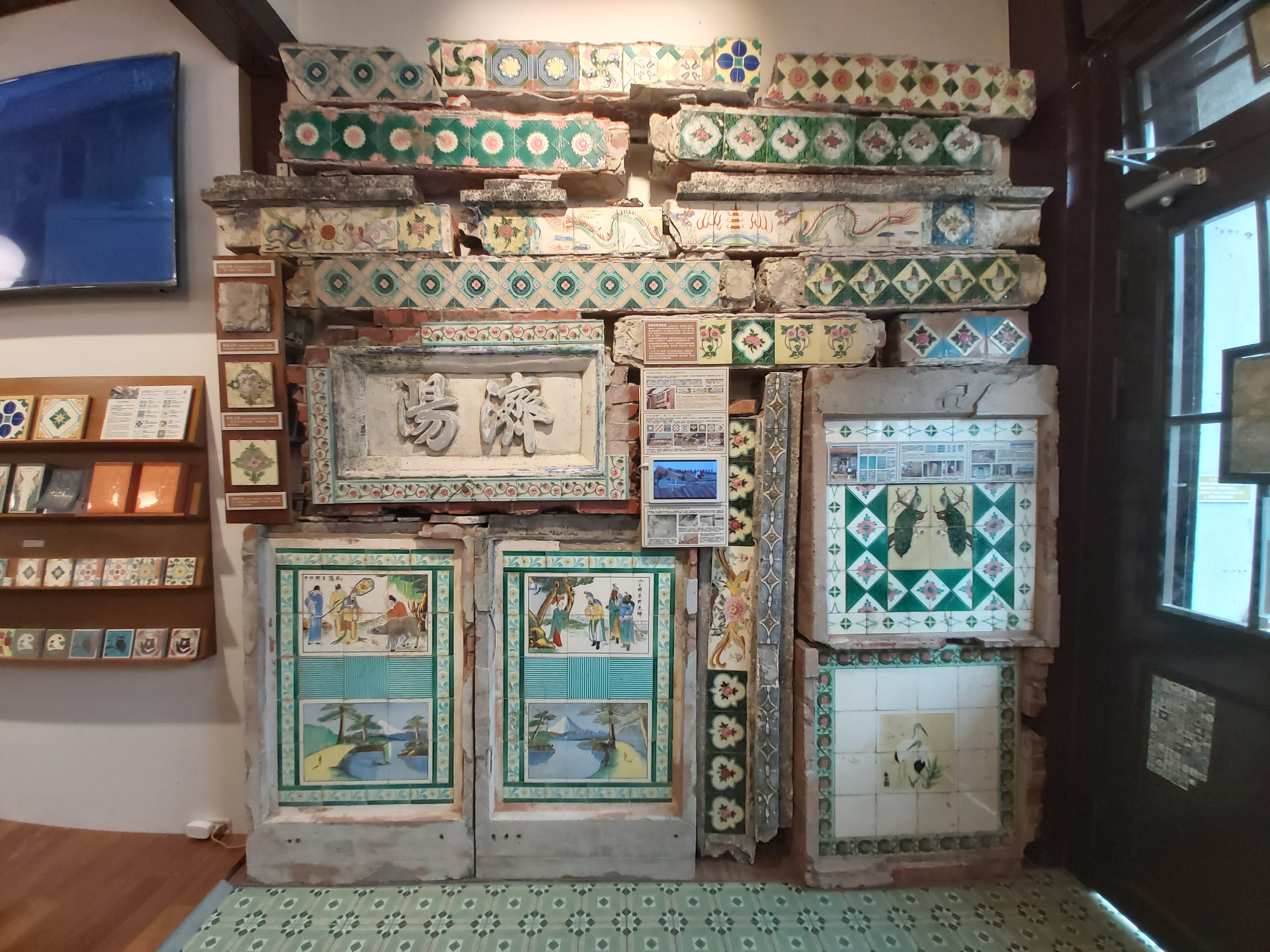
Classical style tiles Exhibitions

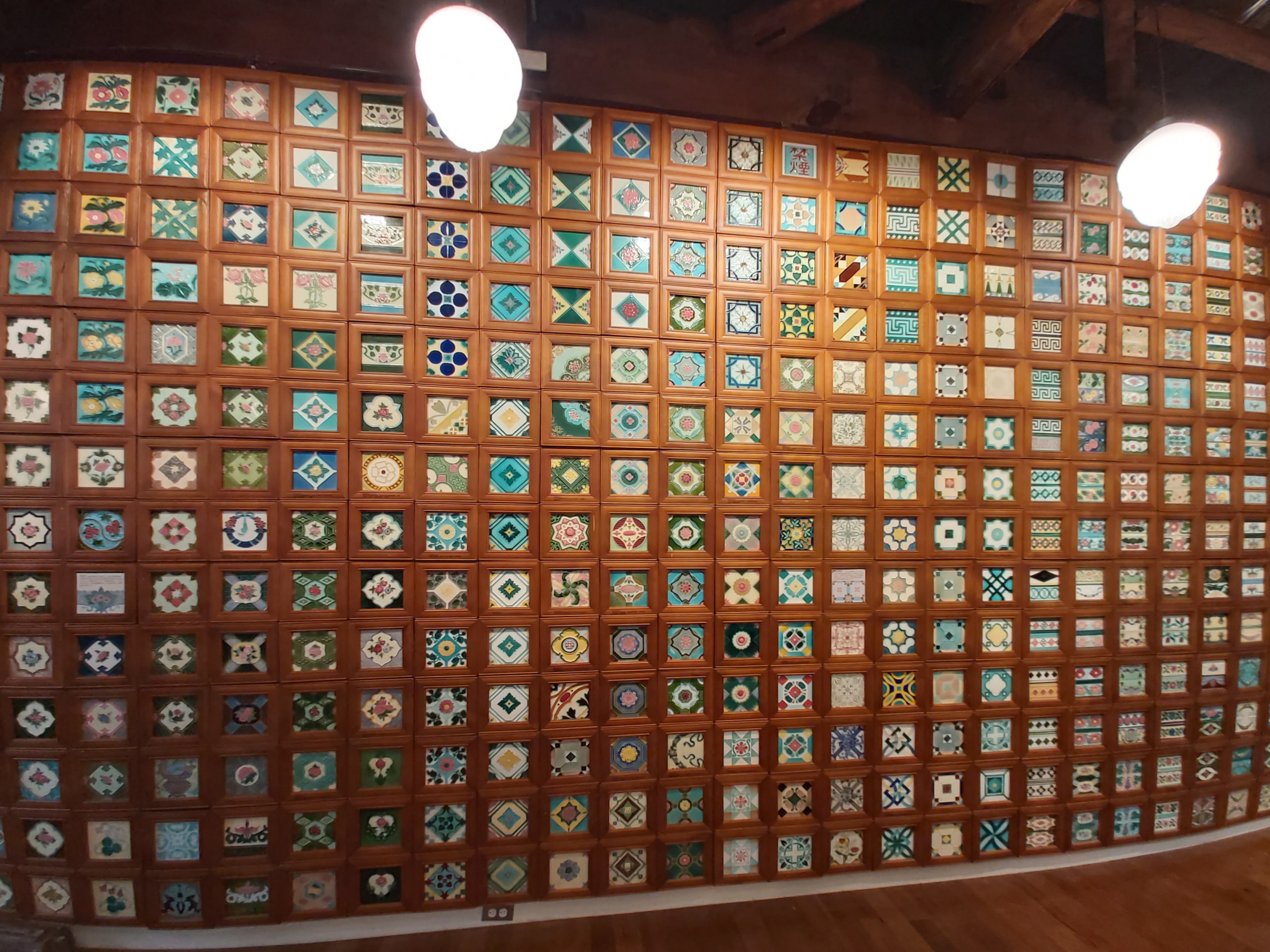
Wall of classical style tiles

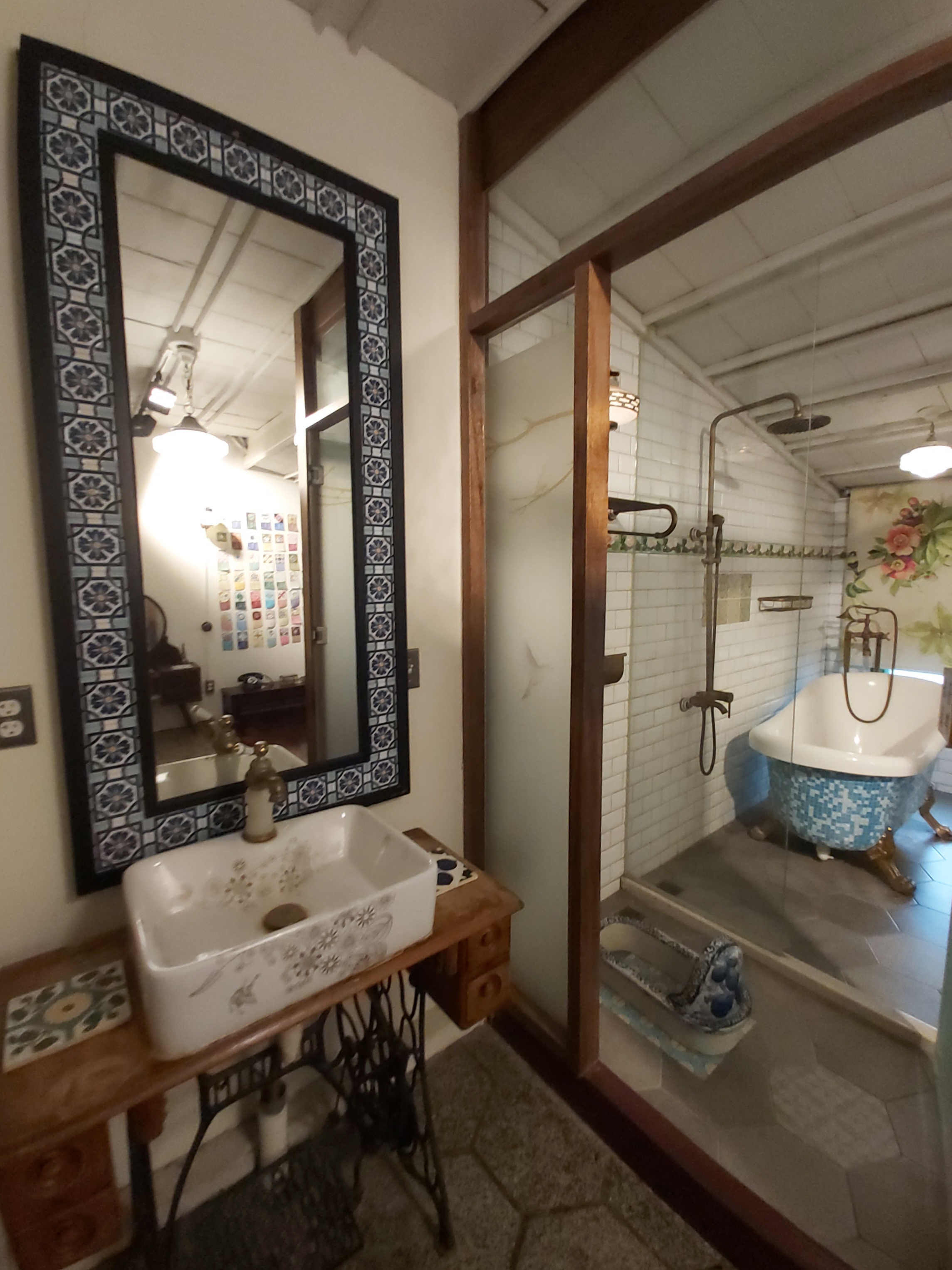
Washroom by the classical style tiles

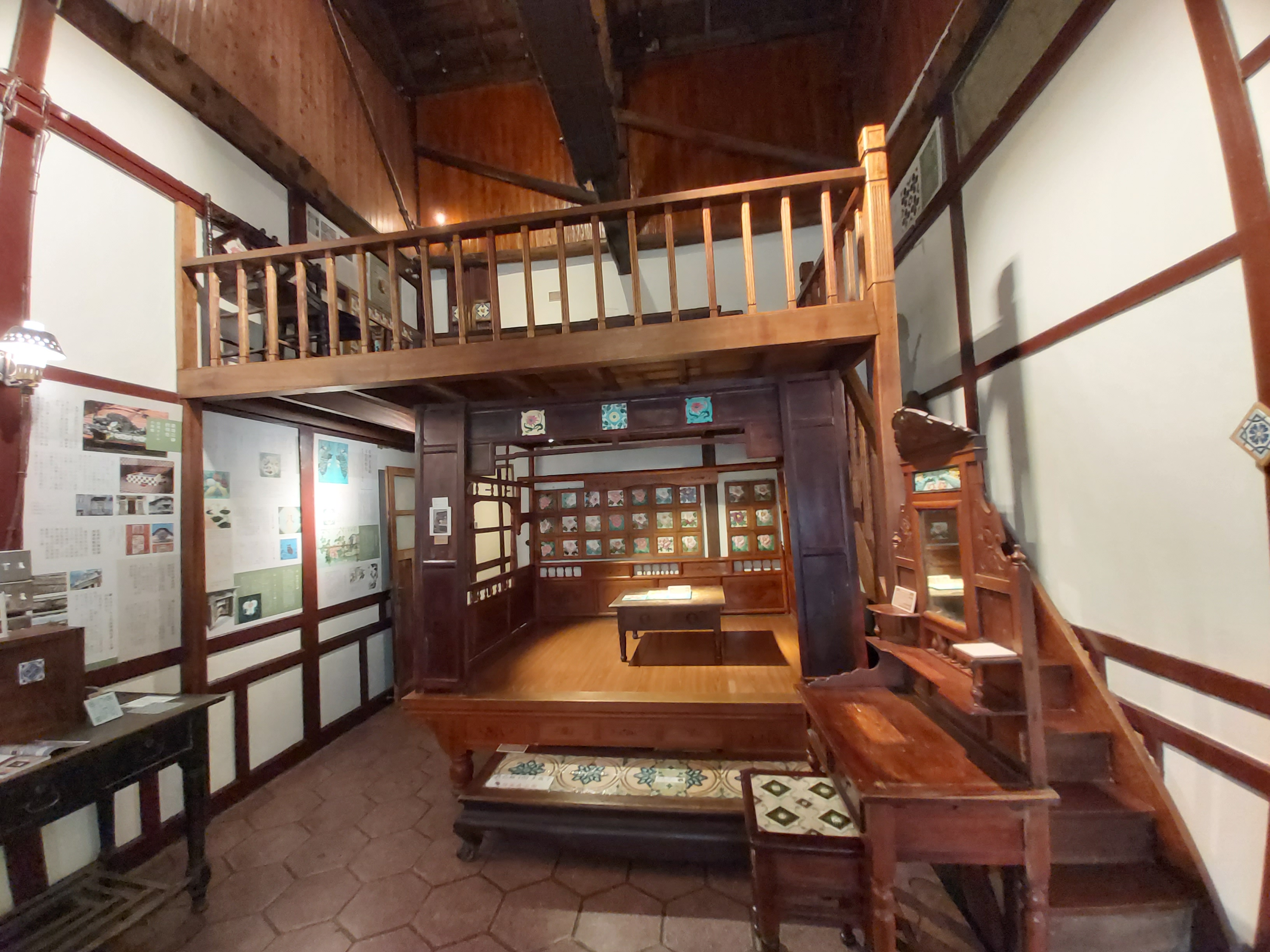
Furniture

== Transportation ==
The museum is accessible within walking distance northeast of Chiayi Station of Taiwan Railway.

== See also ==
- List of museums in Taiwan
