= Chiayi Art Museum =

Museum in West, Chiayi City, Taiwan

- 嘉義市立美術館

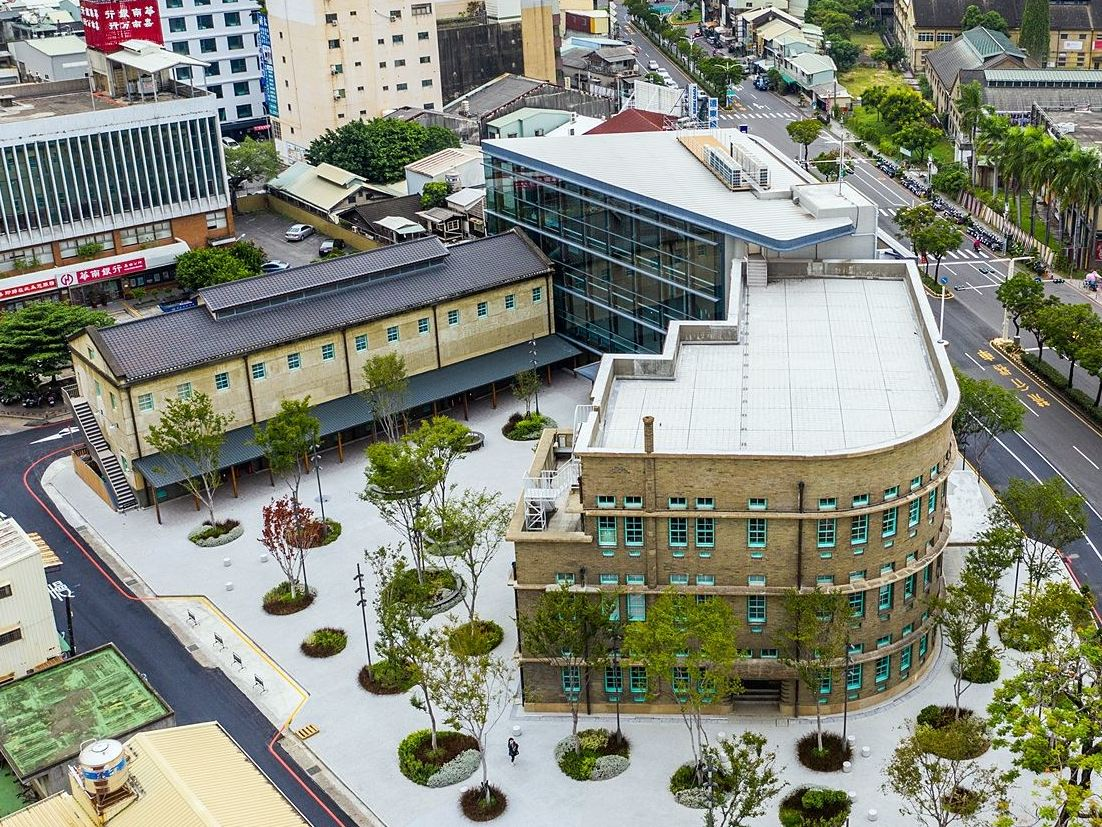
- Established: November 2020; 5 years ago
- Location: West, Chiayi City, Taiwan
- Coordinates: 23°28′37.2″N 120°26′26.5″E
- Type: art museum
- Director: Chia-Chi CHEN
- Architects: M.H.Wang Architects and Associates, Studiobase Architects
- Public transit access: Chiayi Station
- Website: Official website

The Chiayi Art Museum (traditional Chinese: 嘉義市立美術館; simplified Chinese: 嘉义市立美术馆; pinyin: Jiāyì Shìlì Měishùguǎn) is an art museum in West District, Chiayi City, Taiwan.

== History ==
The museum building was originally constructed in 1936 as a factory of the Chiayi branch of Taiwan Tobacco and Wine Monopoly Bureau during the Japanese rule of Taiwan. In November 2020, it was reopened as Chiayi Art Museum in an inaugurated ceremony by Mayor Huang Min-hui. On 27 January 2021, Eslite Bookstore opened a bookshop at the museum. The current director of the museum is Chia-Chi CHEN.

== Architecture ==
The historical building of the Chiayi Art Museum at night

The museum original factory building consisted of a main building and two warehouses. After it was turned into a museum, it consists of art spaces, library, shop, restaurant and garden. The museum was designed by M.H.Wang Architects and Associates and Studiobase Architects. It has a total floor area of 5,179 m^{2}.

== Transportation ==
The museum is accessible within walking distance south of Chiayi Station of Taiwan Railway.

== See also ==
- List of museums in Taiwan
