= Ravenswood, Chicago =

Ravenswood
- Neighborhood
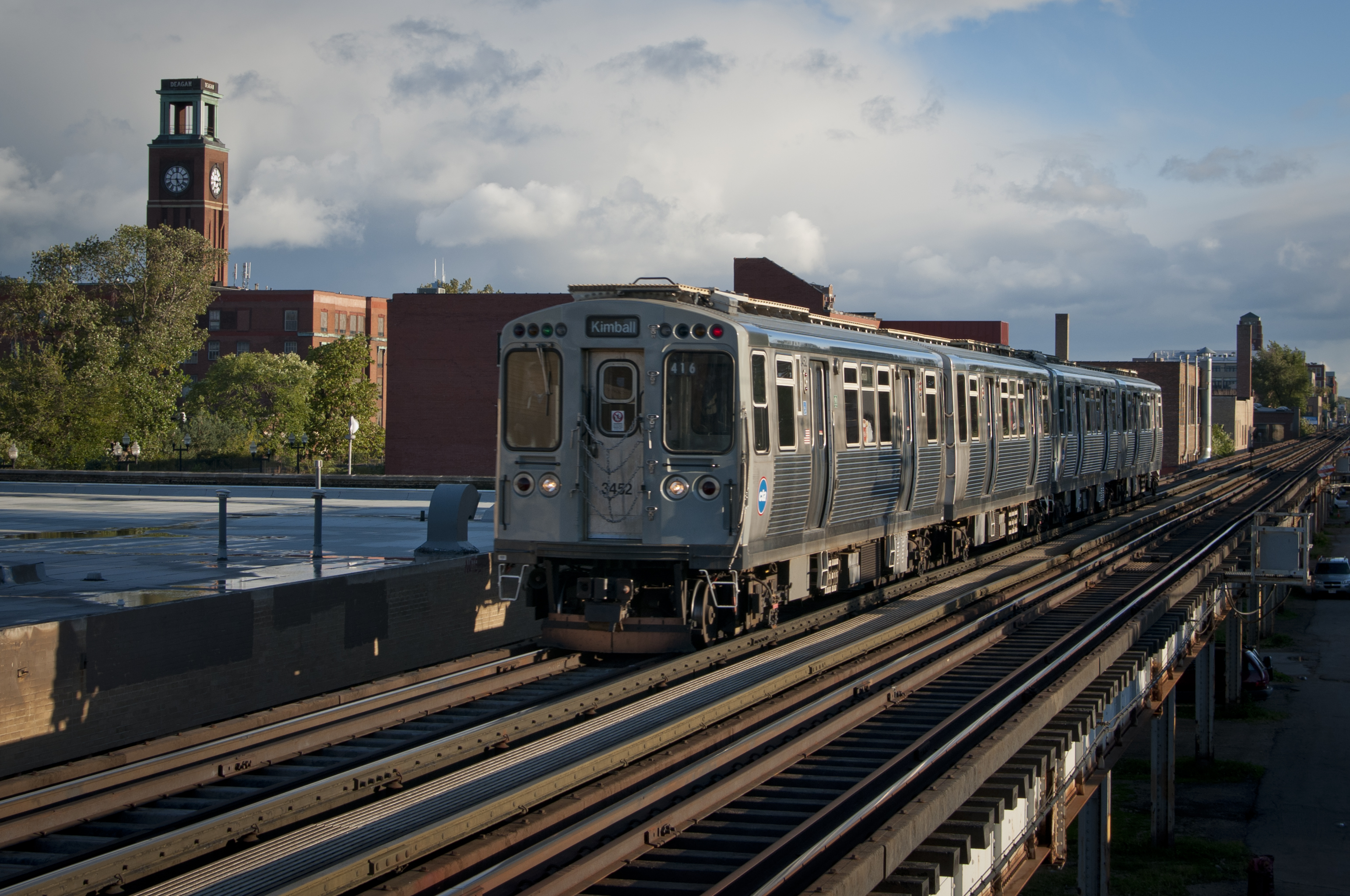
- A Chicago 'L' train passes through Ravenswood with the tower of the former J.C. Deagan Company factory in the background.
- Interactive map of Ravenswood
- Coordinates: 41°57′56″N 87°40′00″W
- Country: United States
- State: Illinois
- County: Cook
- Elevation: 604 ft (184 m)
- ZIP Code: 60640 and part of 60613 and 60625
- GNIS feature ID: 1802408

Ravenswood is a neighborhood located on the North Side of the city of Chicago, Illinois. Lacking designation as one of Chicago's 77 well-defined community areas, it is mostly situated in the Uptown community area, with the portion west of Ravenswood Avenue and the Chicago & Northwestern/Union Pacific North Line railroad tracks being situated in the Lincoln Square community area.

Ravenswood was founded in 1868 as an exclusive commuter suburb by a group of real-estate speculators. These speculators formed the Ravenswood Land Company and purchased 194 acres of farmland and woods eight miles north of Chicago. Based on subdivision plats recorded between 1868 and July 15, 1889, the development extended roughly between Damen Avenue on the west, Berteau Avenue on the south, Clark Street on the east, and Ainslie Avenue on the north. Though local legend claims the woods supported a population of ravens, the species was rarely recorded in Illinois during the nineteenth century. Jennie Van Allen, daughter of the first permanent settler of Ravenswood, later recalled that the name was chosen because a member of the Ravenswood Land Company had "once lived in a town of that name in the East.”

== Society and culture ==
- Lillstreet Art Center
- Thresholds - social program provider
- Chicago Glass Collective - artist collective
- Ravenswood ArtWalk: Tour of Arts & Industry - arts festival
- Malt Row - craft brewing district
- Ravenswood On Tap Craft Beer & Music Fest - beer and music festival
- Ravenswood Sculpture Garden

== Education ==
Residents in Ravenswood are zoned to the campuses of the Chicago Public Schools:

- Ravenswood Elementary School (PK-8)
  - Ravenswood Elementary was established in 1873 as Sulzer Street School; Sulzer Street was later renamed Montrose Avenue. The school adopted its current name in 1893, when 12 classrooms were added to the building. In 1912 and 1913 wings on the north and south sides of the building, consisting of 12 rooms, were built. The school received additional land in 1923; this land was acquired by CPS in 1910. From 1912 to a period in the 1930s, junior high school level students attended classes at Stockton School instead of Ravenswood School, and in turn first year students (freshmen) from Lake View High School, which was overcrowded, attended classes at the Ravenswood building. As of 2016 Ravenswood Elementary has 500 students.
- James B. McPherson Elementary School (PK-8)
- German International School Chicago
- Chicago Montessori
- Those west of Ashland are zoned to Amundsen High School while others are zoned to Senn High School
