= Case management (mental health) =

Specific approach for the coordination of community mental health services

Case management is the coordination of community-based services by a professional or team to provide quality mental health care customized accordingly to individual patients' setbacks or persistent challenges and aid them to their recovery. Case management seeks to reduce hospitalizations and support individuals' recovery through an approach that considers each person's overall biopsychosocial needs without making disadvantageous economic costs. As a result, care coordination includes traditional mental health services but may also encompass primary healthcare, housing, transportation, employment, social relationships, and community participation. In the 1940s, this was known as social counseling. It is the link between the client and care delivery system.

== Development ==
The case management model developed in the US was a response to the closure of large psychiatric hospitals (known as deinstitutionalisation) and initially for provision of services which enhances the quality of life without the need for direct patient care or contact. Clinical or therapeutic case management then developed as the need for the mental health professional to establish a therapeutic relationship and be actively involved in clinical care, often in this only the personal and interpersonal resources are utilized. The process involved can be cyclical because of its client-centered nature. According to the American Association on Mental Retardation (1994) "Case Management (service coordination) is an ongoing process that consists of the assessment of wants and needs, planning, locating and securing supports and services, monitoring and follow-along. The individual or family is the defining force of this service coordination process."

A more active form of case management is present in assertive community treatment (or intensive case management, if the services go beyond the scope of time), this provides an approach in psychiatric case management with coordinated services that promote increased wellness for the management's (homes or agencies) population. This form of management is often a part of managed care systems and falls in legal trouble for coerced care, others include health maintenance organizations, point-of-service plans, and preferred provider arrangements. These managed care services utilise case management as a system to allocate lower-cost service options instead of higher-cost ones, such as outpatient therapy as an alternative to hospitalisation, this limits clients access to services and boxes the overall care to its limits. An alternative approach is personalization, where people with the capacity to exercise choice shape their own lives and the services they receive, empowering them by moving away from traditional practices that may perpetuate dependency and limited choice.

== Functions ==
Case management is about engaging the clients in a process, not processing clients, and the point of service is accountability. Hence, Rose and Moore in 1995 defined the following as case management functions:

1. Outreach or identification of clients
2. Assessment of individual needs
3. Service or Care planning
4. Plan implementation
5. Progress monitoring
6. Regular review and Termination

In cases when re-assessment might identify more than one needs and they are required to be delivered, a new case management cycle is initiated. Cause of the new cycles initiated it is often critiqued that case management leads to dependence rather than independence.

The case manager becomes an effective facilitator or enabler by use of self, understanding the social systems, the etiology of needs, and functioning of the clients. Moore in 1990s said that a case manager should possess the clinical skills of a psychotherapist and the advocacy skills of a community organizer. A client record is maintained by the case manager for effective delivery of services per agency policy. Newer forms of record keeping involve using checklist and scan sheets for decentralized and statistical outcome management.

== Models ==
Several models of case management emerged to coordinate care for individuals with different assessment and re-assessments involved. These models differ in their approach to care, frequency of contact, the number of professionals and referrals involved. In addition, outcome evaluation is typically used to assess the effectiveness of treatment interventions. Researchers have developed fidelity measures to assess the implementation of a particular case management model.

A 2010 review shows the following similarities and differences in different models of case management with regards to the way they operate:

Model	Developed	Focus	Case manager(s)	Client(s)	Fidelity measure(s)
Broker case management	?	Connect client to services	Individual/Individual with optional assistant/Team	Individual/Group	?
Clinical Case Management	?	Involve case manager in treatment	Individual	Individual	?
Strengths based case management / Personal Empowerment Model	1980s	Client abilities and interests	Individual	Individual	Strengths Model Fidelity Scale
Rehabilitation case management	Boston University Psychiatric Rehabilitation Center	Client goals, disability rehabilitation plan	Individual	Individual	?
Assertive Community Treatment	1970s by Marx, Test, and Stein	Reduce hospitalizations	Continuous care team, 10–12 multidisciplinary personnel with shared caseloads	Individual	Dartmouth ACT Scale; Tool for Measurement of ACT
Intensive Case Management	?	Reduce hospital and emergency service use through assertive outreach.	Individual	Individual	?

=== Effectiveness of managed care models ===
A systematic review investigated the effects of intensive case management for patients with severe mental illness:

Intensive case management versus standard care
Summary
Based on evidence of variable quality, ICM is effective in helping many outcomes relevant to people with severe mental illness. Compared to standard care, ICM may reduce hospitalization and increase retention in care. It also globally improved people's functioning socially, but ICM's effect on mental state and quality of life remains unclear.

Outcome	Findings in words	Findings in numbers	Quality of evidence
Service use
Average number of days in hospital per month Follow up: by about 24 months	On average, people receiving intensive case managing spent about 1 day less in hospital per month compared with people receiving standard care. There was a clear difference between the groups. This finding is based on data of low quality.	MD 0.86 lower (1.37 lower to 0.34 lower)	Low
Adverse event: Death
Suicide; Follow up: by 'long' term	Intensive case management may very slightly reduce the chance of suicide but there the difference between people given intensive case management and those receiving standard care for severe mental illness was not clear. These findings are based on data of low quality.	RR 0.68 (0.31 to 1.51)	Low
Global state
Leaving the study early Follow up: by 'long' term	Intensive case management may reduce the chance of loss to follow up when compared with standard care for severe mental illness. Data are based on low quality evidence.	RR 0.68 (0.58 to 0.79)	Low
Social functioning
Employment status - not employed at the end of the trial Follow up: by 'long' term	Intensive case management may reduce unemployment, but, at present it is not possible to be really confident about this outcome. Data supporting this finding are very limited.	RR 0.7 (0.49 to 1)	Very low
	No study reported any usable data on outcomes such as relapse and information relating to mental state		

== See also ==
- Assertive community treatment
- Care in the community
- Care programme approach
- Clinical formulation
- Clinical pathway
- Convention on the Rights of Persons with Disabilities
- Incentive based managed care services
- Medical case management
