= Taiwan Hinoki Museum =

Museum in West, Chiayi City, Taiwan

- 希諾奇台灣檜木博物館
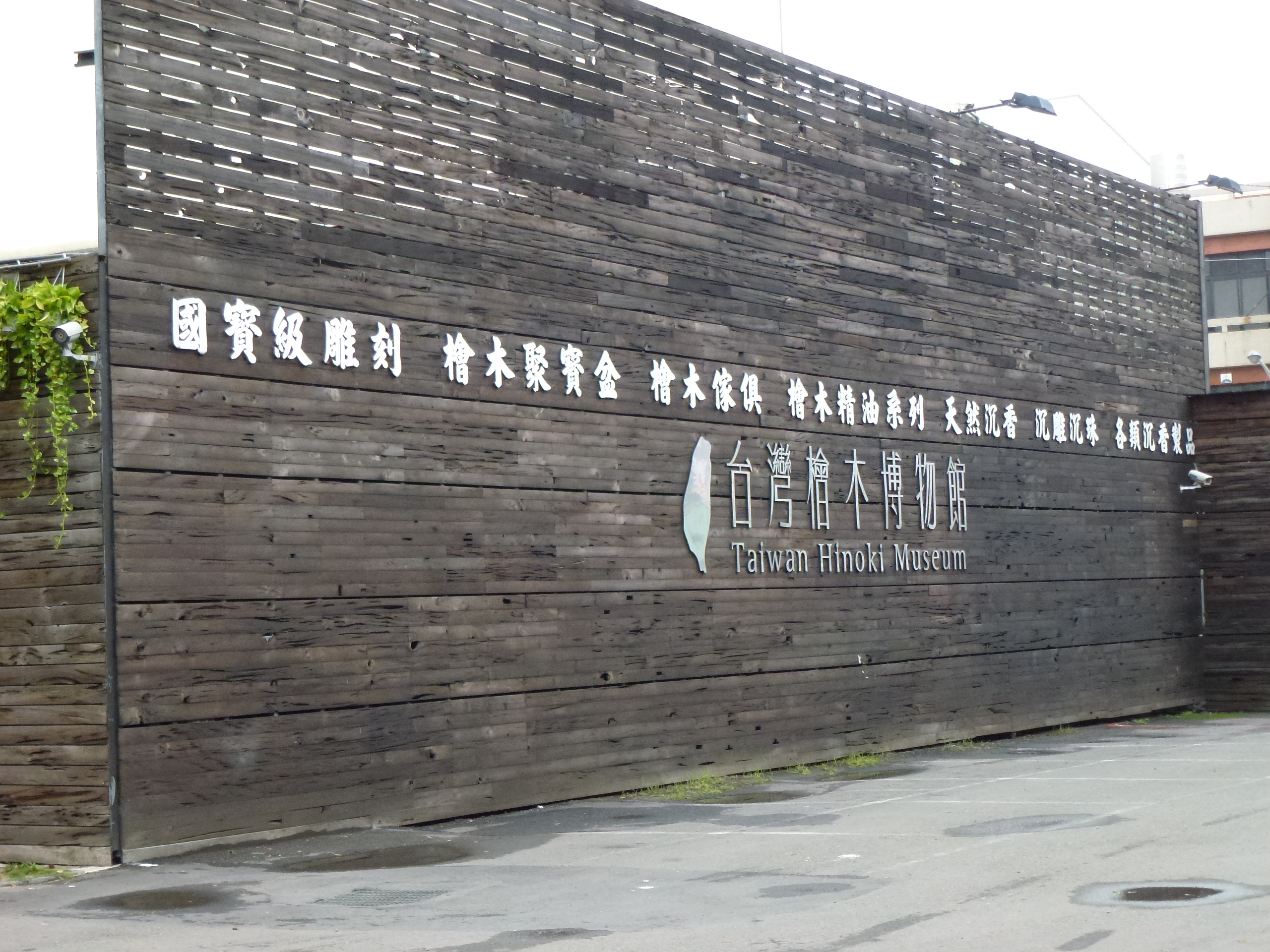
- Location: West, Chiayi City, Taiwan
- Coordinates: 23°28′47″N 120°26′04″E
- Type: museum
- Website: Official website

The Taiwan Hinoki Museum (traditional Chinese: 希諾奇台灣檜木博物館; simplified Chinese: 希诺奇台湾桧木博物馆; pinyin: Xīnuòqí Táiwān Guìmù Bówùguǎn) is a museum about hinoki trees in West District, Chiayi City, Taiwan.

== History ==
The museum building was originally a timber factory. The director then renovated the factory building by adding new elements to create a quality brand with good standing.

== Features ==
- Taiwan hinoki essential oil
- Taiwan hinoki treasure bowl
- Taiwan hinoki spa aromatherapy cream

== Transportation ==
The museum is accessible within walking distance west from Chiayi Station of Taiwan Railway.

== See also ==
- List of museums in Taiwan
