= Taichung City Tun District Art Center =

Art center in Taiping, Taichung, Taiwan

- 臺中市屯區藝文中心
- TTDAC
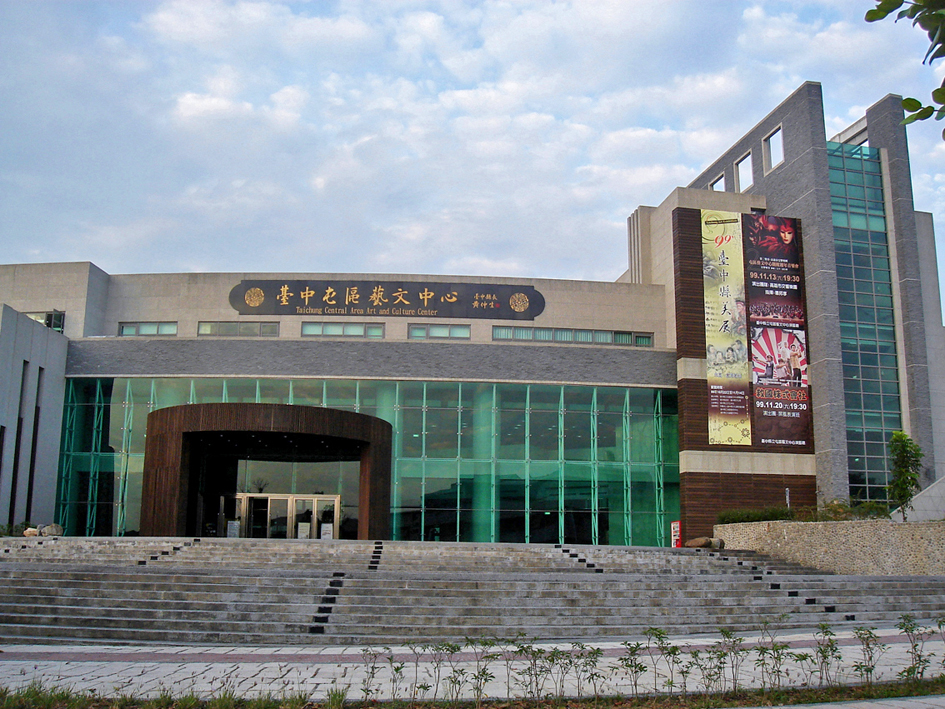
- Interactive map of Taichung City Tun District Art Center
- Location: Taiping, Taichung, Taiwan
- Coordinates: 24°10′34.2″N 120°36′59.5″E
- Type: art center

Website
- Official website

The Taichung City Tun District Art Center (TTDAC; traditional Chinese: 臺中市屯區藝文中心; simplified Chinese: 台中市屯区艺文中心; pinyin: Táizhōng Shì Tún Qū Yìwén Zhōngxīn) is an art center in Taiping District, Taichung, Taiwan as a primary venue for performing arts, music, fine arts and cultural promotion. It is the subordinate institute to Taichung City Cultural Affairs Bureau.

== History ==
The area of the building was originally used as a military practice field and was provided by the military for the Taichung County Government for free.

== Architecture ==
The concept behind the art center is the combination of harmony with moderation and simplicity to create an intelligent building. The circular arch in the building line a musical rhythm gives the building a simplicity, nature, ecology and harmony kind of surrounding.

== See also ==
- List of tourist attractions in Taiwan
