= Chiayi railway station =

Railway station in Chiayi, Taiwan

Chiayi 嘉義
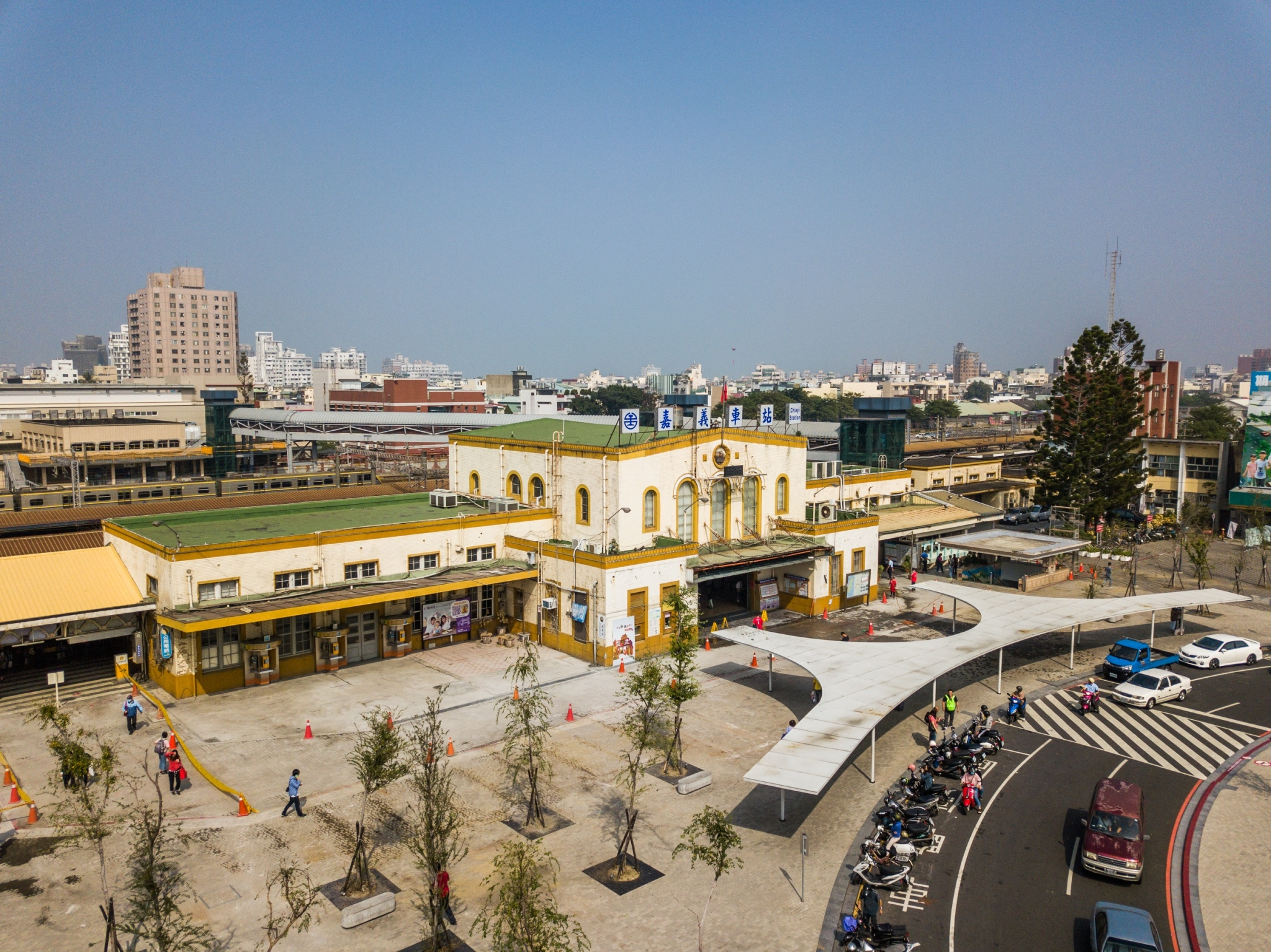

Chinese name
- Traditional Chinese: 嘉義
Transcriptions
Standard Mandarin
- Hanyu Pinyin: Jiāyì
- Bopomofo: ㄐㄧㄚ ㄧˋ
Hakka
- Romanization: Gá-ngi (Sixian dialect); Gà-ngi^{+} (Hailu dialect)
Southern Min
- Tâi-lô: Ka-gī

General information
- Location: 528 Zhongshan Rd; West District, Chiayi; Taiwan
- Coordinates: 23.4791°N 120.4411°E
- System: Taiwan Railway and Alishan Forest railway station
- Lines: Western Trunk line; Main line
- Distance: 291.8 km to Keelung via Taichung (TRA)
- Connections: Local bus; Coach

Construction
- Structure type: Ground level

Other information
- Station code: 4080
- Classification: First class (Chinese: 一等) (TR)
- Website: Taiwan Railway; Alishan Forest Railway

History
- Opened: 1902
- Rebuilt: 1933
- Electrified: 1978-12-19
- Former names: Kagi (Japanese: 嘉義)

Passengers
- 2017: 7.668 million per year ▼1.1% (TRA)
- Rank: 13 out of 228

Services
Preceding station	Taiwan Railway	Following station
Jiabei towards Keelung	Western Trunk line	Shuishang towards Pingtung
Preceding station	Alishan Forest Railway	Following station
Beimen towards Alishan	Main line	Terminus
Location
- Location within Taiwan

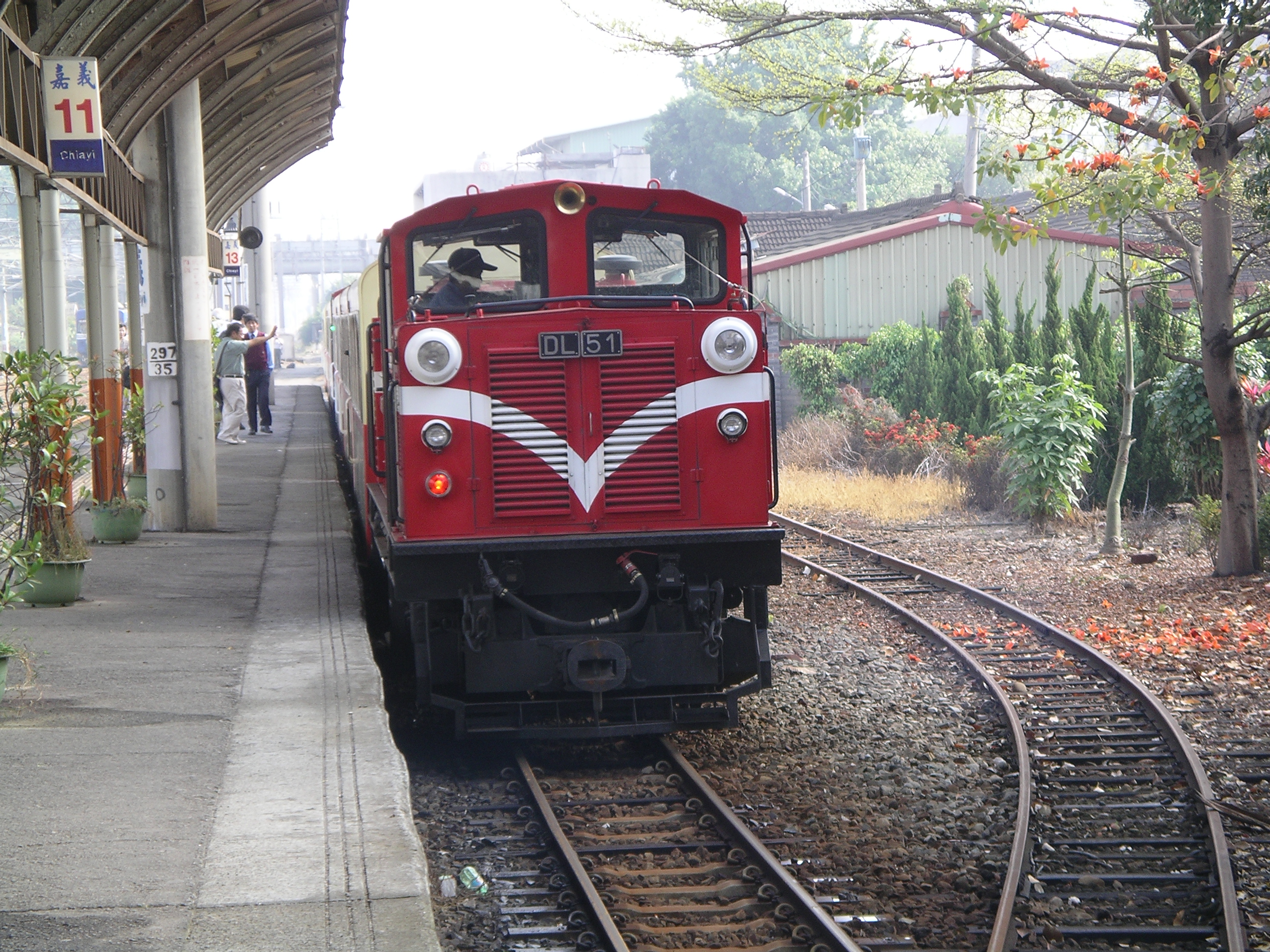
A Chiayi station platform for trains on the Alishan Forest Railway

Chiayi Station at night

Chiayi (Chinese: 嘉義; pinyin: Jiāyì) is a railway station in Chiayi, Taiwan, served by Taiwan Railway and Alishan Forest Railway.

== History ==
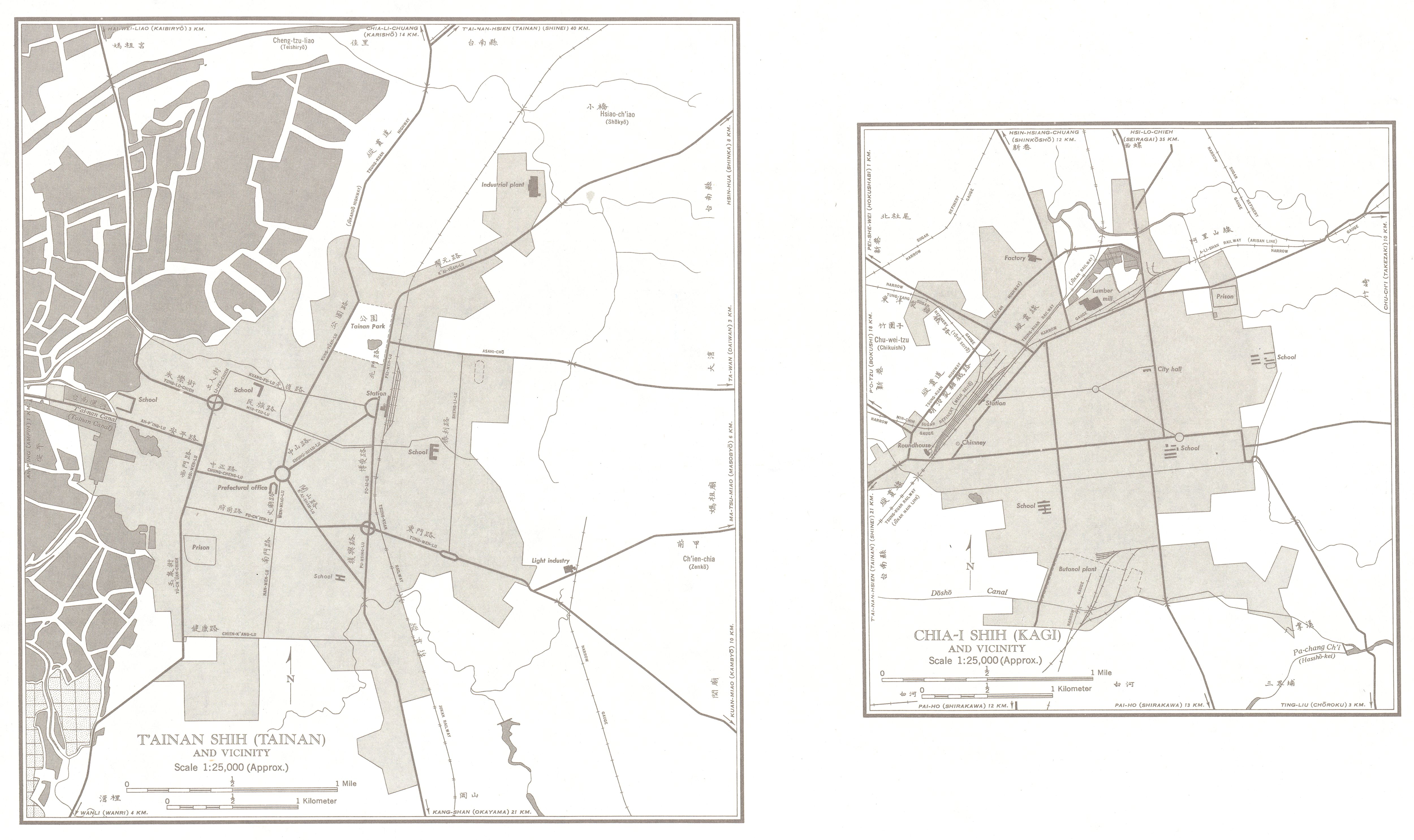
Map including Chiayi railway station (labeled as 'Station') (1950s)

The station was firstly constructed in 1896 and opened on 20 April 1902 with service on the West Coast line. The station was a single-story wooden structure with Japanese style with slant roof and rain-shield walls. The rail line connected to the station roughly divides Chiayi City into two regions. The region located in front of the station prospered as the city business district, while the region located behind the station was scarcely developed. Service to the Alishan Forest Railway began in 1912 from the station. The station was renovated in June 1933 to its current structure. The station is undergoing reconstruction as an elevated station to remove traffic conflicts at level crossings, due to be completed in September 2026.

== Architecture ==
The station is located 30 metres above sea level. The at-grade station has one island platform and one side platform.

It is a steel concrete structure with classical symmetry design, simple gables, geometric totems and streamlined modern design. The platform roofs of the railway station were constructed with the railway tracks.

== Around the station ==
- Art Site of Chiayi Railway Warehouse
- Chia-Le-Fu Night Market
- Chiayi Art Museum
- Chiayi City Council
- Chiayi Cultural and Creative Industries Park
- Chiayi Jen Wu Temple
- Museum of Old Taiwan Tiles
- Renyitan Dam
- Taiwan Hinoki Museum
- Wenhua Road Night Market

== See also ==
- List of railway stations in Taiwan
