= Hsieh Yue-hsia =

Taiwanese actress

- 謝月霞
- Born: Lin San-chiao; 1944; Taiping, Taichung, Taiwan, Empire of Japan
- Died: 4 January 2009 (aged 64–65); Taiwan
- Children: Wang Rong-yu
- Awards: Golden Bell Award for Best Actress in a Miniseries or Television Film

Hsieh Yue-hsia (Chinese: 謝月霞; 1944–2009) was a Taiwanese actress.

She was born Lin San-chiao (林三嬌) is what became Taiping District, Taichung. Lin began training in dance at the age of four, with Hsieh Lien-zhi (謝連枝), and later took her mentor's surname. Hsieh Yue-hsia became known for her Taiwanese opera performances. In 2002, she received the Golden Bell Award for Best Actress in a Miniseries or Television Film. Hsieh, Li Ang, and DJ Chen were featured in Monika Treut's Tigerwomen Grow Wings (2004).

Her son Wang Rong-yu founded Golden Bough Theatre in 1993. Hsieh died on 4 January 2009.
