= National Taitung Living Art Center =

Art center in Taitung City, Taitung County, Taiwan

- 國立臺東生活美學館
- Interactive map of National Taitung Living Art Center
- Location: Taitung City, Taitung County, Taiwan
- Coordinates: 22°45′18.9″N 121°9′3.8″E
- Type: art center

Website
- Official website (in Chinese)

The National Taitung Living Art Center (traditional Chinese: 國立臺東生活美學館; simplified Chinese: 国立台东生活美学馆; pinyin: Guólì Táidōng Shēnghuó Měixuéguǎn) is an art center in Taitung City, Taitung County, Taiwan.

== Activities ==
The center regularly holds various live music performances.

== See also ==
- List of tourist attractions in Taiwan
