= Ashcroft Arts Centre =

Arts centre in Fareham, Hampshire, England

Coordinates: 50.8559°N 1.1760°W

- Interactive map of Ashcroft Arts Centre
- Address: Osborn Road; Fareham, Hampshire; England
- Operator: Hampshire Cultural Trust
- Capacity: 150 (theatre)

Construction
- Opened: 1989; 37 years ago

Website
- Ashcroft Arts Centre

Ashcroft Arts Centre was a performing arts venue in Fareham, Hampshire. It was named after Dame Peggy Ashcroft, and opened by her in 1989, after being refurbished from its original use as a school.

From 2014, the arts centre was operated by Hampshire Cultural Trust. The centre is now closed.

== About ==
The art centre comprises a 150-seat theatre, an art gallery, a dance studio, an art studio and a fully licensed café bar. It is funded by hire costs and ticketed events.

The venue also hosts live music, theatre performances craft workshops, as well as weekly, day time and evening classes. It also hosts the annual CAMRA approved ale festivals
