= Art Site of Chiayi Railway Warehouse =

Former warehouse in West, Chiayi City, Taiwan

- 嘉義鐵道藝術村
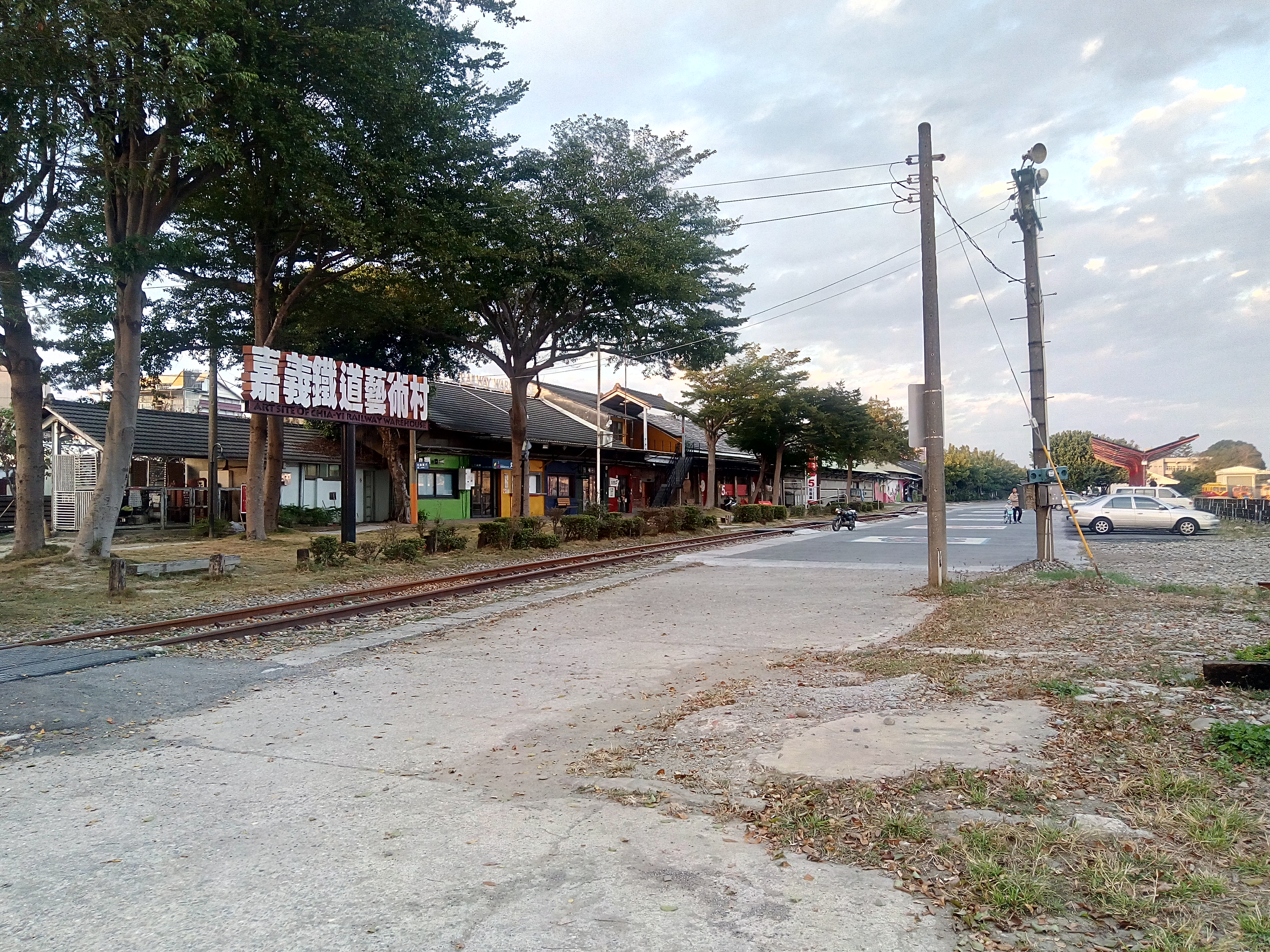
- Interactive map of the Art Site of Chiayi Railway Warehouse area

General information
- Type: former warehouse
- Location: West, Chiayi City, Taiwan
- Coordinates: 25°09′56.4″N 121°26′48.1″E

Technical details
- Floor area: 2,500 m^{2}

Website
- Official website (in Chinese)

The Art Site of Chiayi Railway Warehouse (traditional Chinese: 嘉義鐵道藝術村; simplified Chinese: 嘉义铁道艺术村; pinyin: Jiāyì Tiědào Yìshù Cūn) is a historical warehouse in West District, Chiayi City, Taiwan.

== History ==
In 1999, the Taiwan Provincial Government chose Chiayi City as the place for the Art Network of Railway Warehouse due to its position as the art and culture capital. In July 2000, the Council of Cultural Affairs chose five candidates and then decided to make the warehouse. The warehouse was converted from an idle railway warehouse. The planning work started in September 2000 by Chiayi City Government aiming to turn the warehouse into an art center.

== Architecture ==
The site consists of 12 warehouses forming a block. They provide a total area of 2,500 m^{2} of interior space for creative work, exhibition, performance and education. The outdoor area is divided into outdoor performance area, creative art area and general area.

== Events ==
- Black Golden Section Art Festival

== Transportation ==
The building is accessible within walking distance north of Chiayi Station of Taiwan Railway.

== See also ==
- List of tourist attractions in Taiwan
- Chiayi Station
