= Newcastle Arts Centre =

Fine and performing arts centre in Newcastle upon Tyne, England

Coordinates: 54°58′12.3″N 1°37′4.8″W

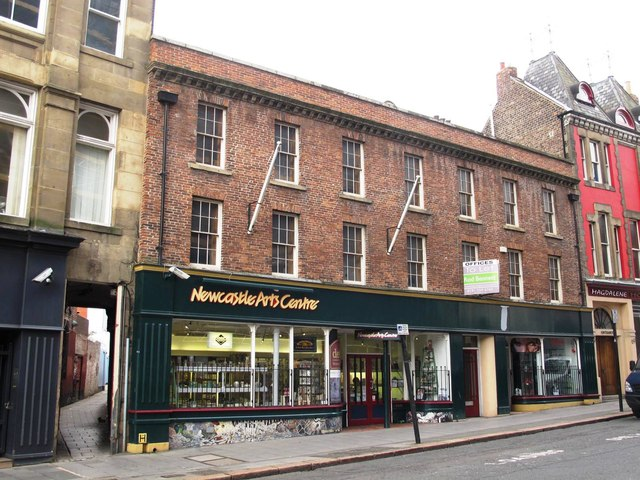
Newcastle Arts Centre

The Newcastle Arts Centre is a fine and performing arts centre in Newcastle upon Tyne, England.

== History ==
The Newcastle Arts Centre was founded in July 1981 by Mike and Norma Tilley. The centre was formed in a block of seven abandoned buildings consisting of merchant houses, shops, warehousing and a former department store in Central Newcastle allowing for a mixed use development where some buildings could be rented out to help fund the provision of art space with a street level access that is integrated into the existing townscape. The Centre was designed with an eye toward maintaining the existing buildings and their identity within the community. After several years of funding and development, the Centre was officially opened by Prince Charles in 1988.

By the end of the 1980s, the Centre was home to Northern Stage and New Writing North, among other photography, audio, and visual arts productions.

The Centre also promoted a successful Edinburgh Fringe stopover programme and an annual professional craft fair. Newcastle Arts Centre has operated without revenue grant aid since 1993, supported by 82,000 visitors per year.

== Awards and recognition ==
The architectural innovation of the Newcastle Arts Centre was recognized with a Times/RIBA Community Enterprise Award. It was also the subject of a case study in Arts and the Changing City.
