= Thresholds =

Thresholds is a 501(c)(3) nonprofit organization founded in 1959 serving persons with mental illnesses and substance abuse problems in Illinois. Thresholds is the largest community-based mental healthcare provider in Illinois, providing services to more than 7,000 people every year.

Thresholds has over 1,000 employees offering support programs in Chicagoland in Cook, DuPage, Kankakee, Lake and McHenry counties. Its main office is in Ravenswood, Chicago. In 2026, the organization was named among the Chicago Tribune Top Workplaces for the 13th consecutive year. In 2025 Thresholds was ranked #16 among large companies (1,000 or more employees) in Top Workplaces USA following a national survey co-sponsored by Energage and USA TODAY. Illinois Governor JB Pritzker officially declared April 23, 2026, as Thresholds Day in Illinois, recognizing particularly the organization’s community-based care and crisis response initiatives. Mark Ishaug is President and CEO, and Sherin Khan is Chief Strategy Officer.

== See also ==
- Rosecrance
- Juvenile Protective Association
