= Central Tunnel =

Railway tunnel in Taiwan

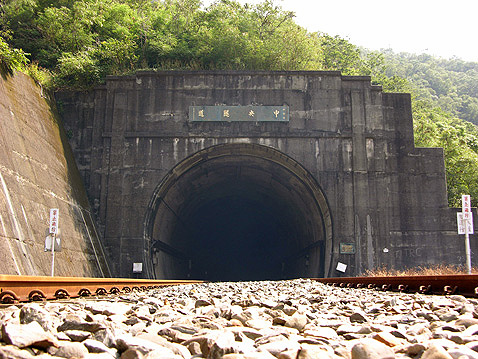
- View looking towards the western portal of the Central Tunnel
- Interactive map of Central Tunnel

Overview
- Line: South-link Line
- Location: Daren, Taitung County; Shizi, Pingtung County
- Coordinates: 22°17′05″N 120°46′57″E
- Status: in use
- System: Taiwan Railways Administration
- Crosses: Central Mountain Range; Tea stay in the mountains
- Start: Central Signal Station (west side: Shizi, Pingtung County)
- End: Guzhuang Station (east side: Daren, Taitung County, This station at Dawu )
- No. of stations: Central Signal Station

Operation
- Work began: 1985
- Opened: 1991
- Owner: Taiwan Railways Administration
- Operator: Taiwan Railways Administration
- Traffic: rail

Technical
- Length: 8,070 metres (26,480 ft)
- No. of tracks: double track
- Track gauge: 1,067 mm (3 ft 6 in)
- Electrified: non - electrification interval
- Operating speed: 110 km/h
- Max elevation: 175 metres (574 ft)
- Tunnel clearance: 7.12 metres (23 ft)
- Width: 8.154 metres (27 ft)
- Grade: 0.002–0.008

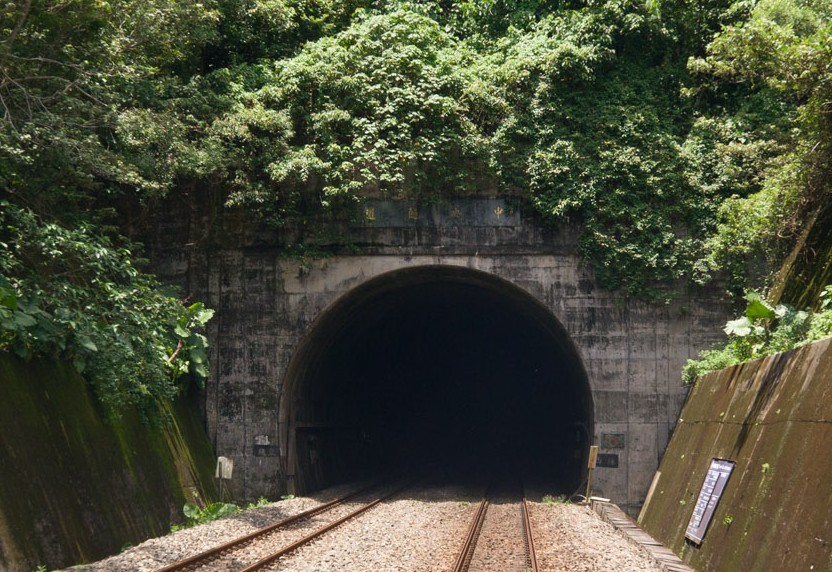
Along the tracks looking towards the eastern portal of the Central Tunnel

Central Tunnel (Chinese: 中央隧道; pinyin: Zhōngyāng Suìdào) is a tunnel that runs through the Central Mountain Range, carrying Taiwan Railway's South-link line between Fangshan Station and Guzhuang Station. At 8,070 metres (26,480 ft), it was the longest railway tunnel in Taiwan when it opened (now second only to the 10,307-metre (33,816 ft) Xinguanyin Tunnel). The tunnel has a dike and two ventilation shafts.

== See also ==
- Fangshan Station
- Guzhuang Station
- Central Signal Station
- Pu'an Signal Station
