= Fangye railway station =

Railway station in Shizi, Pingtung County, Taiwan

Fangye Signal Station 枋野號誌站
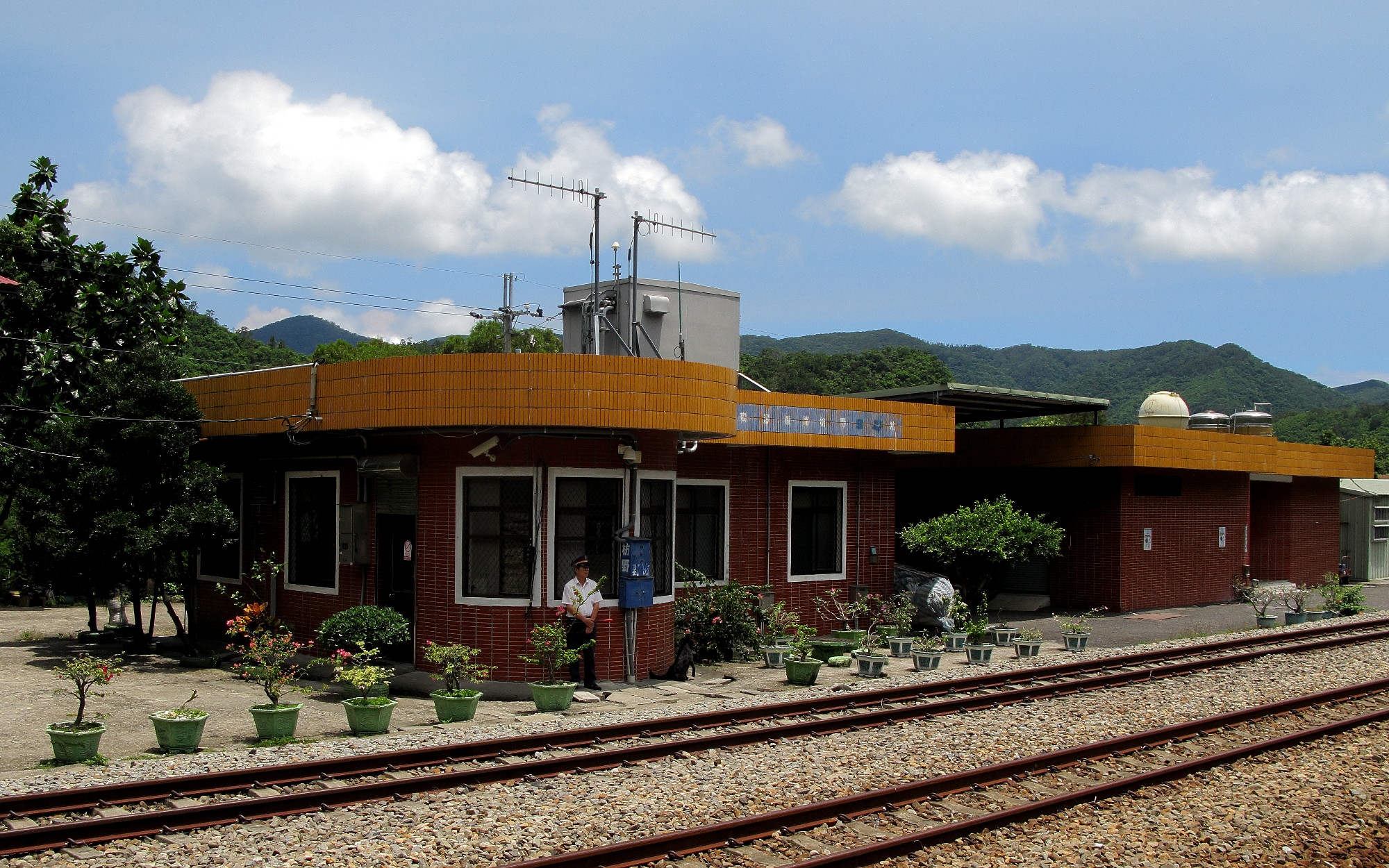

General information
- Location: Shizi, Pingtung County, Taiwan
- Coordinates: 22.280956°N 120.71708°E
- Owner: Taiwan Railway Corporation
- Operator: Taiwan Railway Corporation
- Line: South-link
- Train operators: Taiwan Railway Corporation

History
- Opened: 5 October 1992
Location

Fangye Signal Station (Chinese: 枋野號誌站; pinyin: Fāngyě Hàozhì Zhàn) is a staffed railway station on the Taiwan Railway (TR) South-link line located in Shizi Township, Pingtung County, Taiwan. Although staffed, it is not a commuter station and has no scheduled train service.

== Usage ==
The station is Taiwan's least used station, averaging only one passenger per day in 2012 (according to the TRA official report in 2015, the least used station is Neishi).

This is a traffic control station for trains making temporary stops to wait for another train to pass, and is only used by railway workers.

== Nearby stations ==
Taiwan Railway Administration
South-link Line

Fangshan - Fangye - Central Signal - ~~Puan Signal~~ - Guzhuang

== See also ==
- List of railway stations in Taiwan
