= Pu'an Signal Station =

Railway station in Daren, Taitung County, Taiwan

Coordinates: 22.275004°N 120.741551°E

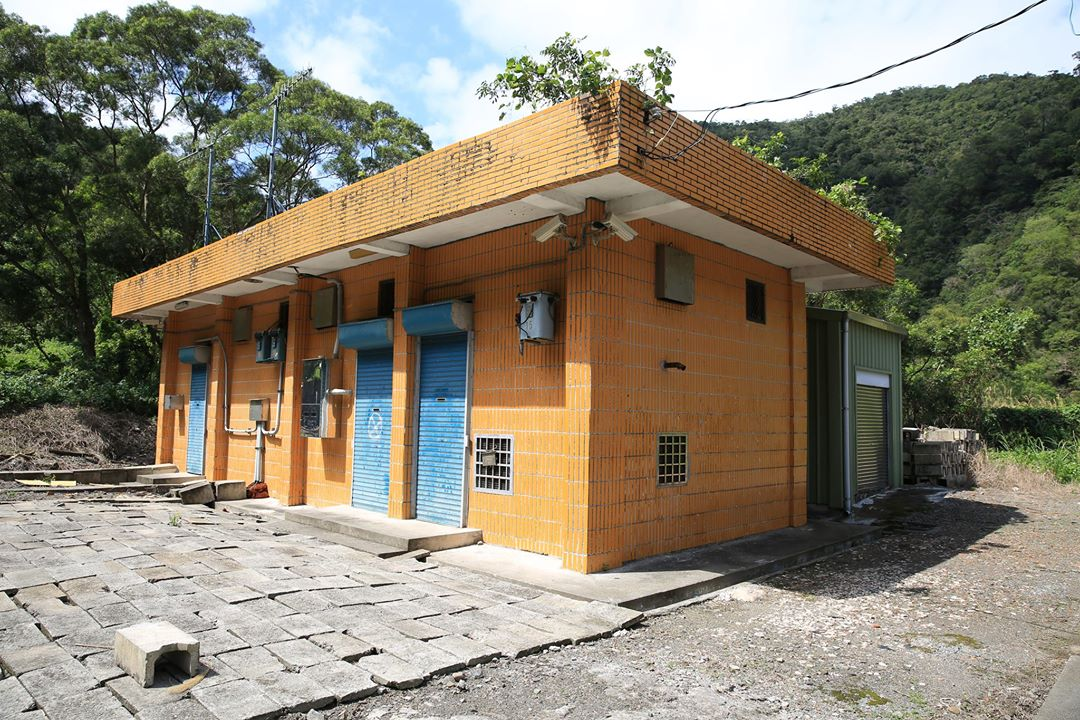
Pu'an Signal Station

Pu'an Signal Station (Chinese: 菩安號誌站; pinyin: Pú ān hào zhì zhàn) is a railway station on Taiwan Railway (TR) South-Link Line located in Daren Township, Taitung County, Taiwan.

== Nearby stations ==
Taiwan Railway Administration
South-link Line

Fangshan - Fangye Signal - Central Signal - ~~Puan Signal~~ - Guzhuang

== See also ==
- List of railway stations in Taiwan
