= Fangliao railway station =

Railway station in Fangliao, Pingtung County, Taiwan

Fangliao 枋寮
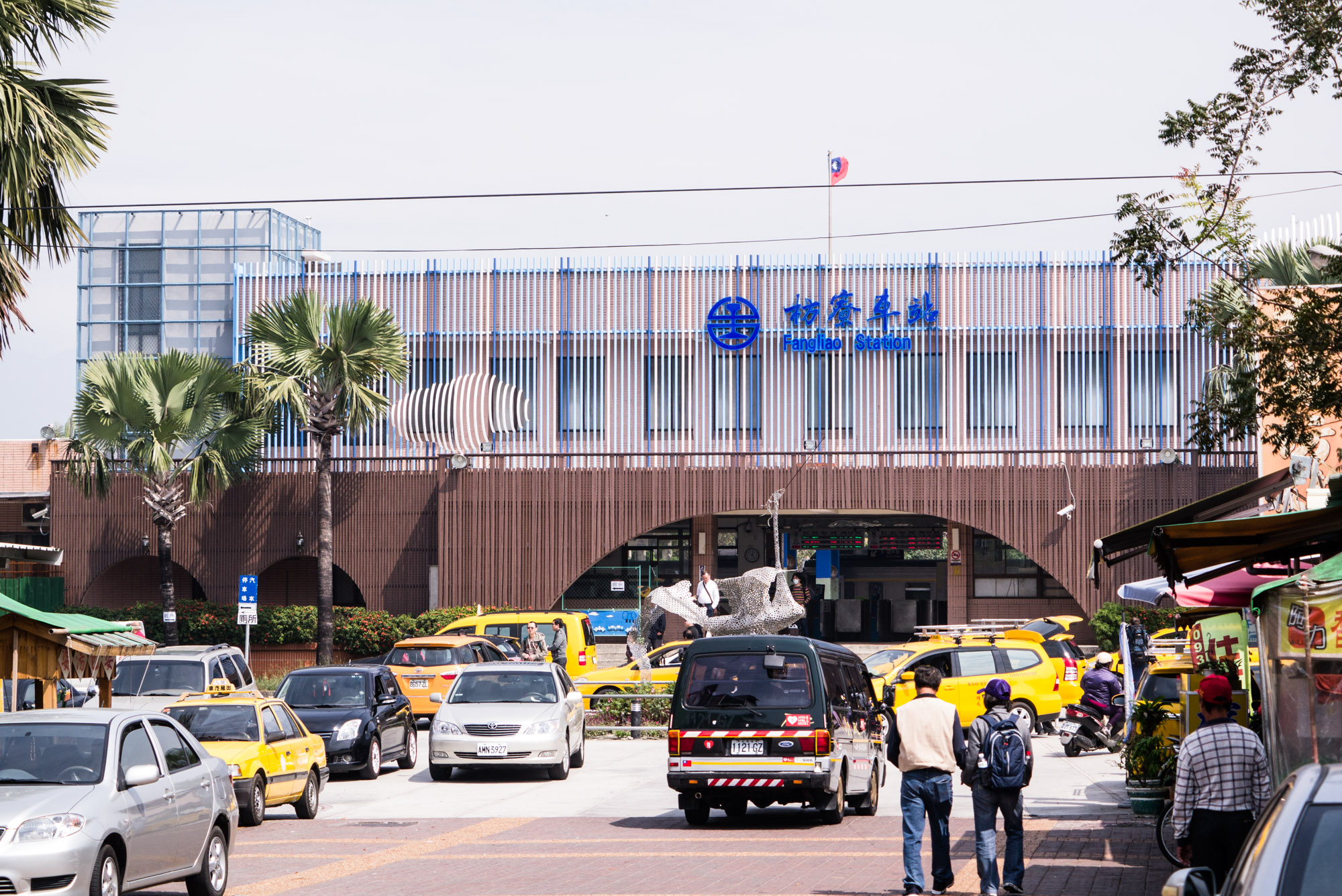

General information
- Location: Fangliao Village, No. 18, Chuyun Rd. Fangliao, Pingtung, Taiwan
- Coordinates: 22°22′06″N 120°35′42″E
- Operated by: Taiwan Railway Corporation
- Lines: Western Trunk line (203); South-link line (203)
- Distance: 61.3 km from Kaohsiung
- Connections: Bus stop

Construction
- Structure type: At-grade

Other information
- Classification: 三等站 (Taiwan Railway level)

History
- Opened: 15 December 1941

Passengers
- 2,258 daily (2024)

Services
Preceding station	Taiwan Railway	Following station
Donghai towards Kaohsiung	Western Trunk line (Pingtung)	Terminus
Terminus	South-link line	Jialu towards Taitung
Location

Fangliao (Chinese: 枋寮車站; pinyin: Fāngliáo Chēzhàn) is a railway station of the Taiwan Railway at the junction of the Pingtung line and the South-link line. It is located in Fangliao Township, Pingtung County, Taiwan.

== Overview ==
The station has two island platforms. It is a class three station.

=== History ===
- 15 December 1941: The station opened as a terminal station of the West Coast line.
- August 1943: The section between Linjian and Fangliao was removed due to war.
- 16 January 1953: A new station opened.
- 16 December 1991: The South-link line (which extends from this station) opened with a ceremony at the station.
- 15 January 1992: The South-link line opened for temporary service.
- 5 October 1992: The South-link line fully opened for service, thus completing a complete rail network loop around Taiwan.

== Around the station ==
- Fangliao Township downtown
- Fangliao F3 Art District
- Fangliao Township Office
- Fangliao Fishing Area
- Pingtung County Police Department, Fangliao Branch
- Fangliao High School
- Bus transfer stations

== See also ==
- List of railway stations in Taiwan
