= Jialu railway station =

Railway station in Fangshan, Taiwan

Jialu Station 加祿車站
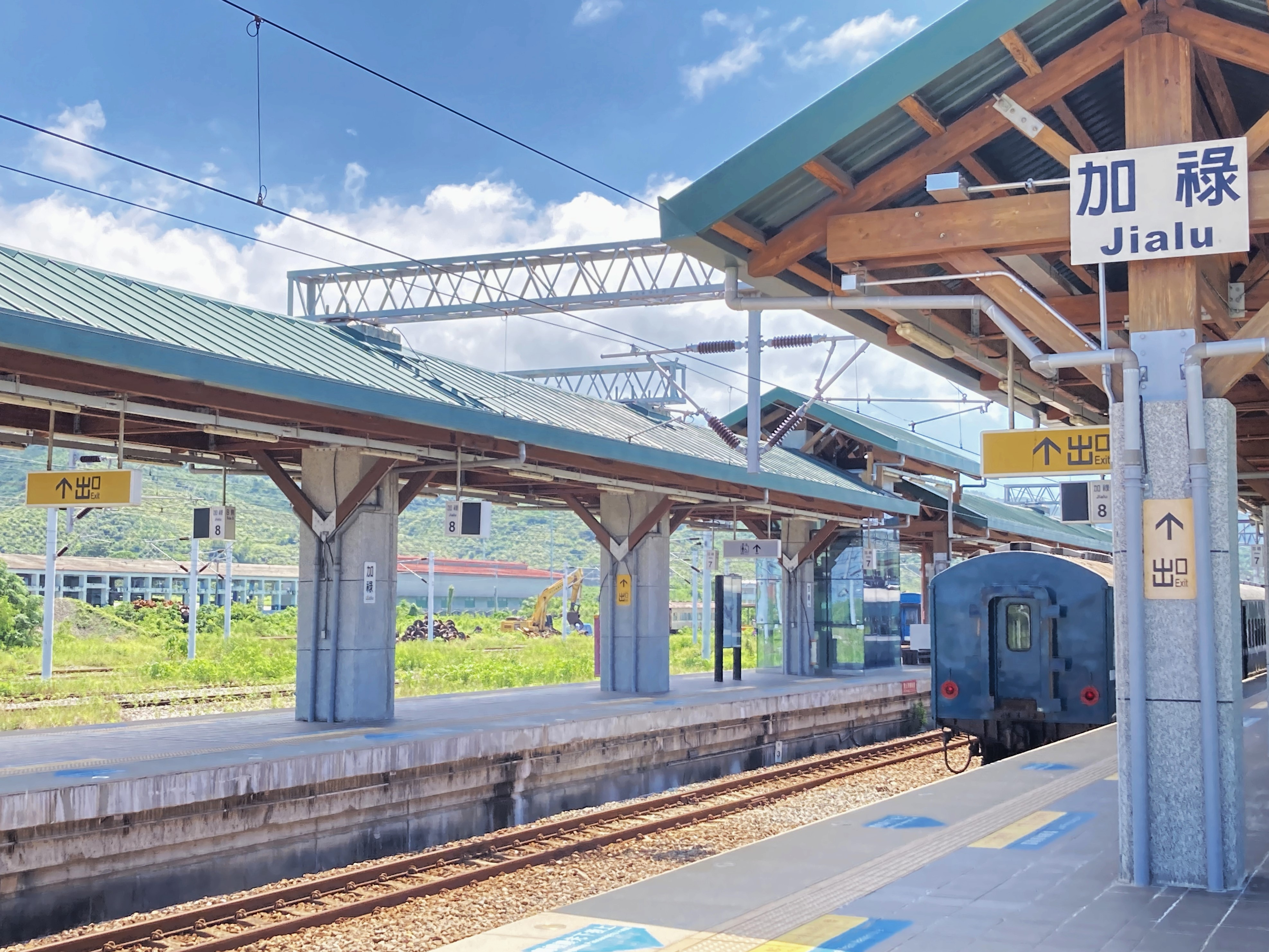

General information
- Location: Fangshan, Pingtung County, Taiwan
- Coordinates: 22.331082°N 120.624753°E
- System: Train station
- Owner: Taiwan Railway Corporation
- Operator: Taiwan Railway Corporation
- Line: South-link
- Train operators: Taiwan Railway Corporation

History
- Opened: 5 October 1992

Passengers
- 79 daily (2024)

Services
Preceding station	Taiwan Railway	Following station
Fangliao towards Pingtung	South-link line	Neishi towards Taitung
Location

Jialu (Chinese: 加祿車站; pinyin: Jiālù Chēzhàn) is a railway station on the Taiwan Railway South-link line located in Fangshan Township, Pingtung County, Taiwan.

== History ==
The station was opened on 5 October 1992.

== See also ==
- List of railway stations in Taiwan
