= Zhiben Wetlands =

Wetland in Taitung City, Taitung County, Taiwan

- 知本濕地 (Chinese)
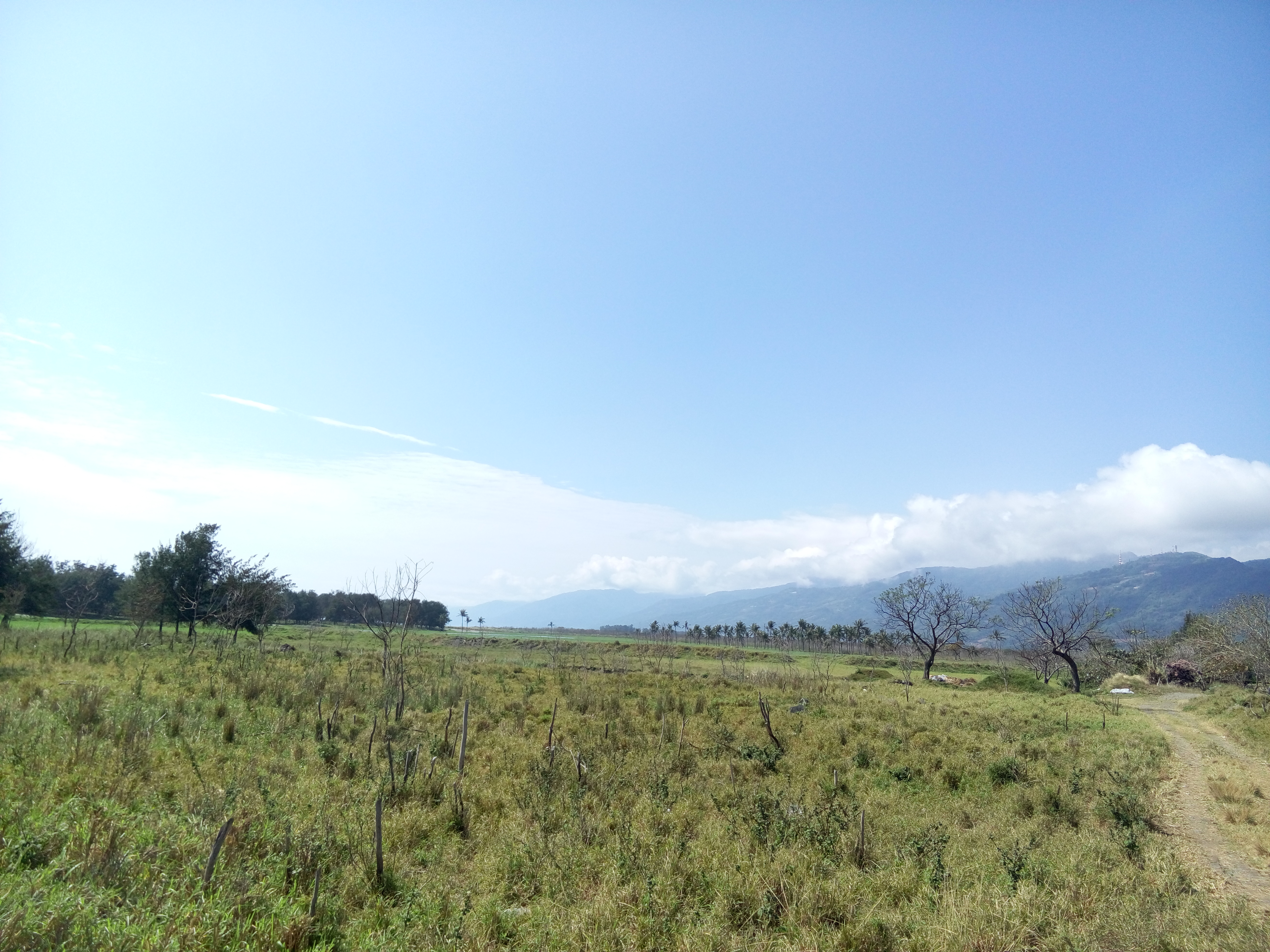

- Location within Taitung County
- Location: Taitung City, Taitung County, Taiwan
- Coordinates: 22°41′38.3″N 121°03′54.6″E
- Type: wetland

The Zhiben Wetlands (simplified Chinese: 知本湿地; traditional Chinese: 知本濕地; pinyin: Zhīběn Shīdì) is a wetland in Taitung City, Taitung County, Taiwan.

== Geography ==
The wetland is a major habitat for endangered migratory birds.

== Transportation ==
The wetland is easily accessible and within walking south of Zhiben Station of Taiwan Railway.

== See also ==
- List of tourist attractions in Taiwan
