= Fangshan Post Office =

Post office in Fangshan, Pingtung County, Taiwan

- 枋山郵局
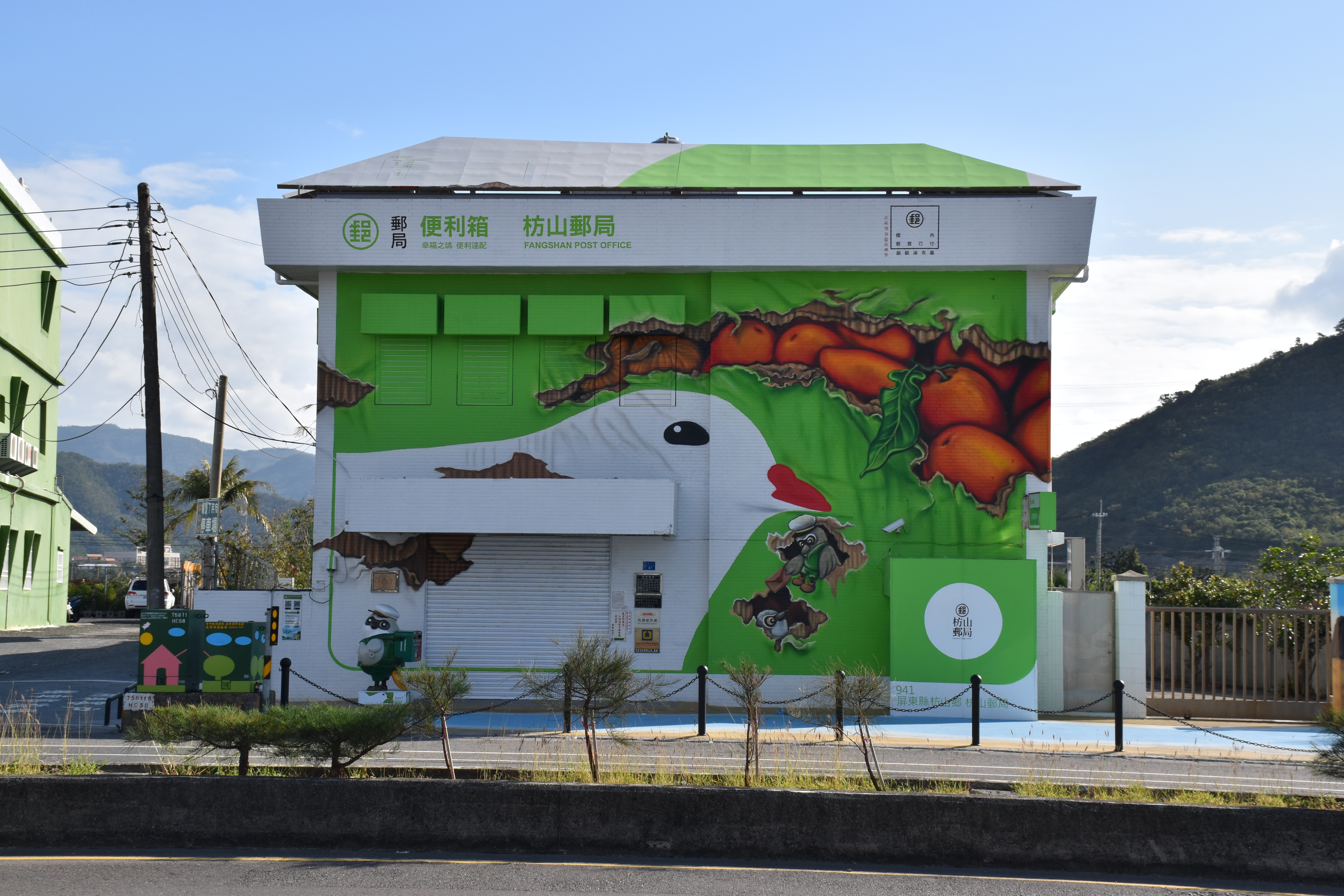
- Interactive map of the Fangshan Post Office area

General information
- Type: post office
- Architectural style: bulk box
- Location: Fangshan, Pingtung County, Taiwan
- Coordinates: 22°11′54.6″N 120°41′22.7″E
- Opened: 14 October 2016
- Owner: Chunghwa Post

Website
- Official website (in Chinese)

The Fangshan Post Office (traditional Chinese: 枋山郵局; simplified Chinese: 枋山邮局; pinyin: Fāngshān Yóujú) is a post office in Fangshan Township, Pingtung County, Taiwan.

== History ==
The post office was opened on 14 October 2016 as the 41st branch of Pingtung post office.

== Architecture ==
The post office was designed resembling a shipping box with green and white exterior. It features an image of a shrike, the Chunghwa Post corrugated shopping boxes image and mangoes and onions, the local agricultural product of Fangshan. The roof features a large screen which opens up every hour. It is also powered by solar energy.

== See also ==
- List of tourist attractions in Taiwan
