= South Link line =

Railway line in Taiwan

Overview
- Native name: 南迴線
- Termini: Pingtung; Taitung
- Stations: 32

Service
- Type: Conventional railway
- Operator(s): Taiwan Railway Corporation

History
- Opened: 16 December 1991

Technical
- Line length: 138.5 km (86.1 mi)
- Number of tracks: 1 (predominantly)
- Track gauge: 3 ft 6 in (1,067 mm)
- Electrification: yes
- Operating speed: 130 km/h (81 mph)

The South Link line (Chinese: 南迴線; pinyin: Nánhuí Xiàn) is a line of the Taiwan Railway running across the southern tip of the island of Taiwan, connecting the eastern and western coasts. It is 98.2 km long, of which 81.4 km is single-track.

The section between Nanzhou and Linbian railway stations was upgraded from a single-track railway to a dual-track railway while the other sections remains in single-track. In conjunction with electrification works on the line, train platforms are being lengthened and upgraded with better facilities.

== History ==
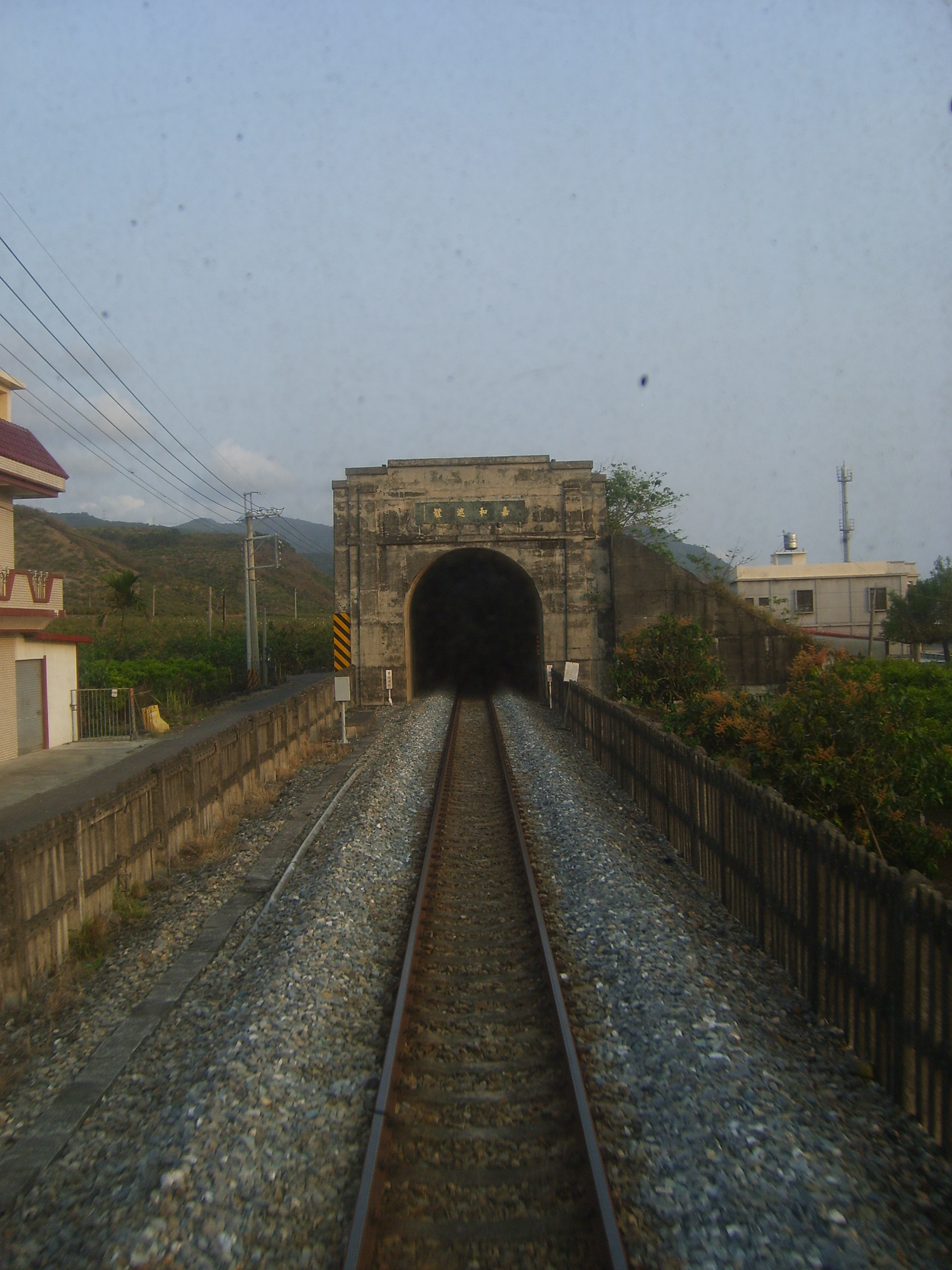
A section of track on the South Link line

Japanese authorities had planned for a railway running between Pingtung and Taitung, but were unable to complete it before World War II ended. After the Kuomintang-led ROC government took control, surveys were completed in 1947, 1958, 1963, 1968, and 1976, delineating ten possible routes for the South Link Line. Construction began in July 1980, and was completed in November 1991. Upon its inauguration on 16 December 1991, the South Link line became the newest standard rail line operated by the TRA, and created an around-the-island railway network. The line began became accessible for public use in February 1992.

In August 2009, sections of the line were badly damaged by floods triggered by Typhoon Morakot. The line was reopened on 30 December 2009.

In September 2010, service was temporarily suspended due to Typhoon Fanapi. The Taimali River (Chinese: 太麻里溪) had risen substantially and washed away 100 m (330 ft) of railway embankment. The line was reopened on 29 September 2010. The Taiwan Railway Administration plans to spend an additional NT$240 million on a double-tracked, 520 m (1,710 ft) bridge over the Taimali River to avoid future problems with flooding.

Electrification works on the final unelectrified section from Fangliao Station to Zhiben Station was completed in December 2020, with the first passenger services operating on 20 December 2020.

== Stations ==
Name	Chinese	Taiwanese	Hakka	Transfers and notes	Location		
Fangliao	枋寮	Pang-liâu	Piông-liàu	→ Pingtung Line	Fangliao	Fangliao	Pingtung; County
Jialu	加祿	Ka-lo̍k	Kâ-luk		Jialu	Fangshan	Pingtung; County
Neishi	內獅	Lāi-sai	Nui-sṳ̂	Least used station in Taiwan (2019)	Jialu	Fangshan	Pingtung; County
Fangshan	枋山	Pang-soaⁿ	Piông-sân	Southernmost railway station in Taiwan	Neishi	Shizi	Pingtung; County
Fangye	枋野	Pang-iá	Piông-yâ		Neishi	Shizi	Pingtung; County
Central Signal	中央號誌	Tiong-iong Hō-chì	Tûng-ông Ho-chì		Neishi	Shizi	Pingtung; County
Guzhuang Signal	古莊號誌	Kó͘-chng Hō-chì	Kú-chông Hō-chì		Shangwu	Dawu	Taitung; County
Dawu	大武	Tāi-bú	Thai-vú		Dawu	Dawu	Taitung; County
Longxi	瀧溪	Liông-khe	Lùng-hâi		Duoliang	Taimali	Taitung; County
Jinlun	金崙	Kim-lun	Kîm-lûn		Jinlun	Taimali	Taitung; County
Taimali	太麻里	Thài-mâ-lí	Thai-mà-lî		Dawang	Taimali	Taitung; County
Zhiben	知本	Ti-pún	Tî-pún		Zhiben	Taitung	Taitung; County
Kangle	康樂	Khong-lo̍k	Không-lo̍k		Kangle	Taitung	Taitung; County
Taitung	臺東	Tâi-tang	Thòi-tûng	→ Taitung Line	Yanwan	Taitung	Taitung; County

Note: Central Signal Station - Guzhuang Station passes through Daren of Taitung County, original set Pu'an Signal Station, now stop working.

== See also ==
- List of railway stations in Taiwan
