= Donghai railway station =

Railway station in Fangliao, Pingtung County, Taiwan

Donghai Station 東海車站
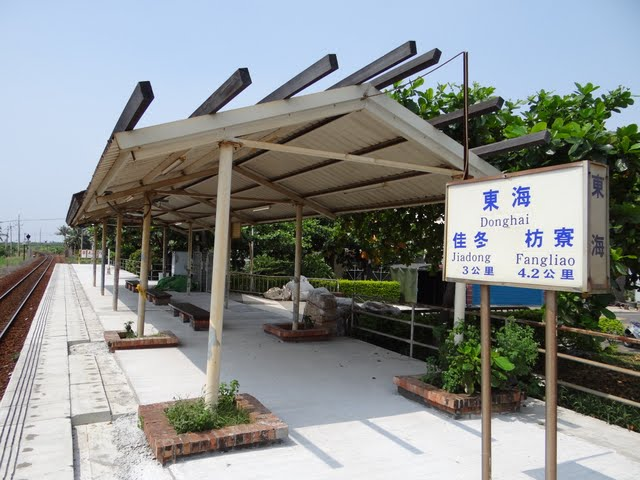
- Station platform

Chinese name
- Traditional Chinese: 東海車站
Transcriptions
Standard Mandarin
- Hanyu Pinyin: Dōnghǎi Chēzhàn
- Bopomofo: ㄉㄨㄥ ㄏㄞˇ ㄔㄜ ㄓㄢˋ

General information
- Location: Fangliao, Pingtung County, Taiwan
- Coordinates: 22°23′56.2″N 120°34′20.4″E
- System: Taiwan Railway railway station
- Line: Pingtung line
- Distance: 57.2 km to Kaohsiung
- Platforms: 1 side platform

Construction
- Structure type: At-grade

Other information
- Station code: 201

History
- Opened: 16 January 1953

Passengers
- 2017: 19,229 per year
- Rank: 191

Services
Preceding station	Taiwan Railway	Following station
Jiadong towards Kaohsiung	Western Trunk line (Pingtung)	Fangliao Terminus
Location

Donghai railway station (Chinese: 東海車站; pinyin: Dōnghǎi Chēzhàn) is a railway station located in Fangliao Township, Pingtung County, Taiwan. It is located on the Pingtung line and is operated by the Taiwan Railway. It has one side platform.

This is a greeting station. It is in the Taiwan Railway South Link Railway Station Renovation Project to renovate the station's exterior facilities and surrounding landscape, and was expected to be completed by the end of 2024.

The train numbers listed are for reference only. All express trains do stop, except for the southbound 3001 and 3005, and the northbound 3028 and 3032. All other express trains do stop. All local trains stop.

According to 2023 data, the station's daily passenger volume is approximately 185, ranking 191st among Taiwan Railway stations.

== History ==
- January 16, 1953: Along with the restoration of the Linbian station and Fangliao station section, Beiqiwei station was established.
- January 1, 1966: Because the administrative area belonged to Donghai Village, Fangliao Township, the station name was changed to "Donghai station" to match the place name.
- January 1, 1979: It was downgraded from a simple station to a greeting station and was designated to be managed by Jiadong station.
- July 16, 2003: The management station was changed from Jiadong station to Fangliao station.
- January 1, 2016: Multi-card card swipe machine activated.
- December 20, 2019: In conjunction with the electrification project of the South-Loop Railway, the Chaozhou to Fangliao section was electrified and opened to traffic.

== Ridership ==
-2000年
Year	Annual				Daily	
Year	Get on the bus	Get off the bus	Get on and off the bus	References	Get on the bus	Get off the bus
1975	69,427	52,998	122,425		190	335
1976	66,149	54,538	120,687		181	330
1977	64,138	49,410	113,548		176	311
1978	無資料					
1979	無資料					
1980	49,882	79,174	129,056		136	353
1981	40,942	66,593	107,535		112	295
1982	40,495	70,944	111,439		111	305
1983	29,706	50,945	80,651		81	221
1984	34,951	56,282	91,233		95	249
1985	36,291	57,866	94,157		99	258
1986	38,167	59,444	97,611		105	267
1987	32,267	53,848	86,115		88	236
1988	18,884	38,411	57,295		52	157
1989	15,595	33,021	48,616		43	133
1990	12,366	28,921	41,287		34	113
1991	10,608	25,569	36,177		29	99
1992	9,070	23,594	32,664		25	89
1993	7,829	25,448	33,277		21	91
1994	6,057	25,167	31,224		17	86
1995	3,388	21,021	24,409		9	67
1996	2,398	15,682	18,080		7	49
1997	3,259	17,036	20,295		9	56
1998	1,706	10,324	12,030		5	33
1999	3,366	11,985	15,351		9	42
2000	1,071	13,783	14,854		3	41

2001年-
Year	Annual				Daily	
Year	Get on the bus	Get off the bus	Get on and off the bus	References	Get on the bus	Get off the bus
2001	5,851	33,416	39,267		16	108
2002	6,865	10,910	17,775		19	49
2003	6,792	8,995	15,787		19	43
2004	7,755	9,115	16,870		21	46
2005	10,152	11,589	21,741		28	60
2006	14,444	16,727	31,171		40	85
2007	18,267	20,070	38,337		50	105
2008	18,880	20,297	39,177		52	107
2009	11,359	11,716	23,075		(Note: 因為受到八八水災影響，該年8月8日至12月29日停駛)43	86
2010	14,613	17,545	32,158		40	88
2011	14,806	18,633	33,439		41	92
2012	17,469	21,130	38,599		48	105
2013	19,648	23,082	42,730		54	117
2014	21,345	24,250	45,595		58	125
2015	18,766	22,237	41,003		51	112
2016	18,883	20,160	39,043		52	107
2017	19,229	19,910	39,139		53	107
2018	18,951	20,139	39,090		52	107
2019	18,715	21,110	39,825		51	109
2020	21,110	26,148	47,258		58	129
2021	18,268	19,520	37,788		50	104
2022	18,423	31,001	49,424		50	135
2023						
