= Fangshan, Pingtung =

Rural township in Pingtung County, Taiwan

Coordinates: 22°16′N 120°39′E

Fangshan Township 枋山鄉
- Rural township
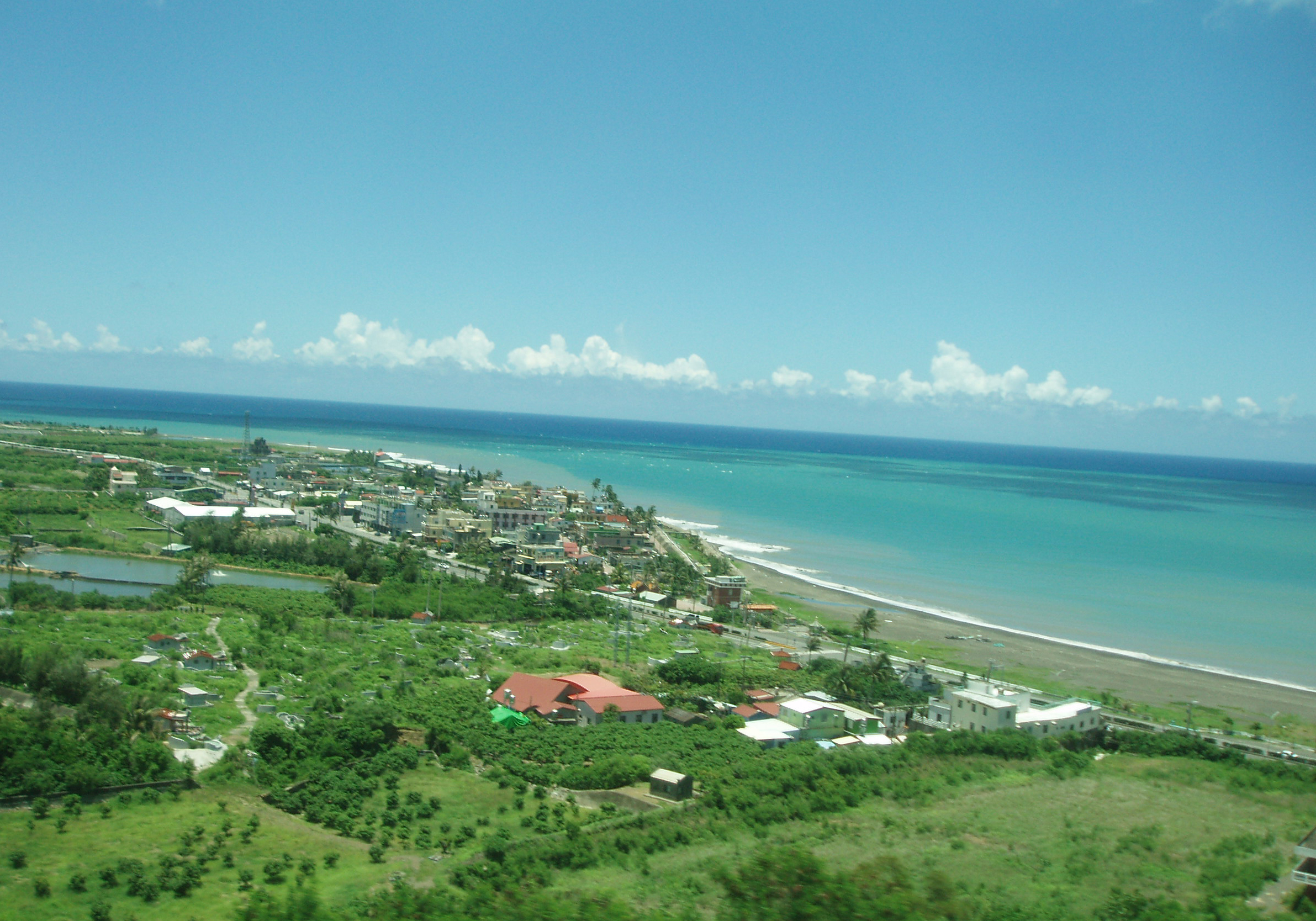

- Fangshan Township in Pingtung County
- Location: Pingtung County, Taiwan

Area
  - Total: 17 km^{2} (6.6 sq mi)

Population (February 2024)
  - Total: 5,005
  - Density: 290/km^{2} (760/sq mi)

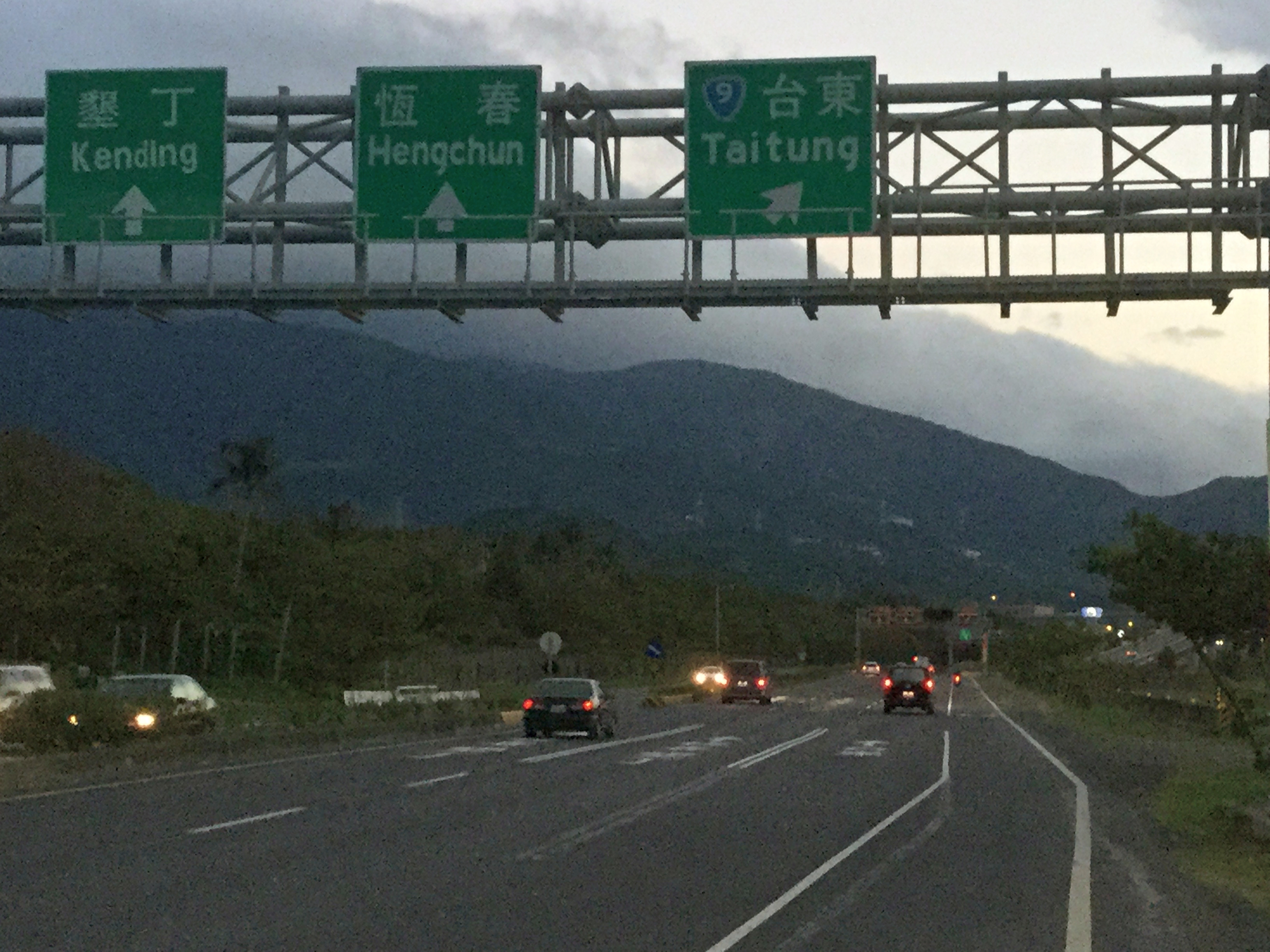
Provincial Highway 1

Fangshan Township (Chinese: 枋山鄉; pinyin: Fāngshān Xiāng) is a coastal rural township in Pingtung County, Taiwan.

== Administrative divisions ==
The township comprises the four villages of Fangshan, Fenggang, Jialu and Shanyu.

== Economy ==
The township is famous for its Aiwen mangoes, which are exported to Asian countries.

== Infrastructure ==
=== Submarine communication cables ===
Fangshan is one of the two cable landing points of Taiwan island (the other one is Toucheng). Four submarine communication cables, including C2C and SEA-ME-WE 3, connect here.

== Tourist attractions ==
- Fangshan Post Office

== Transportation ==
The township is served by Neishi Station and Jialu Station of Taiwan Railway South-Link Line.

== Notable people ==
- Tsai Ing-wen, President of Taiwan
