= Dawu railway station =

Railway station in Dawu, Taitung County, Taiwan

Dawu station 大武車站
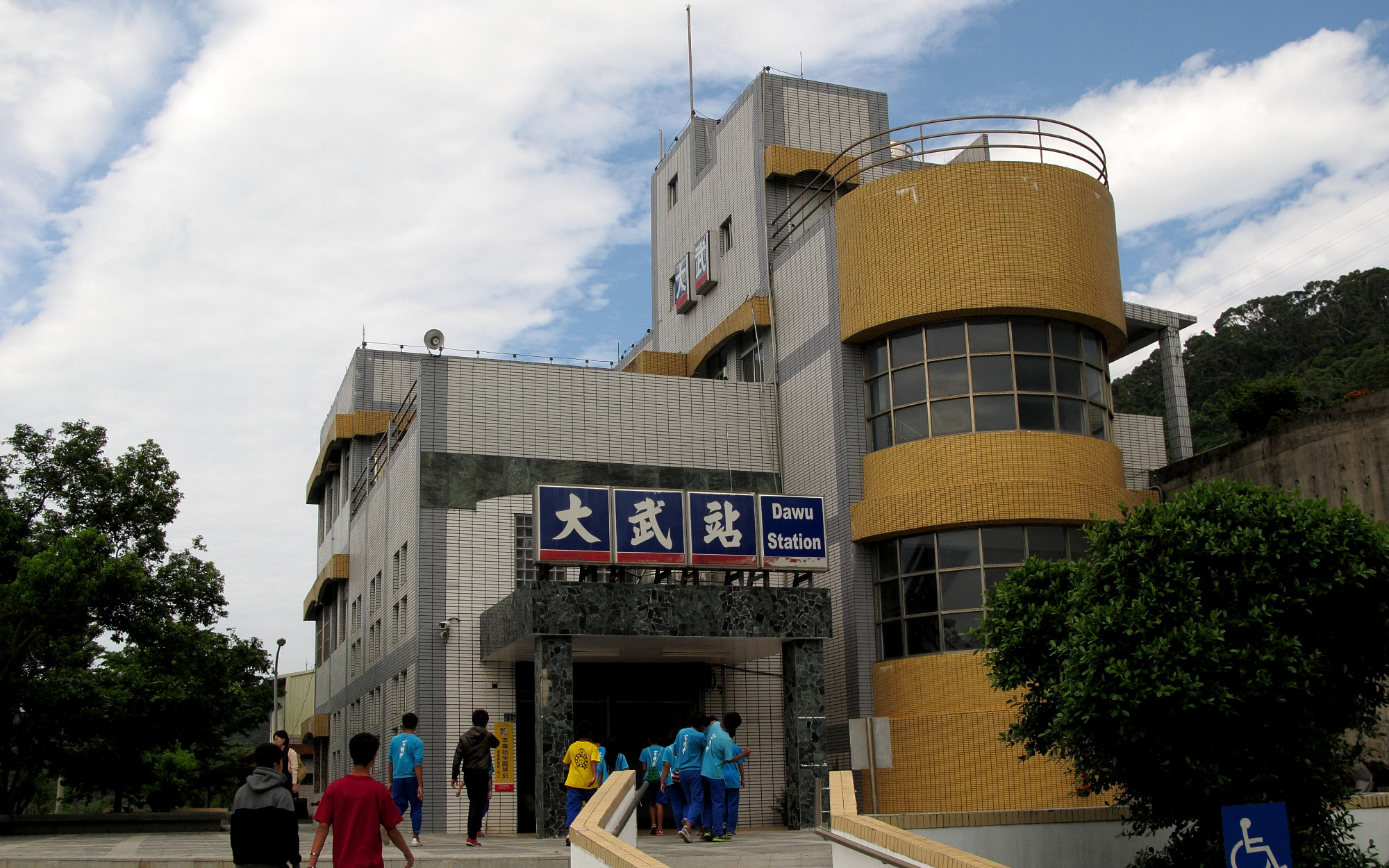

General information
- Location: Dawu, Taitung County, Taiwan
- Coordinates: 22°21′55.1″N 120°54′02.0″E
- System: Train station
- Owner: Taiwan Railway Corporation
- Operator: Taiwan Railway Corporation
- Line: South-link line
- Train operators: Taiwan Railway Corporation

History
- Opened: 5 October 1992

Passengers
- 409 daily (2024)
Location

Dawu (Chinese: 大武車站; pinyin: Dàwǔ Chēzhàn) is a railway station on Taiwan Railway (TR) South-link line located in Dawu Township, Taitung County, Taiwan.

== History ==
The station was opened on 5 October 1992.

== See also ==
- List of railway stations in Taiwan

Preceding station	Taiwan Railway	Following station
Guzhuang towards Pingtung	South-link line	Longxi towards Taitung
