= Shuangliu Forest Recreation Area =

Forest in Shizi, Pingtung County, Taiwan

Shuangliu Forest Recreation Area Chinese: 雙流國家森林遊樂區
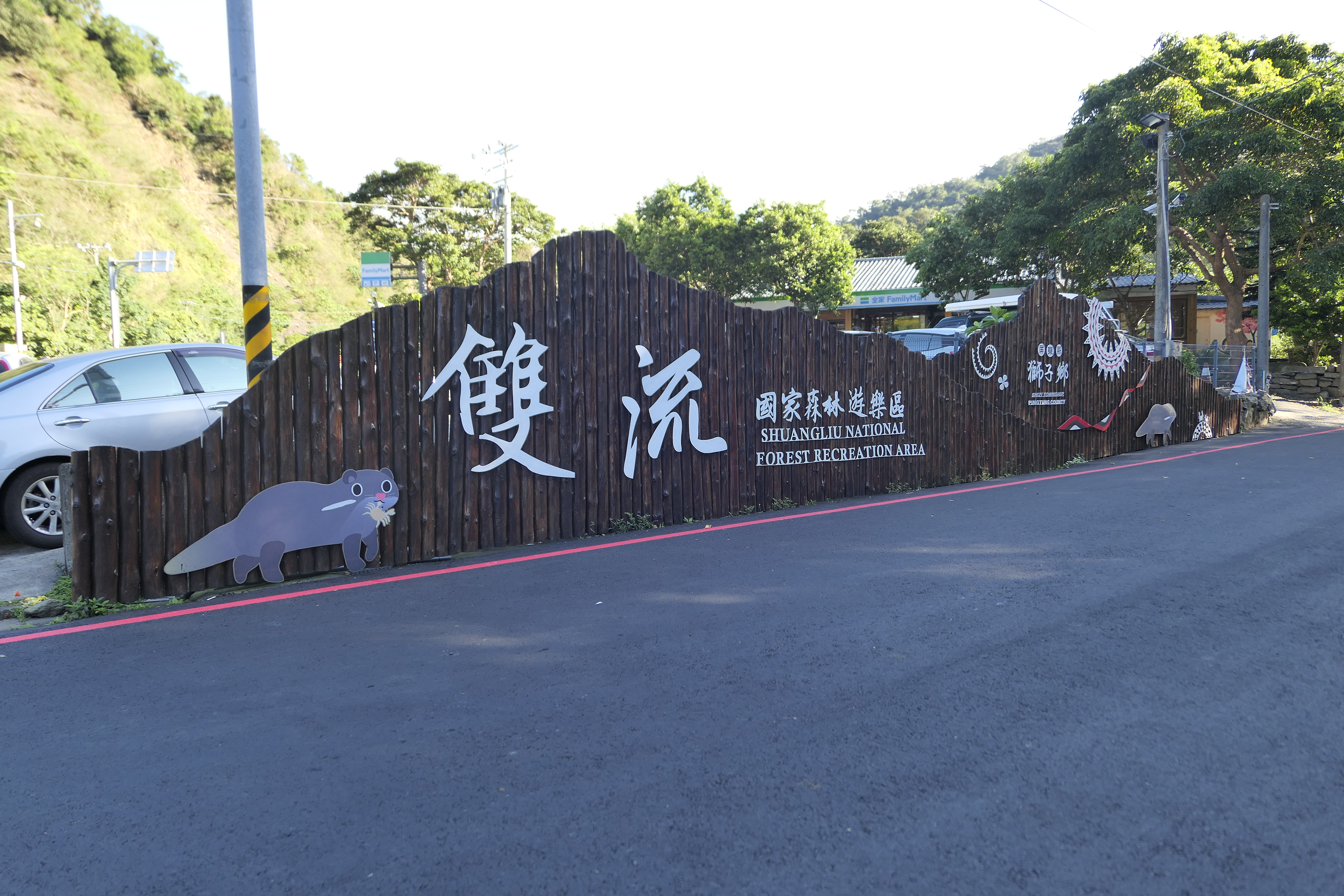
- a sign of Shuangliu Forest Recreation Area

- Location within Pingtung County
- Interactive map of Shuangliu Forest Recreation Area

Geography
- Location: Shizi, Pingtung County, Taiwan
- Coordinates: 22°12′58.5″N 120°47′58.4″E
- Elevation: 175–650 m (574–2,133 ft)
- Area: 6.5 km^{2} (2.5 sq mi)

Shuangliu Forest Recreation Area (traditional Chinese: 雙流國家森林遊樂區; simplified Chinese: 双流国家森林游乐区; pinyin: Shuāngliú Guójiā Sēnlín Yóulè Qū) is a forest in Caopu Village, Shizi Township, Pingtung County, Taiwan.

== Geology ==
The forest spans an area of 6.5 square kilometers (2.5 sq mi) at an elevation of 175–650 meters (574–2,133 ft) above sea level and annual mean temperature of 21 °C (70 °F). The highest point of the forest is Mount Maozi.

== Facilities ==
For hiking purpose, the forest consists of four different trails, which are the Banyan trail, mountainside trail, Mount Maozi trail and waterfall trail. It has other facilities such as the Forest Classroom, Power of Nature, a nature center and the Sunshine Lawn.

== Transportation ==
The forest is accessible by bus from Taitung Station of Taiwan Railway.

== See also ==
- Geography of Taiwan
