= Zhiben railway station =

Railway station in Taitung City, Taitung County, Taiwan

Zhiben Station 知本車站
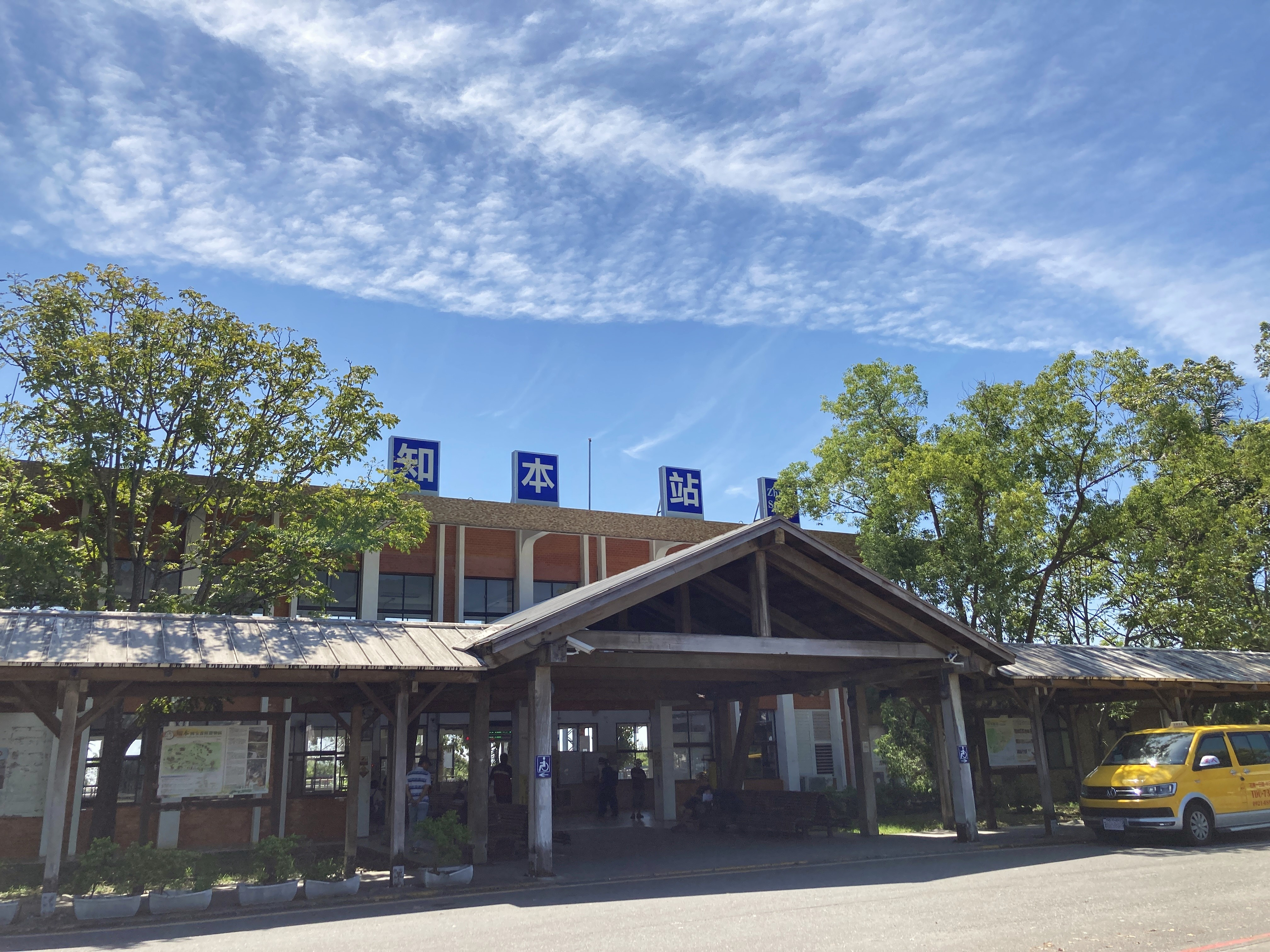

General information
- Location: Taitung City, Taitung County, Taiwan
- Coordinates: 22°42′37.1″N 121°03′39.8″E
- System: Train station
- Owner: Taiwan Railway Corporation
- Operator: Taiwan Railway Corporation
- Line: South-link line
- Train operators: Taiwan Railway Corporation

History
- Opened: 15 July 1985

Passengers
- 1,341 daily (2024)
Location

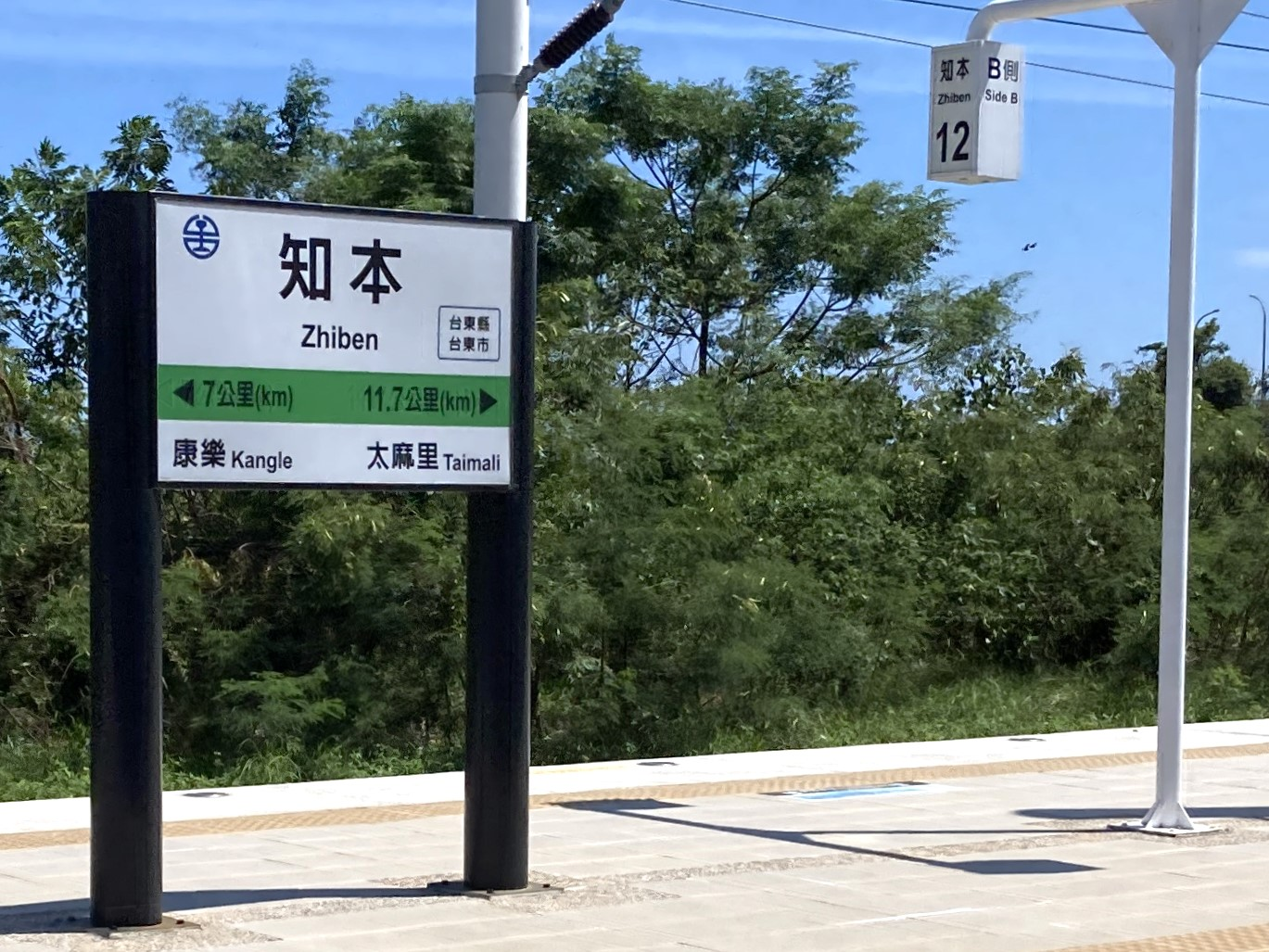
Zhiben station platform

Zhiben (Chinese: 知本車站; pinyin: Zhīběn Chēzhàn) is a railway station on Taiwan Railway South-link line located in Taitung City, Taitung County, Taiwan.

== History ==
The station was opened on 15 July 1985.

== Around the station ==
- Zhiben Wetlands

== See also ==
- List of railway stations in Taiwan

Preceding station	Taiwan Railway	Following station
Taimali towards Pingtung	South-link line	Kangle towards Taitung
