= Neishi railway station =

Railway station in Taiwan

Neishi Station 內獅車站
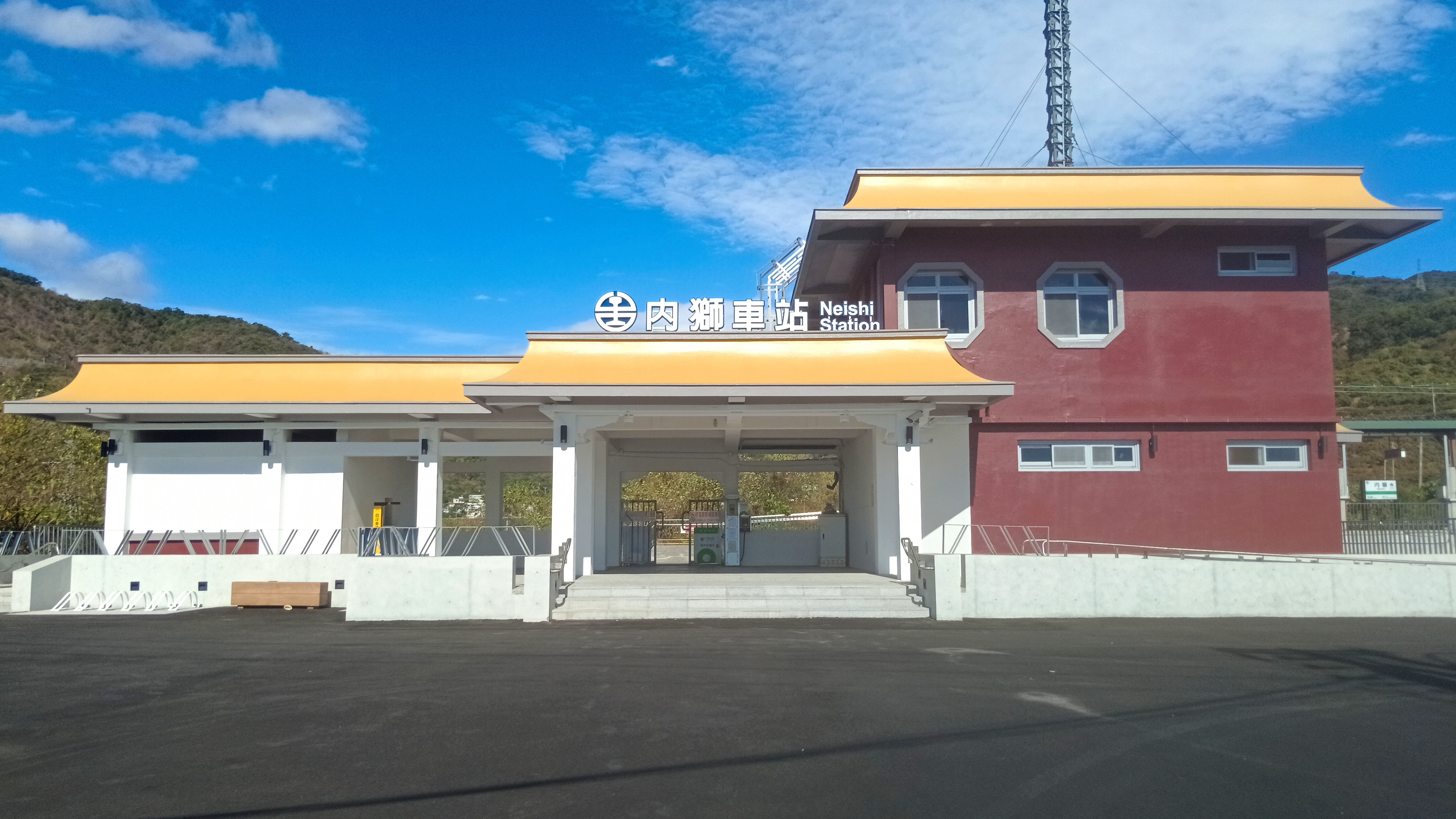

General information
- Location: Fangshan, Pingtung County, Taiwan
- Coordinates: 22.30623°N 120.643475°E
- System: Train station
- Owner: Taiwan Railway Corporation
- Operator: Taiwan Railway Corporation
- Line: South-link
- Platforms: 1 side platform (1 disused)
- Tracks: 1
- Train operators: Taiwan Railway Corporation

History
- Opened: 5 October 1992

Passengers
- 2 daily (2024)

Services
Preceding station	Taiwan Railway	Following station
Jialu towards Pingtung	South-link line	Fangshan towards Taitung
Location

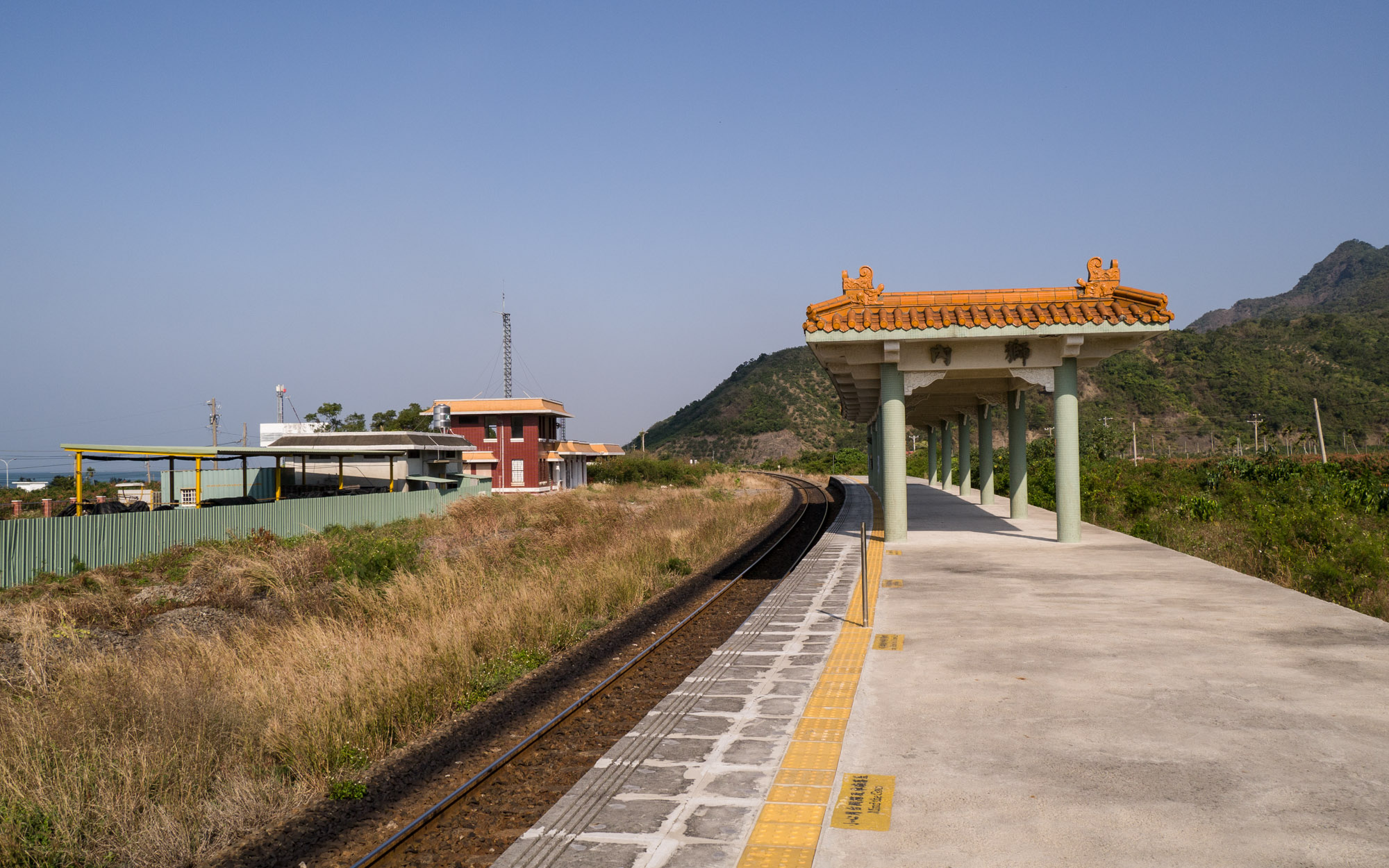
Neishi station platform

Neishi (Chinese: 內獅車站; pinyin: Nèishī Chēzhàn) is a railway station on the Taiwan Railway South-link line in Fangshan Township, Pingtung County, Taiwan.

In order to get to the platform from the train station, commuters have to cross the railway track. The station is unstaffed. The train station sees only four trains calling here, and many more trains passing by. In conjunction with the electrification works on the South-link line, a side platform was being constructed which allows commuters to get the platform without crossing the railway track. An elementary school is adjacent to the station, with an overhead footbridge connecting the school across the track. Although the bridge passes over the station, there is no direct access from the platform. The entrance to the station is off of Provincial Highway 1, which does not have any pedestrian accommodations.

== History ==
The station was opened on 5 October 1992.

== Usage ==
Neishi is the least used TRA station, according to The TRA Volume of Passenger & Freight Traffic report in 2015, with only 138 passengers getting on and 224 passengers alighting.

== See also ==
- List of railway stations in Taiwan
