= Kangle railway station =

Railway station in Taitung City, Taitung County, Taiwan

Kangle Station 康樂車站
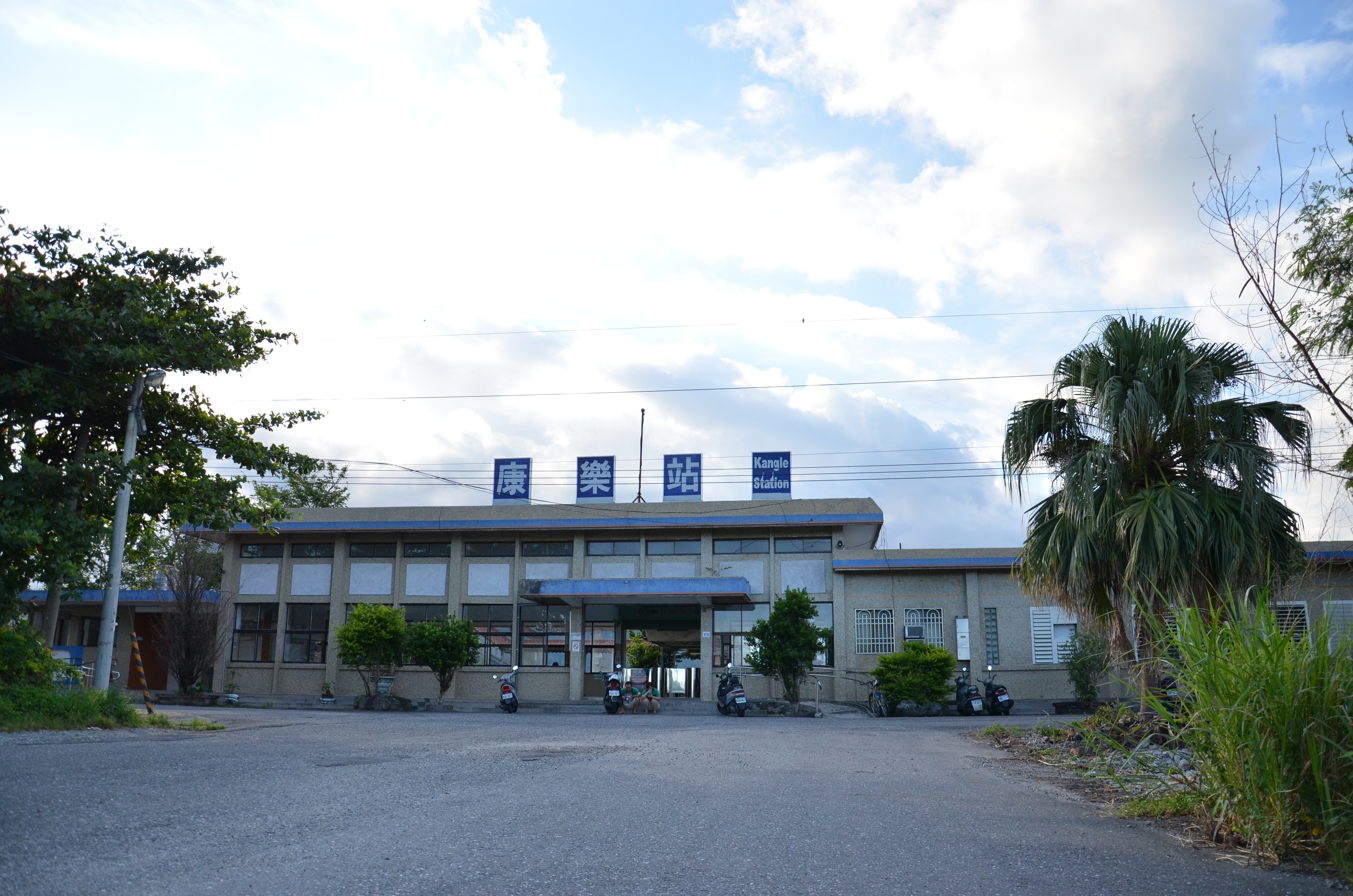

General information
- Location: Taitung City, Taitung County, Taiwan
- Coordinates: 22.793714°N 121.123148°E
- System: Train station
- Owner: Taiwan Railway Corporation
- Operator: Taiwan Railway Corporation
- Line: South-link
- Train operators: Taiwan Railway Corporation

History
- Opened: 15 July 1985

Passengers
- 37 daily (2024)
Location

Kangle (Chinese: 康樂車站; pinyin: Kānglè Chēzhàn) is a railway station on Taiwan Railway South-link line located in Taitung City, Taitung County, Taiwan. The daily usage in 2024 was 37 passengers, or 19 boarding passengers.

== History ==
The station was opened on 15 July 1985.

== Nearby stations ==
Taiwan Railways Administration
Zhiben <-- South-link line --> Taitung

== Around the station ==
- National Museum of Prehistory
- Taitung Airport

== See also ==
- List of railway stations in Taiwan

Preceding station	Taiwan Railway	Following station
Zhiben towards Pingtung	South-link line	Taitung Terminus
