= Central Signal railway station =

Railway station in Shizi, Pingtung County, Taiwan

Central Signal station 中央號誌站
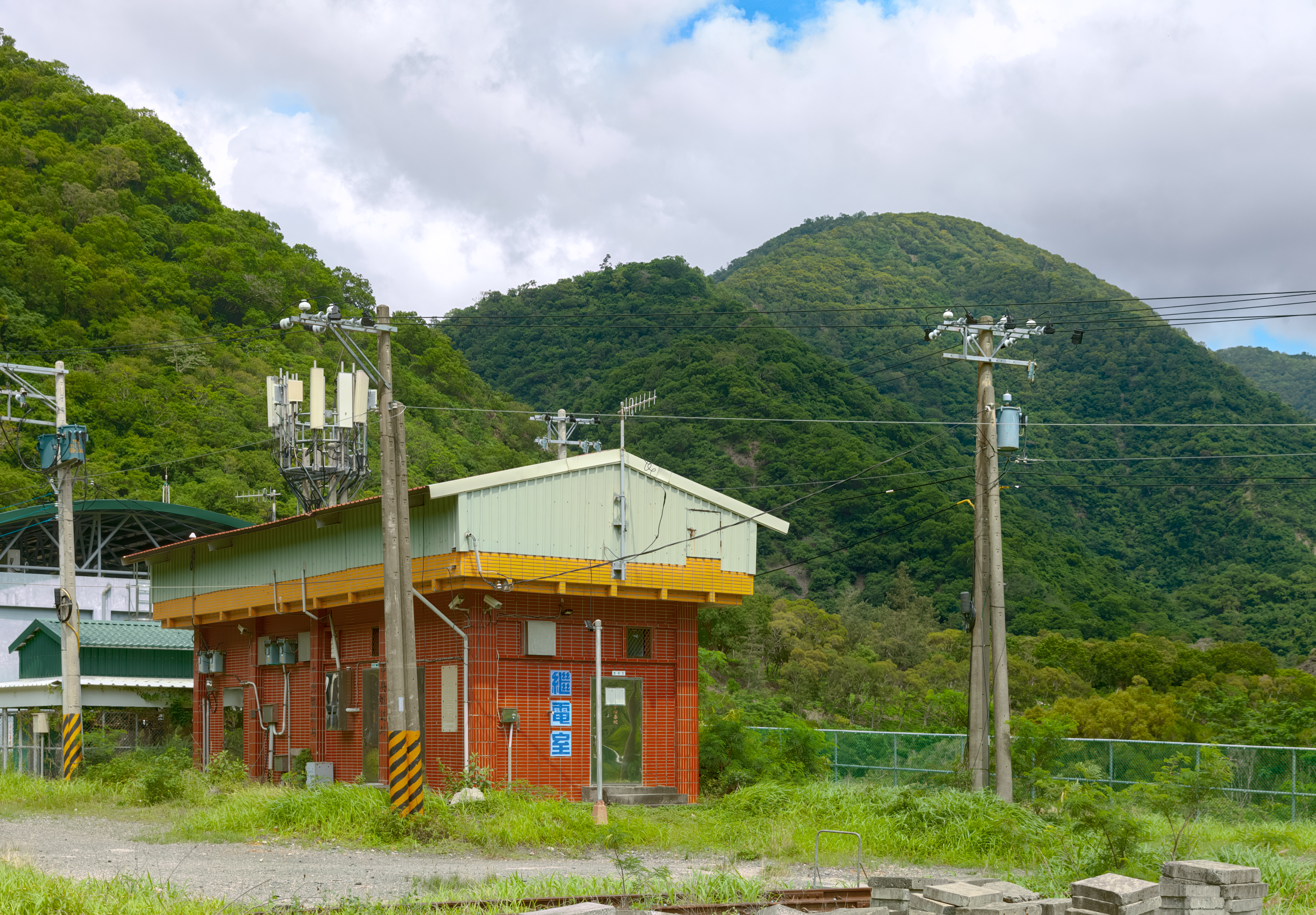

General information
- Location: Shizi, Pingtung County, Taiwan
- Coordinates: 22.275004°N 120.741551°E
- System: Train station
- Owner: Taiwan Railway Corporation
- Operator: Taiwan Railway Corporation
- Line: South-link
- Train operators: Taiwan Railway Corporation

History
- Opened: 5 October 1992
Location

Central Signal (Chinese: 中央號誌站; pinyin: Zhōngyāng Hàozhì Zhàn) is a railway station on Taiwan Railway (TR) South-link line located in Shizi Township, Pingtung County, Taiwan. The site is located outside the west gate of the Central Tunnel.

There is no station building; the only structure is a concrete facility housing relay and power equipment. There are no platforms; the site contains only a single No. 16 double-slip turnout (crossover switch). A safety siding is located on the north side of the eastbound main track to prevent collisions in the event that a train’s braking system fails. This is an unmanned signal station, with local control equipment managed from Fangye Station. It is used exclusively for train passing (meets/overtakes). No station staff are stationed here, and trains do not stop at the location for any purpose other than passing maneuvers or engineering/maintenance work.

== History ==
The station was opened on 5 October 1992.

== See also ==
- List of railway stations in Taiwan

| Preceding station | Taiwan Railway | Following station |
|---|---|---|
| Fangye towards Pingtung | South-link line | Pu'an Signal towards Taitung |
