= Fangshan railway station =

Railway stationin Shizi, Pingtung County, Taiwan

Fangshan Station 枋山車站
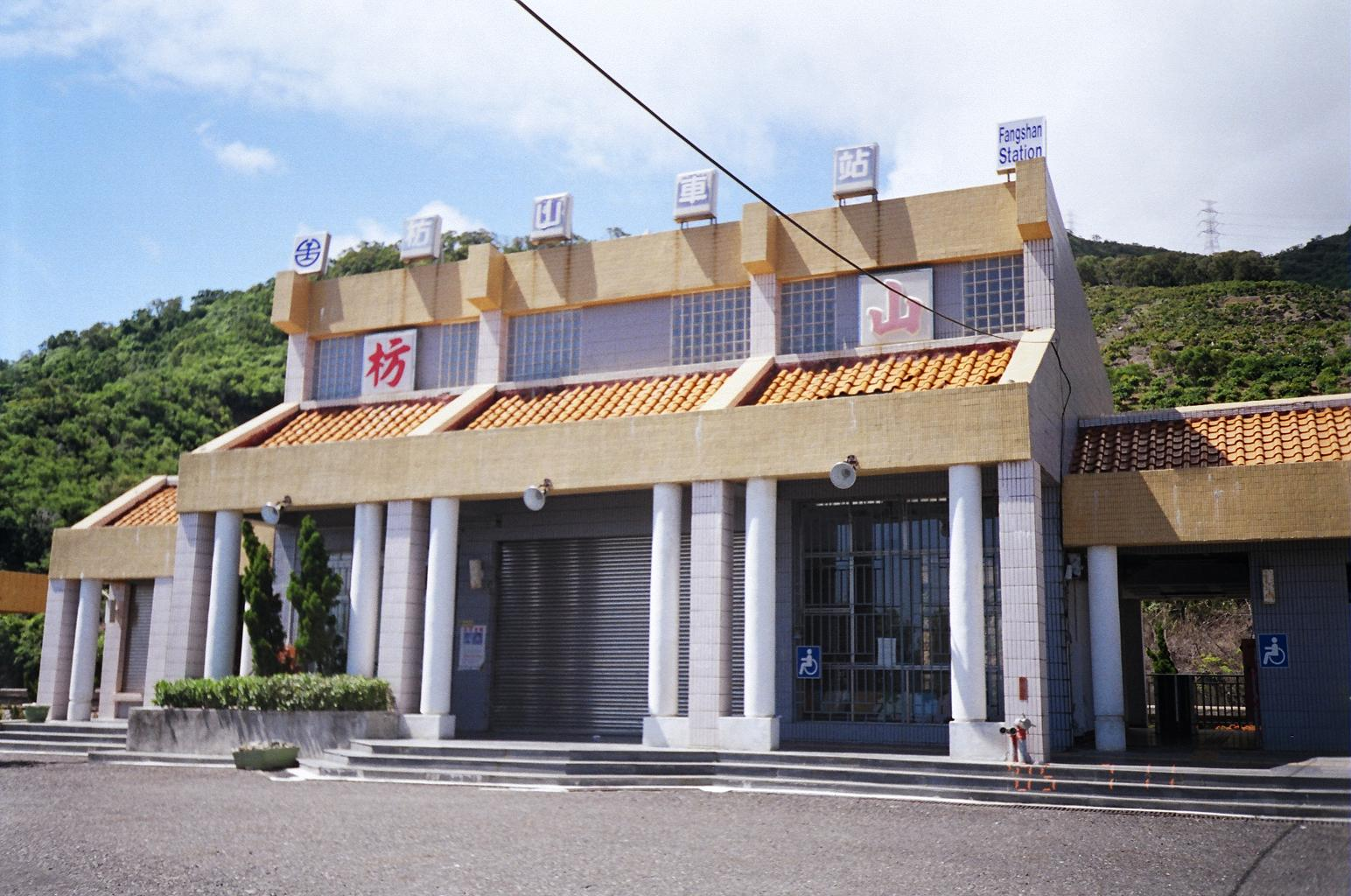

General information
- Location: Shizi, Pingtung County, Taiwan
- Coordinates: 22.267056°N 120.659445°E
- System: Train station
- Owner: Taiwan Railway Corporation
- Operator: Taiwan Railway Corporation
- Line: South-link
- Train operators: Taiwan Railway Corporation

History
- Opened: 5 October 1992

Passengers
- 4 daily (2024)
Location

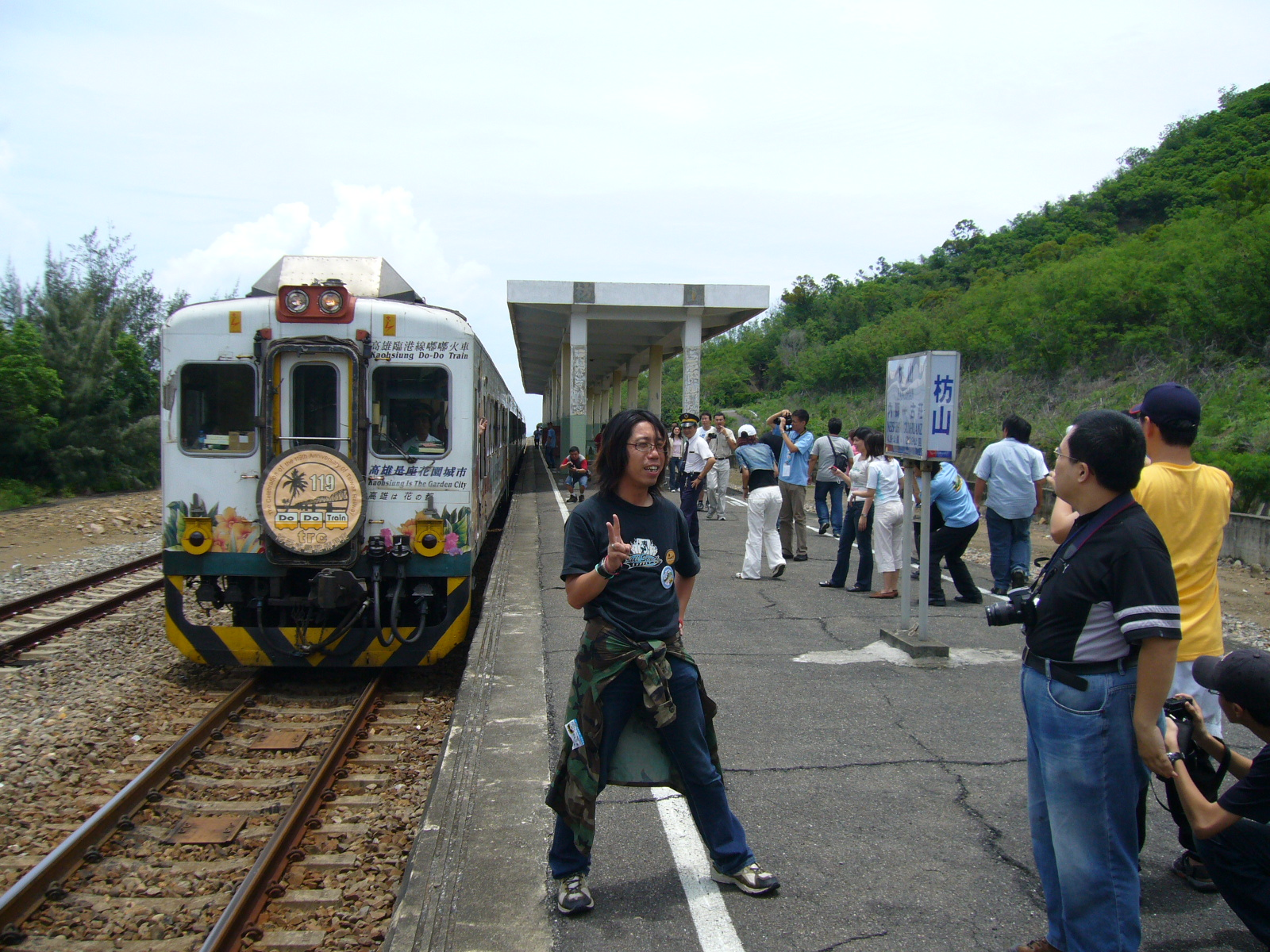
Fangshan station platform

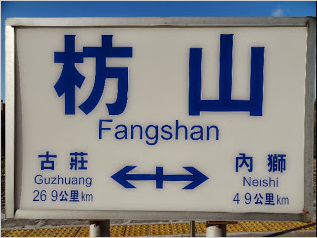
Fangshan station stop sign

Fangshan (Chinese: 枋山車站; pinyin: Fāngshān Chēzhàn) is a railway station on Taiwan Railway South-link line located in Shizi Township, Pingtung County, Taiwan. The station is unstaffed. It is the southernmost train station in Taiwan.

== History ==
The station was opened on 5 October 1992.

Renovations to Fangshan station's surroundings were scheduled to end in April 2021 as part of an ongoing effort in attracting tourists to the area.

== Passenger statistics ==
2014–2021 passenger statistics
Fiscal year	Annual	Daily avg.
2014	1,269	3
2015	1,197	3
2016	959	3
2017	1,133	3
2018	906	2
2019	1,295	4
2020	2,049	6
2021	822	2

== See also ==
- List of railway stations in Taiwan

Preceding station	Taiwan Railway	Following station
Neishi towards Pingtung	South-link line	Fangye towards Taitung
