= Guzhuang Signal railway station =

Taiwanese railway station

Guzhuang Station 古莊車站
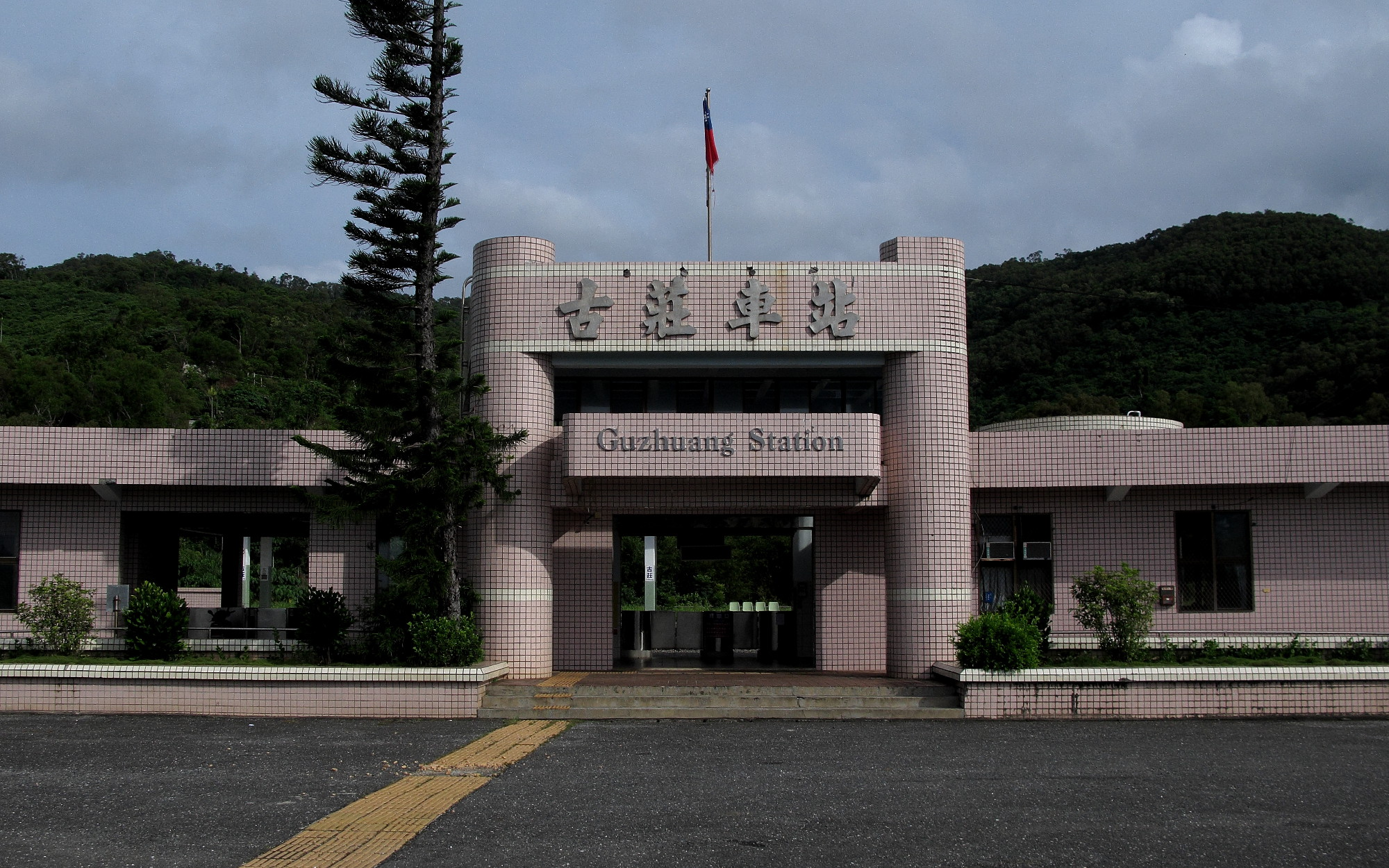

General information
- Location: Dawu, Taitung County, Taiwan
- Coordinates: 22.345561°N 120.877835°E
- System: Train station
- Owner: Taiwan Railway Corporation
- Operator: Taiwan Railway Corporation
- Line: South-link
- Train operators: Taiwan Railway Corporation

History
- Opened: 5 October 1992

Passengers
- 2017: 18 daily
Location

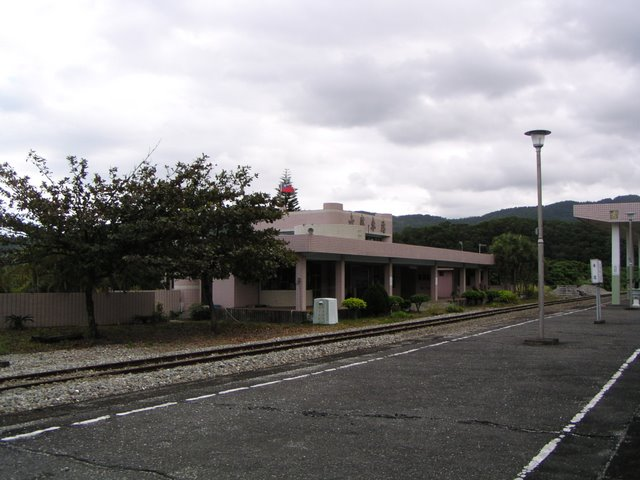
Guzhang station platform

Guzhuang (Chinese: 古莊車站; Hanyu Pinyin: Gǔzhuāng Chēzhàn; Tongyong Pinyin: Gǔjhuang Chejhàn) is a railway station on the Taiwan Railway South-link line located in Dawu Township, Taitung County, Taiwan.

== History ==
The station was opened for passengers on 5 October 1992. Due to the low utilization of the station by passengers over the years, the station was downgraded into a signal station in 2017.

== Trivia ==
Guzhuang is the second least-used TRA station, according to the TRA report on Volume of Passenger & Freight Traffic announced in 2015, with 281 passengers boarding and 470 passengers alighting.

== See also ==
- List of railway stations in Taiwan

Preceding station	Taiwan Railway	Following station
Central Signal towards Pingtung	South-link line	Dawu towards Taitung
