= Dawu, Taitung =

Rural township in Taitung County, Taiwan

Coordinates: 22°22′N 120°54′E

Dawu Township 大武鄉 Tawu
- Rural township
- A village along the coast in Dawu Township

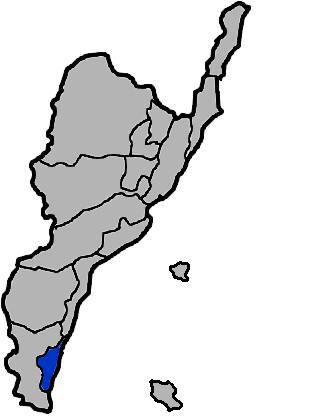
- Dawu Township in Taitung County
- Location: Taitung County, Taiwan

Area
  - Total: 69 km^{2} (27 sq mi)

Population (September 2023)
  - Total: 5,577
  - Density: 81/km^{2} (210/sq mi)

Dawu Township (Chinese: 大武鄉; pinyin: Dàwǔ Xiāng; Wade–Giles: Ta^{4}-wu^{3} Hsiang^{1}) is a rural township in Taitung County, Taiwan.

The majority inhabitants of the township are the indigenous Paiwan people.

== Administrative divisions ==
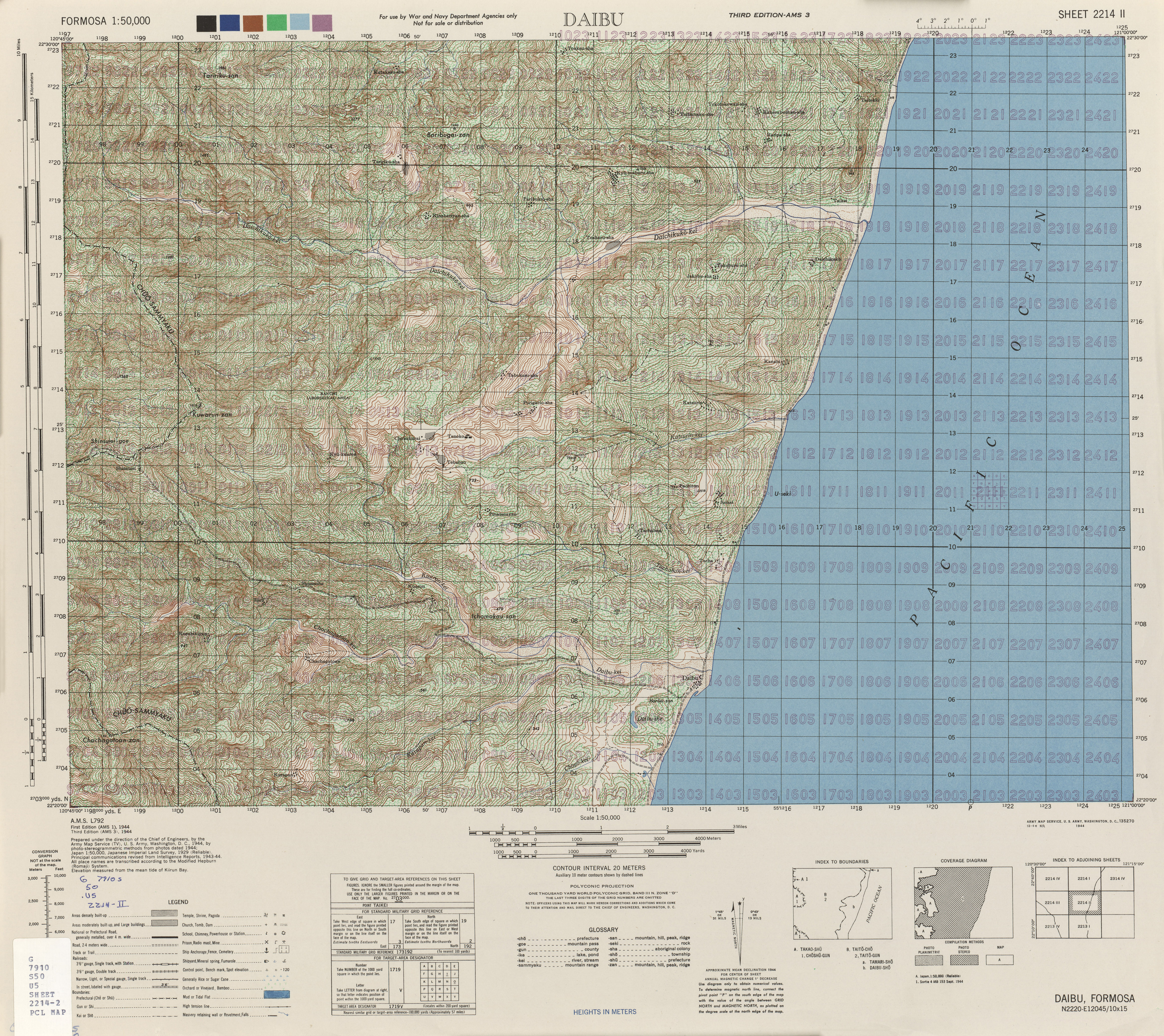
Map of Dawu (labeled as Daibu) and surrounding region (AMS, 1944)

The township comprises five villages: Dajhu, Daniao, Dawu, Nanhsing and Shangwu. The indigenous names for these communities are Tjuwacuqa, Pacavalj, Palangwi, Madjanadjanau, and Qudjaqas.

== Climate ==
Dawu has a tropical monsoon climate. The township is known for its extreme heat due to Foehn wind effects during the daytime especially during the summer months. On 25 July 2020, Dawu recorded a temperature of 40.2 °C (104.4 °F), which is the highest temperature to have ever been recorded in Taiwan.

Climate data for Dawu (1991–2020 normals, extremes 1940–present）
Month	Jan	Feb	Mar	Apr	May	Jun	Jul	Aug	Sep	Oct	Nov	Dec	Year
Record high °C (°F)	33.0 (91.4)	34.4 (93.9)	37.6 (99.7)	38.9 (102.0)	39.4 (102.9)	38.7 (101.7)	40.2 (104.4)	37.8 (100.0)	37.1 (98.8)	36.6 (97.9)	34.5 (94.1)	32.7 (90.9)	40.2 (104.4)
Mean daily maximum °C (°F)	23.7 (74.7)	24.4 (75.9)	26.2 (79.2)	28.7 (83.7)	30.7 (87.3)	32.6 (90.7)	32.8 (91.0)	32.3 (90.1)	31.2 (88.2)	29.4 (84.9)	27.4 (81.3)	24.6 (76.3)	28.7 (83.6)
Daily mean °C (°F)	20.5 (68.9)	21.0 (69.8)	22.5 (72.5)	24.7 (76.5)	26.6 (79.9)	28.3 (82.9)	28.7 (83.7)	28.2 (82.8)	27.4 (81.3)	26.0 (78.8)	24.2 (75.6)	21.6 (70.9)	25.0 (77.0)
Mean daily minimum °C (°F)	17.7 (63.9)	18.2 (64.8)	19.6 (67.3)	21.6 (70.9)	23.5 (74.3)	25.0 (77.0)	25.3 (77.5)	25.1 (77.2)	24.3 (75.7)	23.0 (73.4)	21.4 (70.5)	19.0 (66.2)	22.0 (71.6)
Record low °C (°F)	10.1 (50.2)	10.0 (50.0)	11.8 (53.2)	14.4 (57.9)	17.7 (63.9)	18.4 (65.1)	21.4 (70.5)	19.2 (66.6)	19.9 (67.8)	16.6 (61.9)	11.1 (52.0)	10.7 (51.3)	10.0 (50.0)
Average precipitation mm (inches)	42.5 (1.67)	44.3 (1.74)	42.8 (1.69)	72.4 (2.85)	174.7 (6.88)	367.5 (14.47)	388.1 (15.28)	458.2 (18.04)	391.4 (15.41)	203.3 (8.00)	92.9 (3.66)	46.4 (1.83)	2,324.5 (91.52)
Average precipitation days (≥ 0.1 mm)	10.9	10.8	10.5	11.0	13.1	13.3	12.8	14.8	15.6	13.1	9.8	9.9	145.6
Average relative humidity (%)	70.9	72.5	72.9	74.6	77.0	76.7	76.9	78.3	77.3	72.2	70.7	69.2	74.1
Mean monthly sunshine hours	106.7	103.3	124.7	142.1	168.4	209.4	238.6	207.8	171.4	161.8	132.6	106.9	1,873.7
Source: Central Weather Bureau

== Tourist attractions ==
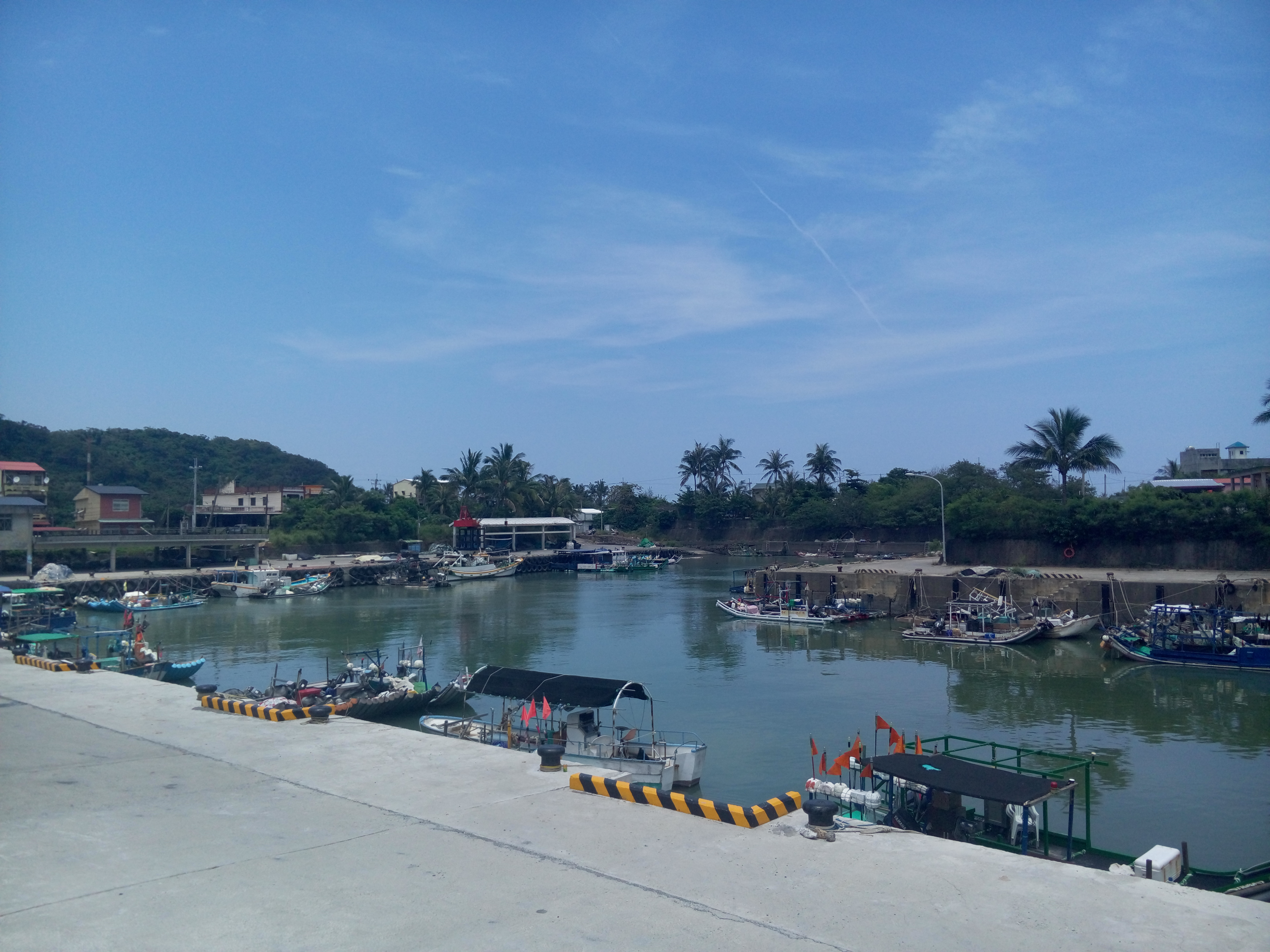
Dawu Fishing Harbor

- Aboriginal Specialization Area
- Dajhu Recreation Area
- Daniao Recreation Area
- Daniao Seaside Original Forest
- Daniao Village Rukou Park
- Dawu Beach Park
- Dawu Fishing Harbor
- Dawu Recreation Coast Fish Market
- Duoliang Station
- Ji-asiou Recreation Area
- Jinlonghu Scenic Area
- Shanjhuku Recreation Farm
- Wangyou Pavilion
- Yuanshan Recreation Area

== Transportation ==
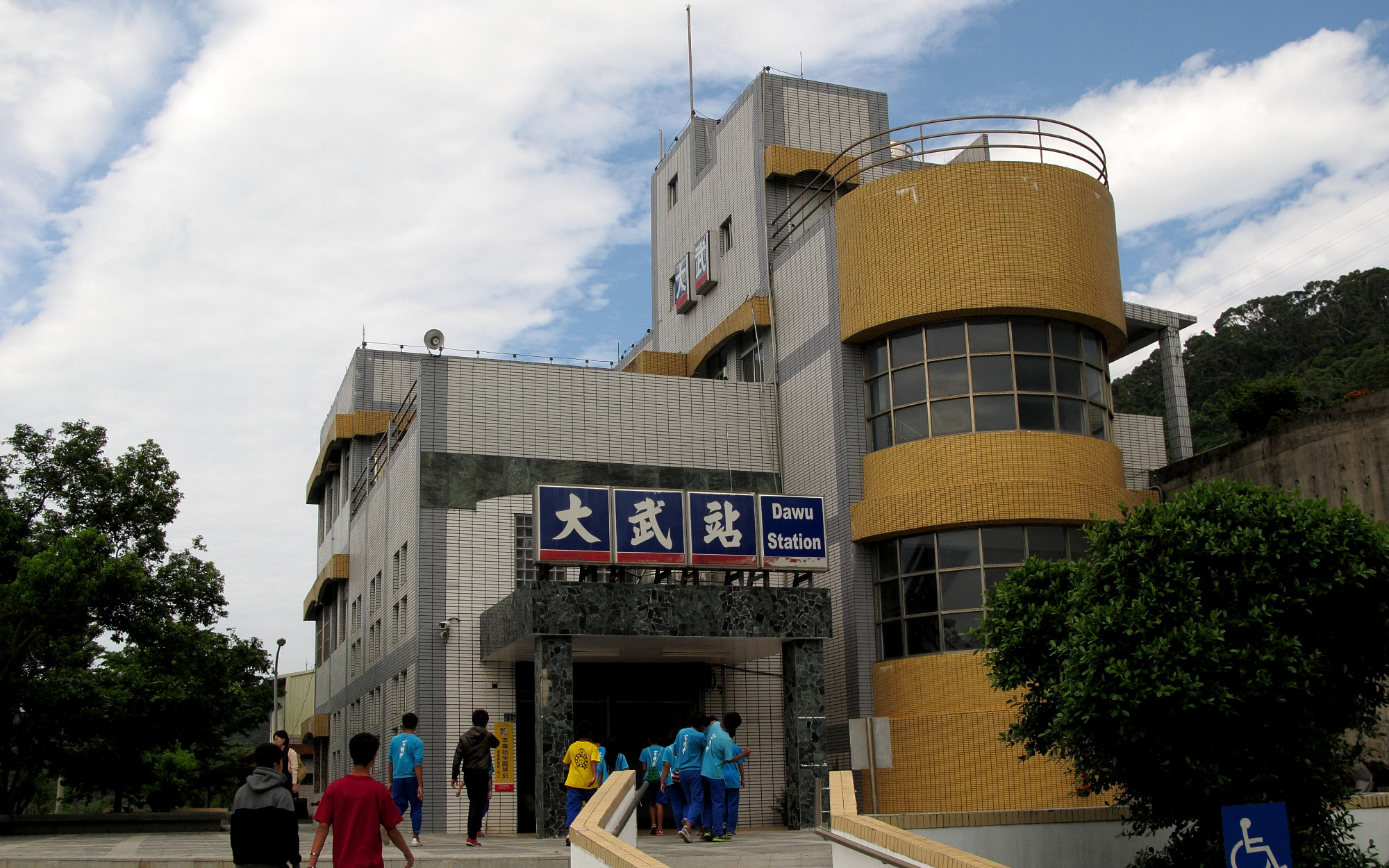
TRA Dawu Station

Dawu Township is accessible from Dawu Station and Guzhuang Station of Taiwan Railway.
