= Shizi, Pingtung =

Mountain indigenous township in Pingtung County, Taiwan

Coordinates: 22.2018°N 120.7054°E

Shizi Township 獅子鄉
- Mountain indigenous township
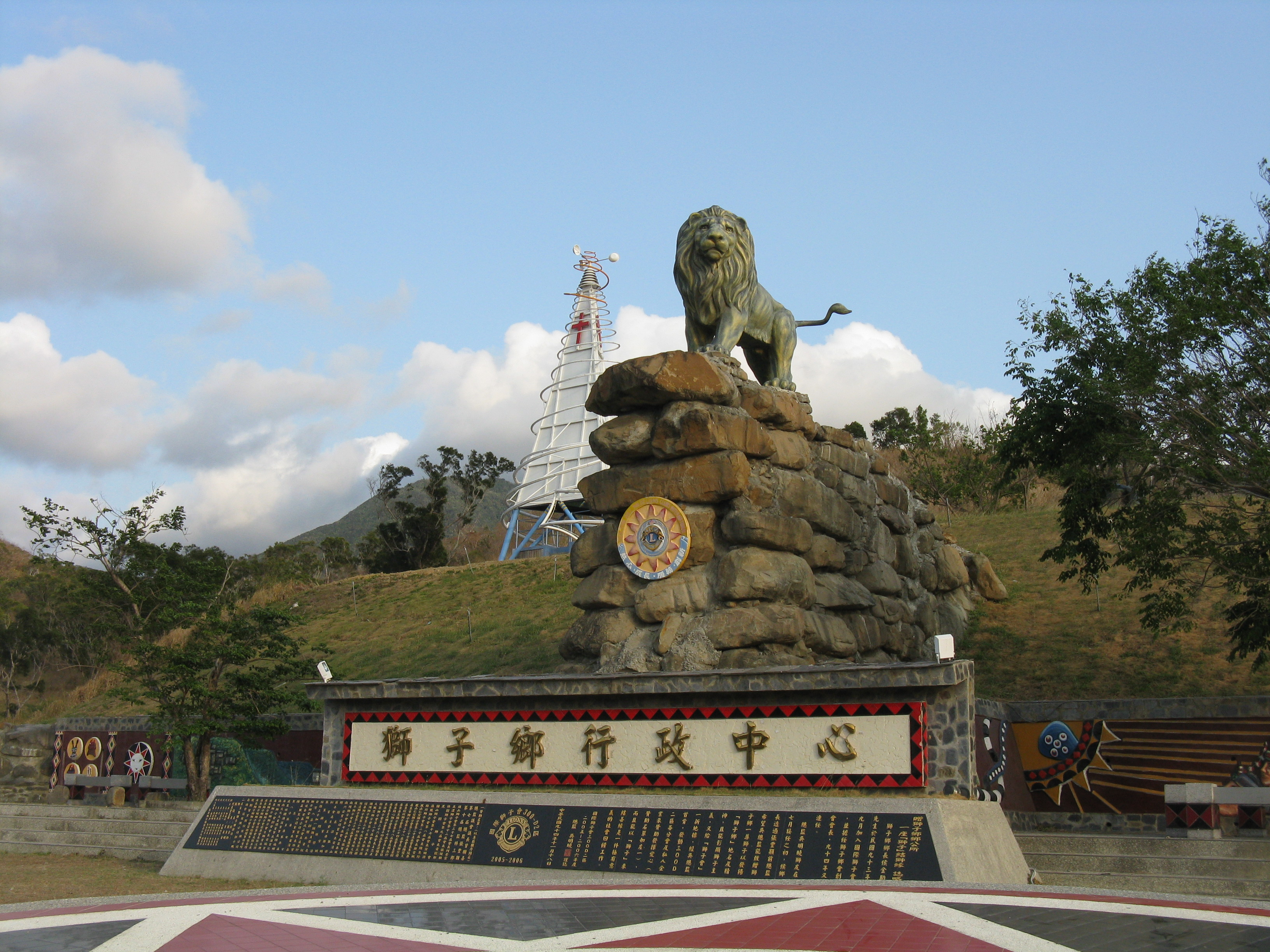

- Shizi Township in Pingtung County
- Location: Pingtung County, Taiwan

Area
  - Total: 301 km^{2} (116 sq mi)

Population (February 2024)
  - Total: 4,768
  - Density: 15.8/km^{2} (41.0/sq mi)

Shizi Township

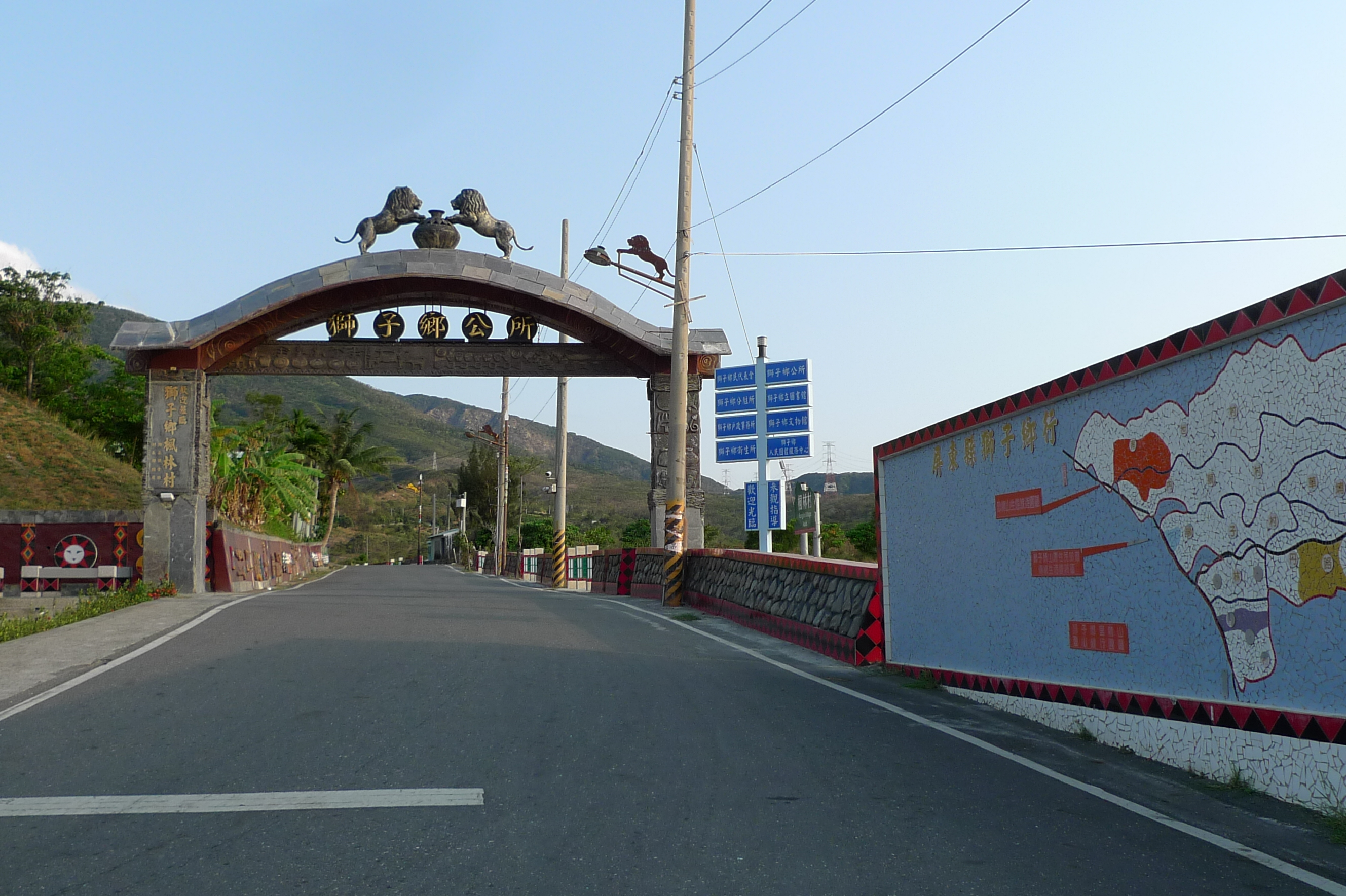
Entrance to Shizi Township Hall

Shizi Township is a mountain indigenous township in Pingtung County, Taiwan. It is the largest township of the county. The main population is the Paiwan people of the Taiwanese aborigines.

== Names ==
The original Paiwan name for the area was Tjakuvukuvulj (Tjakuvukuvuɬ; historically rendered as Chaobo Obol or in Chinese: 大龜文). Han Chinese settlers noted a rock outcropping in the shape of a lion's head (Chinese: 獅仔頭山; Pe̍h-ōe-jī: Sai-á-thâu-soaⁿ; lit. 'lion-head mountain') and called the village Sai-a-thau-sia (獅仔頭社; Sai-á-thâu-siā; 'lion-head village').

Under Kuomintang rule, the name was changed to the current Shizi, though in Taiwanese Hokkien the name Sai-a-thau is still normally used in spoken contexts.

== Geography ==
The terrain of Shizi is mountainous, as the district is located near Taiwan's Central Mountain Range.

== Administrative divisions ==
The township comprises eight villages:

- Caopu (Chinese: 草埔; pinyin: Cǎobù; Pe̍h-ōe-jī: Chháu-po) (Paiwan: Supaw)
- Danlu (丹路; Dānlù; Tan-lō) (Paiwan: Tjakuljakuljai)
- Fenglin (楓林; Fēnglín; Png-lîm)(Paiwan: Kaidi/Naimalipa)
- Nanshi (南世; Nánshì; Lâm-sè) (Paiwan: Nansiku/Tjuladu)
- Neishi (內獅; Nèishī; Lāi-sai) (Paiwan: Kacedas)
- Neiwen (內文; Nèiwén; Lāi-bûn) (Paiwan: Naibun/Tjakuvukuvulj)
- Shizi (獅子; Shīzi; Sai-chú) (Paiwan: Tjaqaciljai)
- Zhukeng (竹坑; Zhúkēng; Tek-kheⁿ) (Paiwan: Tjuruguai)

== Economy ==
=== Agriculture ===
Agriculture produced in the township includes mangoes, bird's-nest ferns and watermelons.

== Tourist attractions ==
Places of interest in or around Shizi are Shuangliu Forest Recreation Area, the Cultural Objects Museum, Lilongshan and Neiwen Village.

== Transportation ==
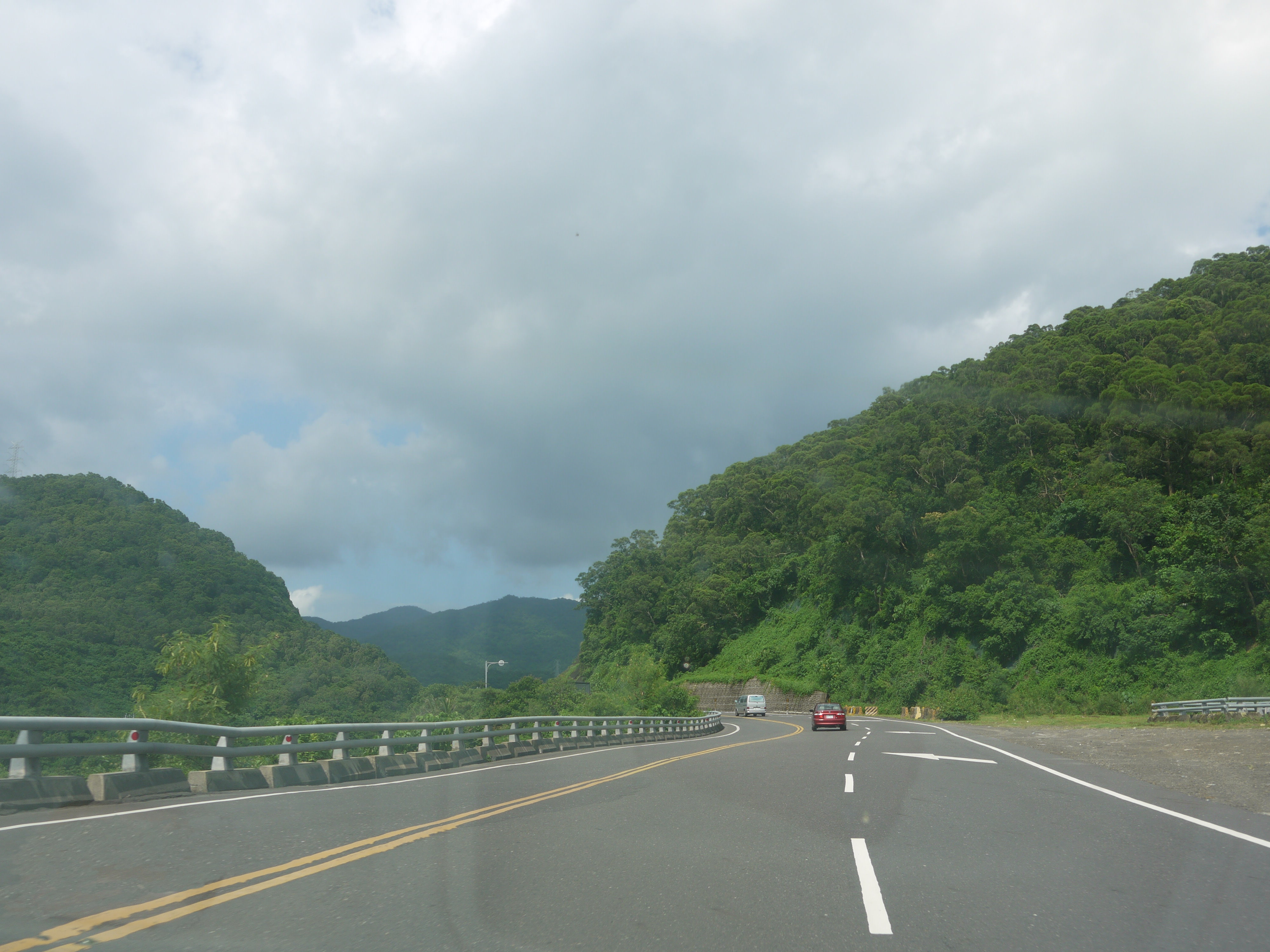
The South-Link Highway passing through Shizi Township

Shizi is connected via railway through the TR South-Link Line. A key station is Fangshan Station. Two highways run through the township: Provincial Highway No.1 and Provincial Highway No.9 (South-Link Highway).
