= Taitung Miramar Resort =

- 美麗灣渡假村
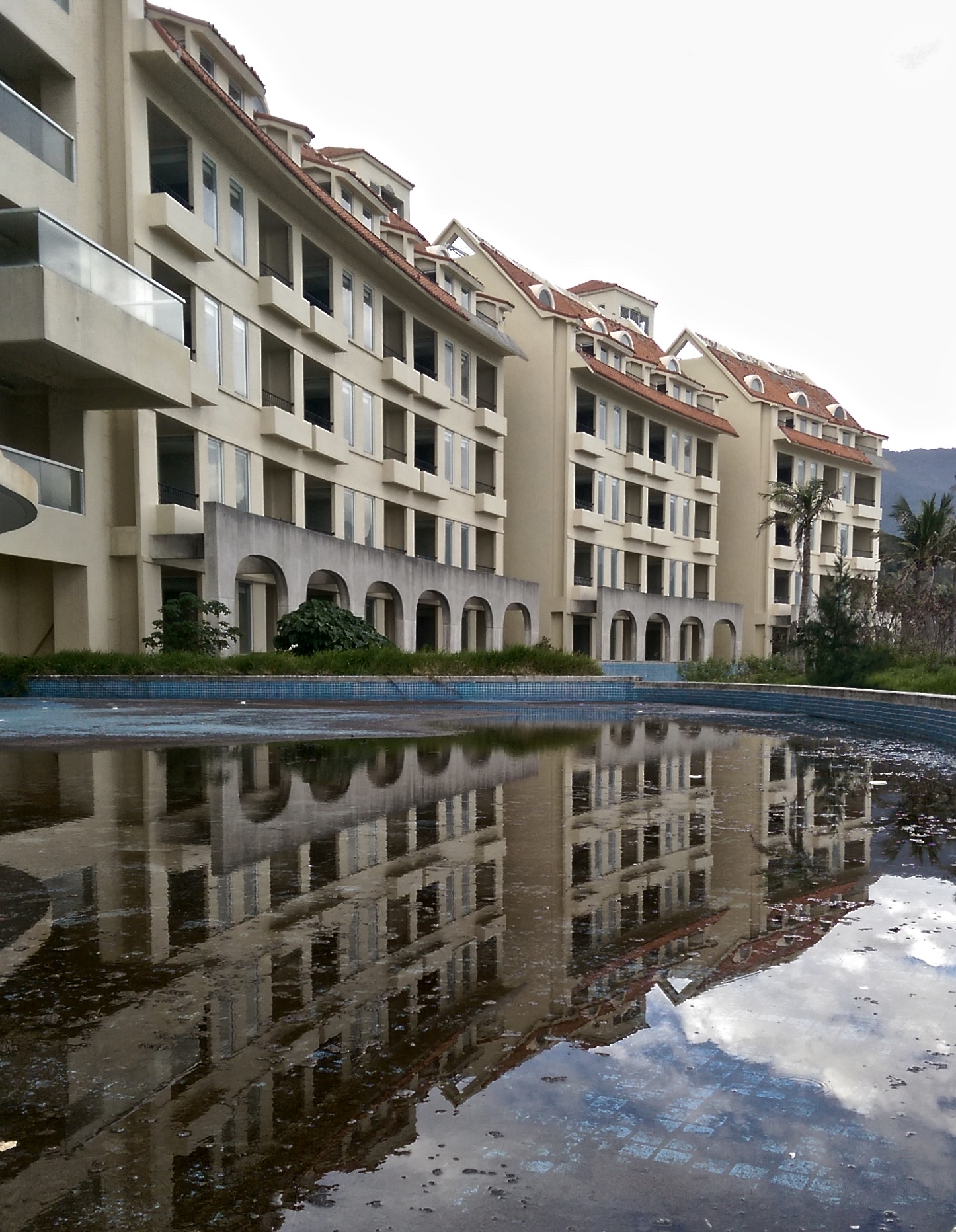
- Interactive map of the Taitung Miramar Resort area

General information
- Type: Resort
- Location: Beinan, Taitung County, Taiwan
- Coordinates: 22°49′52.4″N 121°11′07.3″E
- Construction started: 28 March 2005

Taitung Miramar Resort (Chinese: 美麗灣渡假村; pinyin: Měilì Wān Dùjià Cūn) is a BOT (Build Operate Transfer) development on Shanyuan (杉原灣)/Fudafudak in Beinan Township, Taitung County, Taiwan. In 2004, a contract was signed by Miramar Resort Taitung Ltd (majority owned by Huang Chun-fa) and the Taitung County Government under then County Magistrate Hsu Ching-yuan. It was supported by three subsequently elected magistrates. Although still standing, Miramar was unable to open due to Supreme Court rulings relating to the legality of its construction.

== BOT approval ==
In 2003, the Taitung County Government received Central Government permission to employ the BOT model to demolish the change room and camping facilities at Shanyuan/Fudafudak and build a ‘theme restaurant’ and new change-room facilities in conjunction with a private partner. This was unusual as BOT schemes are generally reserved for major infrastructure projects such as subway systems and toll roads. At the time, Hsu Ching-yuan was three years into his first term as County Magistrate while Justin Huang was the newly elected Taitung representative in the Central Government Legislature.

The development area was divided into the theme restaurant and beach area.

Deemed a minor development, it was classified as ‘General’ rather than ‘International Tourism’ which meant that the Taitung Government was granted control of the project. If ‘International Tourism’, the Central Government would have retained control. Subsequently, private companies were invited to tender for the rights to build and manage the project.

=== Durban Development ===
Durban Development Company Ltd. (Chinese: 德安開發) is a descendant company from Miramar Group (Chinese: 美麗華集團), which, according to the China Post, "consists of subdivisions owned by different members within the giant, extended Huang family”

In early 2004, Durban Development Company became involved in the Shanyuan/Fudafudak redevelopment bidding process. From this point, the land usage purpose entered an adjustment period. Durban's proposal included, in addition to the restaurant and change rooms, a 50-room hotel. In July 2004, the Taitung County Government announced the project description had been adjusted to “seaside resort”, with a maximum of 80-rooms.

Two months later, Miramar/Durban was chosen as the best applicant (it is unclear if there were other tenders), whereupon Huang Chun-fa (and/or his representatives) obtained the right to negotiate the contract. A consortium called Miramar Resort Taitung Ltd (美麗灣度假村股份有限公司) was formed that included a 45% investment stake by Naruwan Hotel (娜魯灣飯店), owned by Lin Yen-huang (林炎煌).

=== The contract ===
In December 2004, Magistrate Hsu Ching-yuan signed a contract with Miramar Resort Ltd for the rights to manage Shanyuan/Fudafudak and build an 80-room resort. The building to land coverage ratio was 6.5% and the floor to land ratio was 19.8%. Miramar was required to pay a royalty fee of NT$5 million (@ NT$100 000 per year, US$3125) for the management rights, as well as 2% of yearly earnings to the Taitung Government. Furthermore, the resort building as well as beach usage rights would be transferred back free of charge to the county government after 50 years.

In addition to management rights, the Taitung Government agreed to lease Shanyuan/Fudafudak to Miramar/Durban at the nominal rate of NT$30 000 (US$938) per month in order to facilitate the profitability of the project. According to the Ministry of Finance's BOT guidelines, Miramar was required to “provide sustainable and quality public service.” The Taitung Government would be the competent authority supervising the legality of the project.

Construction began on March 28, 2005.

== Taitung coastline ==
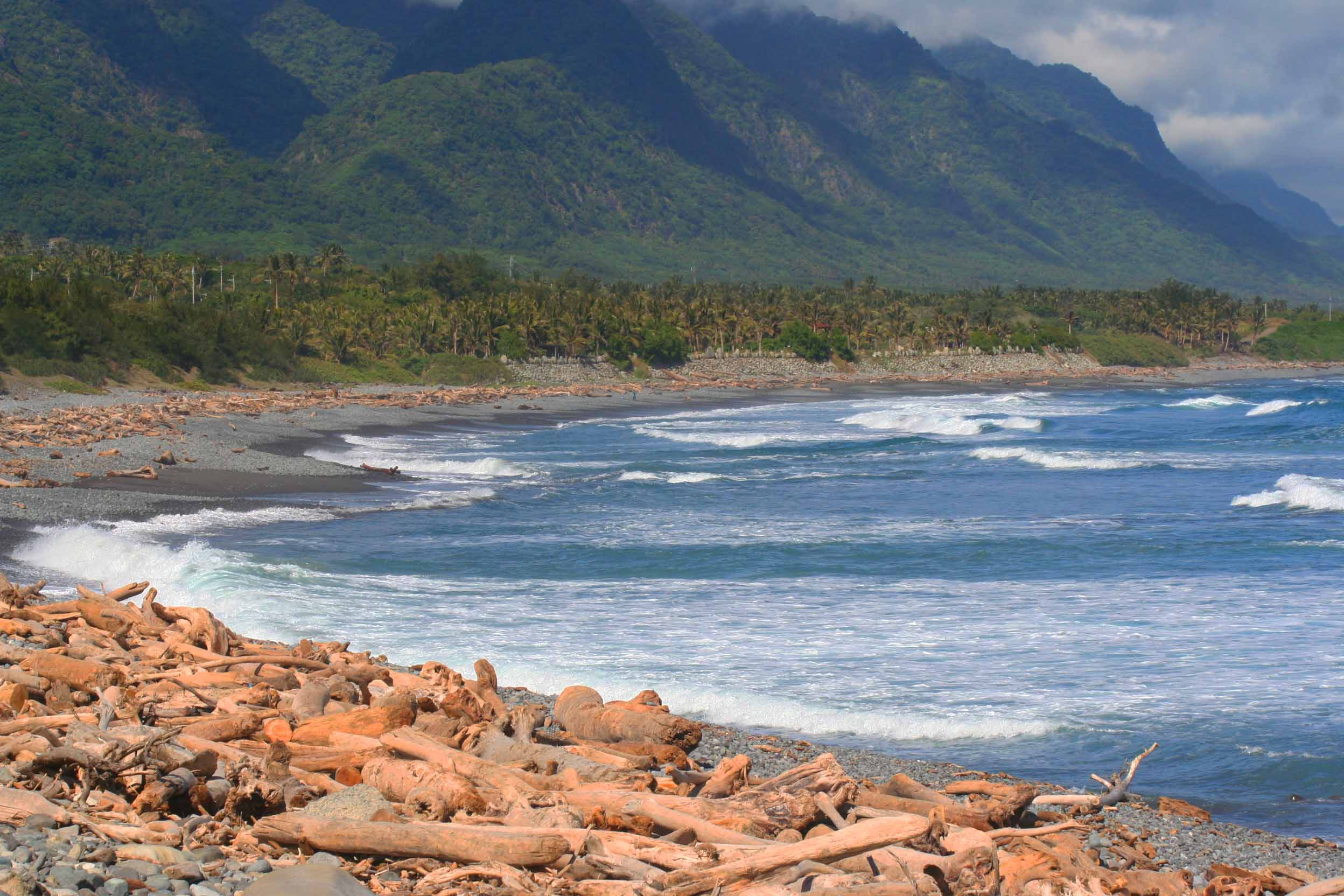
Driftwood on Taitung County coast

Whereas the northern, western, and southern coastlines of Taiwan have seen land development leading to degradation of the coastal environment, the southeast coast's rugged natural beauty also renders it the least accessible to large developers. According to Lonely Planet:

This status as the last stretch of undeveloped coastline, much of it "nationally designated traditional territory of the Amis tribe" (Chen, 2015) presented two sides of the coin: both reason for conserving the area, and reason for development in that it is following precedent. As Deputy Speaker Chen noted: "If Kenting has been allowed to cover the beach with hotels, why can't we do it Taitung?"

Kenting to the south in Pingtung County, and Taitung's Zhiben Hot Spring offer the most recent models of coastal resort development in Taiwan.

== Indigenous background ==
There are 16 officially recognized indigenous ethnic groups of Taiwan. Classified as Austronesian peoples, their descendants inhabited the island about 5000 years before the arrival of the Han Chinese. Although the percentage of indigenous in Taiwan today is only 2.35%, in Taitung County it is 35.7%. In east coast villages outside Taitung city, the figure is around 50% or higher, mostly consisting of Amis tribe members.

Within the 16 indigenous ethnic groups, the buluo (indigenous village) functions as the central mechanism of indigenous culture. Before and during colonization, buluo formed and settled in particular geological areas suitable for habitation. (Chen 2015) Having experienced an accumulating period of cultural weakening, the mid-1990s saw the beginning of a resurgence amongst indigenous communities in Taitung. (Futuru 2010)

The Fudafuduk/Shanyuan area is inhabited by the Tse-tung (Erythrina) buluo from the Amis tribe. The annual Amis ocean worship festival, Palaylay (Ilisin, 海祭), is held on the beach during summer. The sheltered coral reef bay provides a food gathering resource, and serves as a training ground for youth in food identification, fishing, diving, and boating skills. Significant archeological sites are located in the surrounding area dating back to the Neolithic period, approximately 2000–4000 years ago. Shanyuan/Fudafudak is designated indigenous territory. According to Taiwan's Basic Aboriginal Law (2005), such areas require consultation with the traditional custodians before changes to land rezoning and/or usage can take place. (Chen 2015)

== Huang Chun-fa, chairman of Taitung Miramar Resort ==
The beneficiary of any payout would be the Miramar/Durban Development companies owned by Huang Chun-fa, "...a second-generation business leader in the Huang clan, which controls the Miramar Group". Whereas other branches of the Miramar Huang family have led high-profile lives played out through the media, Business Today noted, "the style of the Huang Jung-hua (branch of) Huangs has always been low-key."

In 2004, Huang Chun-fa's companies were quietly awarded government hotel construction/management tenders in Taipei, Hsinchu and Taitung:

Two years later the China Post reported:

“Luckily for the group, they didn't need to purchase land...The Tourism Bureau decided to provide land to private investors using the build, operate transfer (BOT) model. After 50 years, these hotels are required to be returned to the government... The powerful Miramar Group - which controls a wide range of businesses ... from department stores to real estate to petrol stations - was famous for the old Miramar Hotel.”

=== Old Miramar Hotel ===
The 15-story old Miramar Hotel opened in 1978 and was officially closed in July 2000. Huang Chun-fa, a then 21-year-old, worked on the original construction site as a supervisor under the guidance of his father and uncle. He later became responsible for running the hotel. The Huangs “established a precedent for cooperation with travel agencies” bringing the ‘all-inclusive’ travel model to Taiwan. With "a reputation of solely catering to tour groups", the old Miramar, at its peak, was highly profitable, and functioned as a ‘cash cow’ for other expansion enterprises, including the Linkou golf course in New Taipei City.

=== 921 Earthquake ===
Described as a cornerstone business in “the foundation of the Huang Brothers' development”, a Business Today article noted that, “As a result of the 921 earthquake, business almost hit rock bottom.”

=== Rebuilding on old Miramar Site ===
Apart from the economic difficulties following the impact of 921, Business Today reported that in 2000, Huang Chun-fa's “(Durban) department store has accumulated losses for five years; last year NT$400 million ... and Daily Air has lost NT$500 million."

Durban Development successfully applied to rebuild a 12-story office block called Miramar Securities Financial Building (美麗華證券金融大樓). Before opening, Miramar Securities was on-sold to Gwo Hua Life Insurance (國華人壽), which was also facing financial difficulties. Huang then bought a controlling interest in Gwo Hua whereupon it was declared bankrupt.{ The Department of Finance authorized a rescue package of NT$83.868 billion (US$2.725 billion) to cover Gwo Hua's liabilities and merge with Trans Global Insurance (全球人壽)

In 2002, Huang Chun-fa and Wong Yi-ming, were charged with ‘Breach of Trust’ over the deal. Wong died during the proceedings, while Huang was acquitted.

In 2004, Huang's enterprises experienced a boost when they swept a trifecta of government BOT tenders for hotel constructions in Taipei, Hsinchu, and Taitung.

== Initial protest ==
Unlike the Miramar Taipei Gardens and Miramar Hsinchu, which were city blocks, Taitung Miramar Resort was built on a popular public/indigenous territory beach called Shanyuan/Fudafudak at a time of raised awareness in Taiwan regarding natural heritage and indigenous rights, and coinciding with the advent of social media.

Two of the first to draw attention to the development were Hsu Lan-hsiang (徐蘭香) and Lin Yunko (林雲閣). Lin is an investigative journalist who'd reported on the 1997 hillside collapse of the Lincoln Mansions (林肯大郡) (an apartment block) in Sijhih (汐止) that killed 28 residents. Subsequently, he developed an interest in inappropriate slope-land construction. According to a News Lens article, Hsu went to Taitung as a peaceful place to write, staying at a residence near Shanyuan/Fudafudak:

“Lin Yunko noticed unusual going-ons at the peaceful bay in front of him. A large security fence was erected, and workers began entering and exiting, seemingly planning to build something large.”

Lin Yunko then met one of his neighbors in the region, Hsu Lan-hsian, who also had concerns about the development. Hsu, who had “settled in the northern Tulan village near Shanyuan Bay, looking for a pure source of water for her craft-brewed vinegar”, had been involved in environmental protests from her home county of Hsinchu, and was a member of the Taitung chapter of the Taiwan Environmental Protection Union (TEPU). After discussing the issue with Lin, Hsu raised the topic at a TEPU meeting. In April 2007, the TEPU hired Lin Yun-ge as a full-time secretary to investigate the construction, report potential building violations to relevant government bodies, and write articles.

=== TEPU (臺灣環境保護聯盟) ===
The Taitung chapter of the Taiwan Environmental Protection Union (TEPU) was headed by Professor of Natural Sciences, Liu Jhong-si (劉炯錫) Professor of Geography Liao Chiu-er 廖秋娥, and Yang Tsung-wei (楊宗緯), an ex-railway engineer and Taitung museum curator. The group originally formed to protest the joint government/private BOO Taitung Incinerator.

After listening to Hsu's and Lin's concerns regarding Miramar, TEPU hired Lin as a secretary to investigate the construction and file reports with the relevant authorities. At the same time, the TEPU connected with members of the surrounding indigenous buluos, including traditional custodians, Lin Shu-ling and her mother, (Da) Panay (Lin Jing-ti 林金蒂), and Amis boat builder, Long-ge (賴進龍), as well as members of the Fugang, Fushan, and A'tolan buluos.

Apart from organizing the earliest on-site protest gatherings, TEPU began laying a paper trail of permit violations, filing reports with the Tourism Bureau, the Urban and Rural Development Office, as well as the Central Government's Administrative Yuan's Environmental Protection Association (EPA) and the Control Yuan (Ombudsman), and having the Miramar situation raised in the Legislature (by Legislator Lin Shu-fen) in April 2007. They also participated in the Citizen Litigation suits.

=== Land division irregularities ===
One of the violations uncovered in TEPU's research related to a land merging-division application for the site. On February 21, 2005, Miramar representatives and officials from the Taitung County Government Tourism Bureau (renamed Urban and Rural Development Office) agreed to merge land sections 348 and 346-2 then re-divide them to create a new section, 346–4, with an area of 0.9997 hectares, which would serve as the construction base of the hotel.

In December 2006, with the basic structure of the 5-floor building nearing completion, Miramar proposed to modify the project into three stages, taking the near-finished part as the first stage, to be followed by 2nd & 3rd construction stages. The building coverage ratio and floor to area ratio increased from 6.5% to 19.69% and 19.8% to 48.54% respectively.

As the Taipei Times reported:

"Although the entire resort — including the hotel building and other facilities — occupies an area of 59,956m2, the County Government had initially allowed the Miramar Group to divide the project site into different areas, so that no single area is more than 1 hectare because the law requires any construction project over that size to go through an EIA process."

=== 2007 Environmental Impact Assessment (EIA) ===
On January 12, 2007, an EIA panel was commissioned to retrospectively examine the project. The panel recommended a suspension of construction and fining the company for building law violations and environmental damage.

Subsequently, Miramar/Durban was fined NT$300 000 (US$9091) for “exceeding the specified scope of construction ‘Stage 1' by the Taitung Kuang Li-chen Government, though it was maintained that the already erected 5-story structure of the resort was legal.

This was done by arguing that the project should be seen as separate, evolving “stages”, with the 2nd and 3rd stages representing ‘after-thought’ improvements and/or corrections to the original plan. Even though the three stages combined amounted to 5.97 hectares, the Taitung government maintained that the ‘first stage’, if taken in isolation at the time, was only 0.99 hectares and didn't require an EIA. Therefore, “according to the law”, a building permit was issued, making it a legally pre-constructed building, or at least "definitely not substantially illegal".

=== Wild at Heart Legal Defense Association ===
Wild at Heart Taiwan is a volunteer environmental lawyer organization founded by Robin Winkler. In April 2007, Lin Yunko from the Taitung TEPU traveled to Taipei for a meeting with members of Wild at Heart as well as the national arm of TEPU looking for strategic and legal input from groups experienced in dealing with environmental issues on a national level. From that meeting, a press conference was called for April 29, where Lin Zih-lin (林子凌), Secretary General of Wild at Heart, and TEPU Secretary General Hou Jhongshun 何宗勳, outlined the history of the case including land division and waste disposal irregularities . Environmental lawyer Thomas Chan and Legislator Lin Shu-fen also attended. Following this meeting, the TEPU held activities on Shanyuan/Fudafudak beach and filed reports with the Environmental Protection Bureau (EPB), the Tourism Bureau and the Construction and Planning Agency. According to News Lens: “For the first time (the Miramar protest) began to connect with a wider network of groups and gain mainstream media interest.”

==== First Citizen Litigation ====
On July 26, 2007, Wild at Heart lawyer Chen Bo-chou (陳柏舟), working with input from Thomas Chan, assisted the TEPU (as plaintiffs) in launching the first Citizen Litigation, challenging the validity of Miramar's building permit on the grounds that it had been issued without having passed an EIA.

On August 1, another press conference was held by Lin Zih-lin and Chen Bo-chou (Wild at Heart), legislator Lai Shin-yuan, TEPU representatives, Liu Jhong-si, Lin Yunko, and Ho Tsung-shun 何宗勳, and lawyer Thomas Chan. Apart from reiterating the land division irregularities, “they used on-site photos to accuse Miramar of directly burying building waste on the beach, which was strongly denied by the industry”.

==== Construction rubble ====
In response, on August 16, 2007, representatives for Durban/Miramar and Taitung Council Speaker, Li Jin-hue (李錦慧), invited EPA officials and the media to the site for an “inspection and excavation.” Backhoes dug "ten large holes in the beach, over an approximate area of 250 square meters, but no construction waste was found.” Regarding the previously photographed rubble, a Miramar spokesperson said: “I am afraid it was planted."

The spokesperson also accused unnamed professors of “dismantling a Miramar signboard by fierce means” as well as “hindering the development of Taitung”, saying:

“Academics have a responsibility to display a sense of right and wrong; not to be engaging in small-minded acts. They should adopt a professorial style so people can respect the profession. Otherwise they will provoke disgust and be cast aside.”

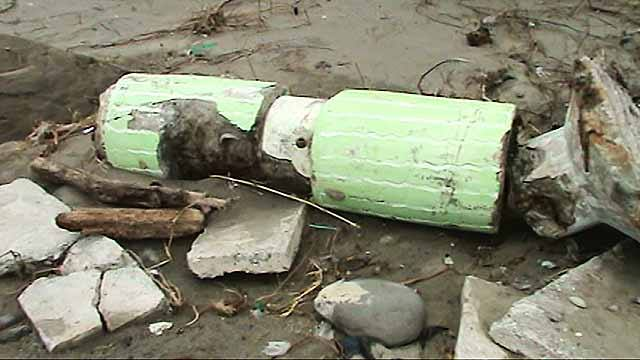
Beach erosion following Typhoon Usagi revealed remnants of the old change room facilities, 2013

Two days later, on August 18, large waves brought on by passing Typhoon Sepat revealed blocks of construction rubble on the beach at a site not excavated during the media event. On the 28th of August, the Taitung County Industrial Development & Investment Promotion Committee (TCID&IPC) staged a counter-protest at Taitung University, where TEPU conveners Liu Jhong-si and Liao Chiu-er worked. Following Typhoon Usagi in September 2013, more rubble was exposed. Miramar/Durban then agreed to remove the rubble.

== Legal proceedings ==
Although the litigation process to stop Miramar evolved into a complicated series of court cases, at its core, it was straightforward. According to the then-Environmental Impact Assessment (EIA) Act 14-1:

An EIA must be conducted on any development over one hectare - before construction begins.

Miramar was a structure exceeding one hectare - without having done an EIA.

The associated court proceedings continued for 8 years.

=== Litigation restrictions ===
The Taitung Government, apart from being a partner in the BOT Miramar project, was also the competent authority supervising the development. Critics such as Geography Professor, David Chang (張長義), from National Taiwan University have raised conflict of interest concerns when “the player acts as the referee”.

In the case of Miramar, the TEPU, in concert with Wild at Heart Lawyer, Chen Bo-chou (陳柏舟), filed reports in an attempt to initiate proceedings against Lai Ming-hsuan (賴旻炫) (Taitung Govt. head of Urban and Rural Development ) and Lo Wencheng (羅文政) (Urban and Rural Development technical specialist), then-County Magistrate, Kuang Li-chen, and Miramar/Durban owner, Huang Chun-fa, detailing involvement in the improper issuing of building permit documents, illegal waste disposal, sand theft (alleging sand was removed for use at a man-made beach near Taipei 101), and environmental destruction.

Their evidence consisted of the relevant documents and on-site photos/video of demolition rubble, cement waste-flow, and marine-ecology impact reports. All these reports against individual actors were terminated at the preliminary investigation stage by the Taitung Criminal Investigation Bureau (CIB) and/or Prosecutor's Office due to “insufficient evidence”.

Professor of Criminal Justice, Chin Ko-lin, in his book, Heijin (Black Gold), writing about county police in Taiwan in general, reports a “sense of powerlessness” felt by members of county CIB's:

“A senior police officer from Taichung city revealed to me how impotent the police are when it comes to dealing with incidents involving elected representatives:

“In fact, we can only investigate ordinary people. If the suspects are heidao elected deputies, then it's up to the people at the upper echelons to tell us what to do. Once an incident involves a political figure, that incident becomes something that we at the police station can't do much about.””

=== Environmental Impact Assessments (EIA) ===
Much of the ensuing legal proceedings revolved around the Environmental Impact Assessment (EIA) process. In January 2007, an EIA panel was belatedly convened to examine the development. Miramar failed to pass and the panel called for a halt to construction and for the company to be fined. Another three assessment meetings were held during 2007, but they also resulted in a failure to pass the project.

On January 23, 2008, protest groups achieved their first legal victory when the Kaohsiung Administrative High Court ruled:

“As an EIA wasn't conducted prior to construction, therefore, according to the EIA Act Article.14.4, the building permit issued by the defendant (Taitung County Government) is invalid.”

The Taitung Government was thus ordered to halt construction and pay all associated legal fees.

Whereas protesters argued that this meant Miramar would need to be demolished before any reapplication for an EIA could be considered, Taitung Government and Miramar representatives categorized the decision as merely reflecting “missteps ... during the construction process”, which could be remedied by retrospectively conducting an EIA.

== The 2008 EIA ==
Despite setbacks with previous EIA's, opportunities arose to rotate the panel. Taipei Times reported Professor Chang (張長義), a member of the original 2007 EIA, as saying, “Most members who had expressed concern or rejected the project have been removed ...by the local government.” According to a News Lens report: "EIA members were replaced by county officials and engineering academics, while those from the fields of ecology, geography, and social science were not chosen."

The newly appointed EIA panelists included: County Magistrate Kuang Li-chen, Deputy-Magistrate, Pong De-chen (convener and panel member), Chief of Taitung Environmental Protection Bureau (EPB), Huang Ming-en, Chief of Agriculture, Liao Fu-shan, and Chief of Urban and Rural Development Bureau, Hsu Shi-yuan. On June 15, 2008, this panel voted to approve Miramar's EIA, allowing construction to continue. The Taitung Government argued that this EIA approval rendered the High Court ruling redundant, and construction resumed.

Following this development, a Citizen Litigation petition was lodged on behalf of the TEPU by Wild at Heart lawyer Chen Bo-chou, alleging the EIA was invalid due to excessive representation by Taitung Government officials. This petition was rejected by the Taitung Environmental Protection Bureau (EPB).

=== The Charges against the Taitung Government ===
The primary suit against the Taitung County Government challenged the legality of the EIA. Chan introduced arguments related to indigenous rights, environmental damage, and dereliction of duty by the "competent authority", noting that: "According to the provisions of the first paragraph of Article 5: "The person in charge of the department shall be sentenced to a fixed-term imprisonment of not more than three years”".

However, the point that gained the most legal traction was that in joint government/private BOT or BOO projects, “members of the target business shall abstain from voting" due to conflict of interest concerns. According to Chan's prosecution:

“A total of 9 members attended the 5th Review Meeting of the EIA Committee. Among them, four were government officials. They should have abstained from voting in accordance with the above provisions, but didn't. Once these ineligible members are deducted, then only 5 members were present, less than the quorum of 8 (at least half of all members). According to Article 7(1) of the Organizational Procedures, without a quorum, the EIA resolution is invalid.”

"After fierce arguments between the two sides", on August 10, 2009, (the Administrative High) court decided to adopt the author's opinion" and declared the EIA invalid.

A secondary suit followed on from this finding: as a building permit cannot be issued without first obtaining an EIA, and the EIA had been declared invalid, therefore the building permit was likewise invalidated.

=== Government/Miramar response to 2008 EIA court verdicts ===
With the Miramar case categorized as “a precedent-setting one for the overall development of Taiwan's east coast (Lin 2012)” the Taitung Government, backed by their own team of lawyers, were determined to fight on. As Justin Huang argued:

“Even though the result of the EIA was invalidated by the administrative court (later the Supreme Court), it doesn't affect the validity of the building permit which had already been issued.”

In September 2009, the Taitung Government, under outgoing Magistrate Kuang Li-chen, appealed the decision to the Supreme Court. On Oct 9, however, Kuang “raised political eyebrows when she announced ... she was giving up her reelection bid” (for the upcoming November poll) to make way for Justin Huang. In a direct swap, Kuang Li-chen was then endorsed as the KMT candidate for the by-election to fill Huang's vacated Taitung Legislative seat.

On September 15, 2010, the Administrative High Court again ruled against the Taitung Government regarding the revocation of the 2008 EIA and ordered a halt to construction. However, on September 21, the Huang Government announced it had dispensed with the ‘three-stage’ arrangement, and re-issued a single permit for the main building and the expansions, and increasing the overall development area to “a six-hectare construction license for the entire district”. With the then court rulings relating to the old permit, it argued the new permit rendered the results of previous cases irrelevant.

=== Fan Fan Fan (反反反) ===
Fan Fan Fan (Ban Ban Ban), which formed in early 2011, was an anti-Miramar activist group composed mostly of local artists. They staged exhibitions, rallies, and concerts.

As part of efforts by TEPU, the Taitung Environmental Information Association (TEIA), the Taitung Anti-Nuclear Alliance, and Lin Shu-ling to raise awareness of the case, a public meeting was held at the old Tulan Sugar Factory, which had become a base for local artists. Lin Shu-ling recalled: "A lot of artists were uncomfortable with the Miramar development, but they hadn't gotten together." From this meeting, described as “a significant turning point”, indigenous folk singers such as Panai, Nabu, and Takanow became involved, as well as artists Rao Ai-ching, Yi-ming, Hsiau-hwa, Eleng, Dou-dou, Hana, Jen-wei, A-pei, Yu-wen and several others. As a result, the group Fan Fan Fan was formed with Takanow acting as chairperson. Their contacts (particularly Panai's) in the music and arts communities across Taiwan would contribute to “heavyweights from all walks of life showing solidarity with the anti-Miramar movement.”

Lawyer Hsu Chia-jung (許嘉蓉), also from Primordial Law, worked with Thomas Chan on the Miramar case. She observed that legal proceedings necessarily focus on complex points of law, meaning indigenous, environmental, and economic topics were unable to be discussed freely in court, so groups like FFF added another dimension. “One is passion, the other is rationality; the Miramar case was built on cooperation between the two.”

=== 2011 Camp-in and concert on Shanyuan/Fudafudak ===
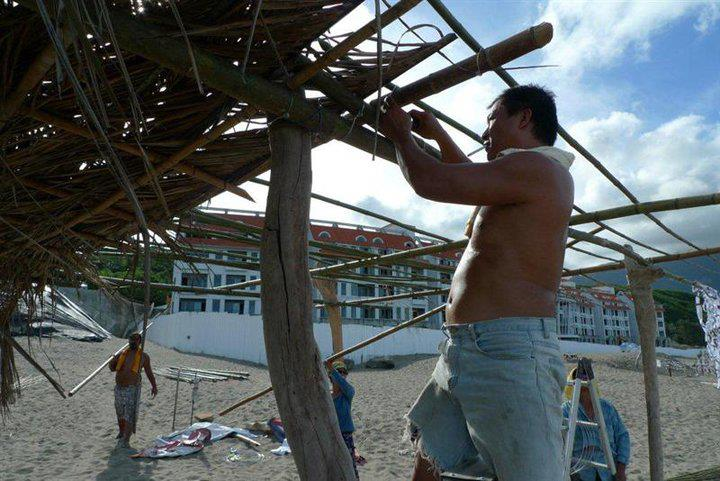
Driftwood artist Yi-ming working on 'taluan' at Miramar camp-in protest, 2011

In June 2011, FFF members began a month-long camp-in on Shanyuan/Fudafudak beach. Local indigenous driftwood artists, including Yi-ming, Eleng, and Dou Dou, oversaw the building of a taluan (traditional shelter made from driftwood, bamboo, and palm fronds), which served as a base camp, exhibition space, and counterpoint structure.

The camp-in, which emphasized the indigenous land rights aspect of the case, culminated in a rally led by Nabu (Bunun tribe) supported by “about 20 civic groups”, as well as a concert on July 9, featuring indigenous musicians including Matzka (樂團), Lung-ko (龍哥), Takanow (達卡鬧), Siki and Shan Shan, and Panai (巴奈), as well as Taiwan indie acts The Chairman (董事長樂團) and Kao Chou-chin (拷秋勤). An estimated 1000 people attended, elevating the protest to the level of a national movement.

=== Miramar opening ===
Upon the issuing of the revised building permit, work resumed. “With construction almost complete”, consortium representatives began projecting an opening date.

=== Supreme Court Verdict 2008 EIA ===
On January 19, 2012, the Supreme Court upheld previous rulings, reaffirming that there were only 5 eligible members in attendance, which was less than the quorum of 8, in which case the resolution was invalid.

On Jan 20, 2012 TEPU held a press conference on the beach in front of Miramar calling for “the building to be demolished and the environmental damage to be repaired”.

On Feb 23, a subsequent Administrative High Court order was issued for construction to be stopped. By that time, the resort was virtually complete.

Huang argued, "Today, the situation is that the main structure has been completed long ago. It's very easy to just oppose it, but what should the government do? We must solve the issue according to law. Especially considering the NT$2 billion incinerator crisis compensation payout isn't that far behind us."

== The 2012 EIA ==
In his autobiography, Justin Huang discusses his decision to conduct a new EIA:

“In April 2012, Miramar Resort applied to continue with another EIA as some people had the opinion that the number of panel members from the government (on the previous EIA) was too many. Also, they thought that since the Tourism Bureau convened the panel then the Director of Tourism shouldn't be on the panel.”

After the first meeting of the new committee in June 2012, Huang wrote, “The County Government was happy to see that the EIA panel was functioning independently - everything would be left to the experts to decide” The convener and panel chairperson was then Deputy Magistrate, Chang Ji-i, an architect and Harvard graduate in landscape design, as well as a member of Huang's “leadership force” triumvirate. Three county Department Directors were also appointed, including: Huang Ming-an (黃明恩), Director of Environmental Protection Bureau; Hsu Jui-kwei (許瑞貴), Director of Construction Department; and Liu Jung-tang (劉榮堂), Director of Agriculture.

=== Protest concert 2012 ===
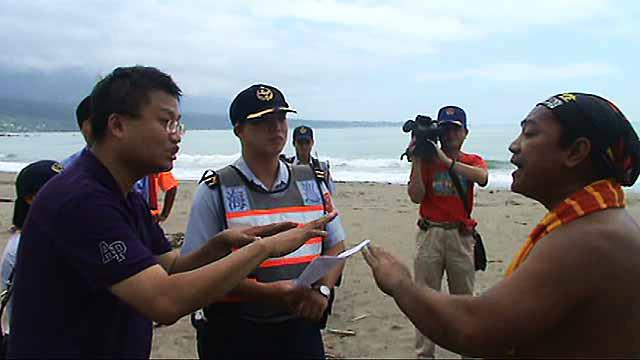
Miramar manager and Nabu argue over building of taluan on Shanyuan/Fudafudak, 2012

In response, Fan Fan Fan in alliance with Citizens of the Earth Taiwan and the network of environmental/aboriginal civil groups, re-built the 'taluan' from the previous year and occupied Fudafudak, resulting in confrontation with Miramar management. On July 18, a press conference including The Chairman vocalist A-chi (阿吉), FIR vocalist Faye (飛), singer/songwriter Deserts Chang (張懸), music critic Chang Tieh-chih (張鐵志), and Panai and Nabu was held to promote the event. Deserts Chang said, “The government should use its policies to preserve these places, instead of avoiding obligations and finding regulation loopholes”, while Chang Tieh-chih asked, “Should we allow the first domino to fall, leading to a gray [covered with concrete] coastline in eastern Taiwan?”

On July 28, with a typhoon looming, an exhibition, rally, and concert was held on Fudafudak. The event was attended by around 1000 people and featured performances by Ilid Kaolo (以莉．高露), Ciacia (何欣穗), Panai (巴奈), The Chairman, Kimbo Hu (胡德夫), Takanow (達卡鬧), Long Ge (龍哥), Relax One (輕鬆玩), and Kao Chou Ching (拷秋勤). Thomas Chan (詹順貴) also addressed the crowd.

36 hours later, Typhoon Saola made landfall, sweeping away the taluan and causing damage to Miramar.

=== Academics’ petition ===
The first meeting of the new EIA panel (6th overall), was held in June, but as it failed to reach a resolution, the panel adjourned until November 29. Prior to the November meeting, the Taipei Times reported: “More than 600 academics have signed a petition (initiated by National Dong Hwa University) demanding all construction on Miramar Resort Village be halted in line with a court ruling ...(and) urged the government to tear down the Miramar Resort Village project and called on their peers to refuse to join an environmental impact assessment (EIA) meeting on the controversial project next week.”

Consequently, the meeting was canceled due to a failure to achieve a quorum of 8.

=== The day of the 2012 EIA ===
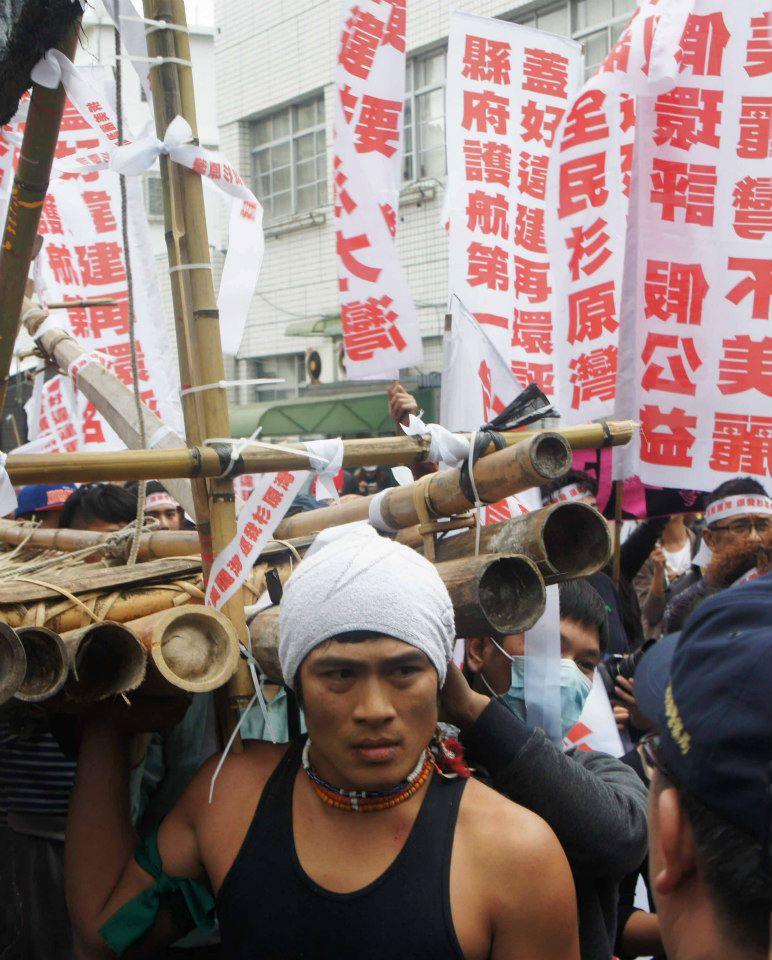
Lafin carrying Amis raft at 2012 Miramar EIA protest

On December 22, protesters and resort supporters gathered. According to Sam Wilde for the Taipei Times:

“The atmosphere outside Taitung's imposing County Hall was tense. Over 100 police officers wielding meter-long batons and riot-control shields stood facing a crowd of anti-hotel protesters”

A symbol of the FFF group was an ocean-going raft built by local Amis resident, Long Ge (Lai Ching-lung 賴進龍). Video shows protesters carrying it on their shoulders and making thrusts towards police lines as the crowd chants “Illegal EIA!” (環評違法) and “Demolish! Demolish! Demolish!” (拆 拆 拆)

The pro-Miramar contingent was allotted the steps area of County Hall. They included representatives from the local Tse-tung buluo who performed traditional songs, as well as members of Taitung County Industrial Development & Investment Promotion Committee (TCID&IPC). They chanted: “Fake Taitung Residents Get Out of Taitung!”

With police focus on the boat-surge, a group of activists gained access to County Hall through a back window. Inside, they chanted “Illegal EIA!”, before being forcibly removed by police. Deputy Magistrate and chairperson, Chang Ji-yi, withdrew the panel to a closed hearing before emerging to announce the decision. Focus Taiwan reported:

“Of the eight members of the committee, seven approved the environmental assessment (unconditionally), and one approved it conditionally.”

=== Second projected opening ===
In the following months, “The county government gave the green light for the company to resume construction”, and Miramar held a 'soft opening' activity at the resort, saying it would "commence trial operations in May".

==== Legal reaction ====
The Taipei Times reported: "Local residents filed two (Citizen Litigation) lawsuits with the Kaohsiung Administrative Court: one alleging that the 2012 EIA review was illegal and the other demanding that the approval to resume construction of the hotel be revoked.”

Lawyer Thomas Chan argued that, “The (resolution) was illegal because the case was not reviewed at the central government level, as it should have been according to administrative procedures (EIA's for international tourism developments must be conducted by the central government, not local governments), the review committee members (three of whom were government department heads) did not avoid conflicts of interest, and the case was evaluated on a continuing basis (according to the modified permits instead of the original plans).”

=== Walk to Taipei ===
On April 4, 2013, the groups Fan Fan Fan (FFF) and Citizens of the Earth Taiwan with support from Wild at Heart and TEPU, began a walk from Fudafuduk/Shanyuan, the site of Miramar, up the east coast to Taipei. Local resident and Amis elder, Long Ge (賴進龍), acted as "spiritual leader", while Taitung broken-tile artist, Rao Ai-ching, was chairperson for the group. Indigenous activists and FFF members, Lin Shu-ling, Nabu and Panai also participated. The walk connected with villages in Taitung, Hualien, Ilan, and Taipei to participate in ceremonies and discuss land rights and local construction issues. They also visited the Lungmen Nuclear Power Plant on the north east coast near Fulung beach, where they were met by rows of armed police. With a referendum on the facility being debated at the time, protesters claimed the plant was an inappropriate development on an indigenous artifact site, and prone to earthquakes or missiles from China. (It has since been mothballed.) Upon arriving in Taipei, a march and rally with “an alliance of more than 40 civic groups and Aboriginal tribes” was held at Huang Chun-fa's Miramar Garden Taipei hotel, before continuing to the Presidential Palace (Presidential Office Building) for speeches and a concert featuring popular indigenous and indie acts, which was attended by approximately 2000 people.

=== Court verdicts regarding 2012 EIA ===
What followed was another round of courtroom defeats for the Taitung government. In July 2013, the Administrative High Court ordered a halt to construction pending the outcome of the case challenging the 2012 EIA, which was announced on October 28 when the Administrative High Court ruled it invalid. Using the same maths as with the 2008 EIA, the judges found that when the three government department heads were subtracted from the vote, there were only five eligible members, which was under the required quorum of 8. Waiting until the final day of allowable time, the Taitung Government filed an appeal to the Supreme Court, with Chen Chin-hu saying, “We didn't enclose any legal arguments for the appeal in our submission. We will decide later whether to offer reasons or not - it depends on the attitude of Miramar executives towards this case.”

Lin Shu-ling (林淑玲), one of 14 plaintiffs on the citizen suit, described the decision to appeal as “a waste of public money”. She stated, “The county government has approved two EIA reports by the company; both were revoked by judges. It should get the judges’ messages through its head.”

Thomas Chan also argued that the central government had let the BOT project run out of control. “It's embarrassing that the central administrative organs have first set fires (by allowing the Taitung government to act as competent authority), and this makes it impossible to correct the fire lighting behavior of the local government, who follow their example.”

More than two years later, on March 31, 2016, the Administrative Supreme Court dismissed the Taitung government's final appeal and barred Miramar from opening. The decision could not be appealed. By that time, the Taitung Government had lost 10 straight cases.

No court proceedings have been held to decide whether Miramar should be demolished.

== Miramar's compensation claim ==
One of the main arguments for allowing the resort to open was the threat of Miramar suing if it was blocked. In 2011 Magistrate Huang said: "We'd not only lose our investment, we'd definitely be sued by Miramar in court.” Thomas Chan, dismissed this as a "scare tactic”, noting that “The developers ...violated the law by beginning construction before applying for EIA approval, thereby voiding any compensation claim”.

In late 2014, following Miramar/Taitung government's eighth court loss, Huang shifted focus to an internal resolution:

“The just outcome of this EIA resolution was denied by the verdicts of the courts. As a result, we have no idea what to do. Ensuring the rights of the Taitung people is the first thing to consider, but given the company has spent more than NT$1 billion on the project, it is impossible to just accept this loss and walk away, leaving the resort to stand idle on the beach forever. As such, the Taitung Government is psychologically prepared to face the consequences of a compensation request for terminating the contract, just like the Taitung Incinerator.” (In 2011, the Build Operate Own (BOO) builders of the “mothballed” Taitung Incinerator were controversially granted a compensation payout of NT$1.96 billion as a result of a dispute resolution tribunal convened by Huang government Secretary General, Chen Chin-hu (陳金虎)).

=== Dispute resolution tribunal ===
An arbitration tribunal is composed of the two disputant parties and a mediator. In the Miramar case, however, Miramar and the Taitung government were already in broad agreement on an amount, with both sides having floated a figure “in excess of 1 billion” prior to the meeting.

According to Arbitration law, Article 23: "The Arbitration process is a closed hearing. The (mediator) should afford both parties sufficient opportunities to make their statement, and investigate when necessary according to what they propose. The negotiation process will remain confidential unless both parties agree to disclose details."

== Current status ==
Although the company has abandoned hopes of opening the resort, no process has been established to demolish Miramar or to seek compensation from the company for environmental restoration.

Magistrate Huang, who said, “even if compensation is paid in the future, it will still not be demolished”, has proposed that it be converted into an “office block” or “international conference hall”.

No criminal investigation has been conducted in relation to the building of Miramar.

On Oct 23, 2020, the arbitration tribunal convened to examine the compensation claim by Miramar Resort ordered the Taitung County Government to pay NT$629 million (US$21.75 million) to the company. According to the terms of the agreement, the Taitung County Government would then assume ownership of the resort's buildings and facilities.

The fate of the buildings remained unresolved. The Hualien-Taitung branch of Citizens of the Earth, requested that the closed proceedings of the arbitration tribunal be made public and called for the hotel to be demolished, while the Taipei Times reported that, "County government officials are ... leaning toward preserving the resort's buildings and facilities, and turning them into a public leisure park and a venue for international meetings."
