= Lin Shu-ling =

Taiwanese activist (born 1976)

Lin Shu-ling (Chinese: 林淑玲; pinyin: Lín Shūlíng; born 1976), is an Amis woman from the Tse-tung buluo (indigenous village community), in the Fushan Village, Beinan Township, Taitung County, Taiwan. As a traditional custodian of the land on which the Taitung Miramar Resort was built, she was a leader of the community movement against it, and became a voice for indigenous land rights in Taiwan.

In 2018, Lin announced her intention to run as a plains aborigines candidate in the Beinan Township representing the New Power Party in the November 2018 Taitung County Government elections. However, in September 2018, she was disqualified by the Taitung Election Commission due to having a conviction for "public abuse". She has appealed her disqualification to the Central Election Commission.

== Taitung Miramar Resort protest ==
After receiving an eviction/demolish order for her grandmother's house, Lin began protesting the Miramar Resort project on Shanyuan/Fudafudak beach.

Lin formed alliances with civc groups including Taiwan Environment Protection Union, Wild at Heart Legal Defense Association, and Citizens of the Earth, as well as surrounding Amis buluos (indigenous villages). The Miramar situation is unresolved, having evolved into "a landmark case".

=== Legal proceedings ===
In 2008, Lin became a plaintiff on a series of Citizen Litigation suits first launched by Chen Bo-chou (陳柏舟) and then Thomas Chan challenging the legality of the resort's EIA and building permit. Despite winning this, and all subsequent cases related to the Miramar project, appeals by the Kuang Li-chen and Justin Huang administrations extended the process to eight years. Construction continued while appeals were pending.

=== Community involvement ===
Described in a CNA report as "the soul of the Miramar protest movement", Lin was a founding member and spokesperson for Fan Fan Fan (FFF), a local arts community activist group, which staged rallies and concerts with performances by Taiwanese indigenous and indie acts. She also participated in a month-long camp-in on Shanyuan/Fudafuduk beach in 2011. In 2013, FFF undertook a 300 km walk from the site of the Miramar construction to the Presidential Office Building.

=== Current status ===
Although the Supreme Court rulings have prevented Miramar from opening, it stands fully built on the beach. Lin continues to campaign for the resort to be demolished. She supports calls for an investigation to determine whether Miramar/Durban Development should be held liable for restoring Shanyuan/Fudafuduk beach to its pre-Miramar state. Lin is promising greater scrutiny of the current Arbitration Tribunal process involving Magistrate Justin Huang and convener, Deputy County Magistrate Chen Chin-hu (陳金虎) (and/or their representatives), and Miramar owner, Huang Chun-fa (and/or his representatives), and a mediator. They are meeting to reach agreement on a compensation amount to be paid to Miramar Resort Ltd. Lin is campaigning for a postponement of that process pending an investigation.

== Political career ==
In August 2018, Lin announced her intention to run as an Aborigines Plains Representative in the November 2018 Taitung Government election. According to Lin's campaign website, her focus is to revitalize the culture of local communities while also working to enshrine the legal recognition of traditional lands.

Lin rejected the Taitung County Government discourse that resort developments solve problems of employment and cultural cohesion. She proposed to increase youth access to small-business courses and encourage youth feedback regarding cultural values and appropriate development. Lin has also promised to "demand transparency regarding government spending" (currently detailed budget data is not published by the Taitung Department of Finance), and “guard public money".

=== Disqualification from running for political office ===
In October 2018, six weeks before the election, Lin was banned from running for office by the Taitung Election Commission (TEC) on the grounds that she had a misdemeanor conviction for 'public abuse'.

The case against Lin was triggered by a neighbor dispute relating to a private construction that Lin believed encroached on her grandmother's land.

Lin accepted a fine of NT$3000 (US$100), saying she regarded it as a minor matter. Lin was informed of her disqualification whilst campaigning for the November 24 elections, 6 months later. According to Lin, neither the prosecutor nor her lawyer made her aware of any potential ban attached to agreeing to pay the fine.

Lin requested the TEC's decision be reviewed by the Central Election Commission. She received a reply from the TEC, signed by Deputy Magistrate Chen Chin-hu (陳金虎), who is also Director of the TEC, saying her disqualification from the Taitung County Council elections had been upheld. Lin explored other options to have the decision overturned, saying, "Until a final decision is made, I will continue campaigning," but was unable to revoke the cancellation of her candidacy.

== Work life ==
Lin runs a small business with her mother, Da Panay (Lin Chin-ti 林金蒂), raising goats and cropping hibiscus. They assist Lin's grandmother, Miarde, who grows artemisia.
