= Chulu =

Chulu may refer to:

- Chulu Ranch, a tourist attraction ranch in Beinan Township, Taitung County, Taiwan
- Chulu East and Chulu West, two of the trekking peaks in Nepal
- Stepping Out (Singaporean TV series), a 1999 TV series
