= Chulu Ranch =

Ranch in Beinan, Taitung County, Taiwan

Chulu Ranch 初鹿牧場
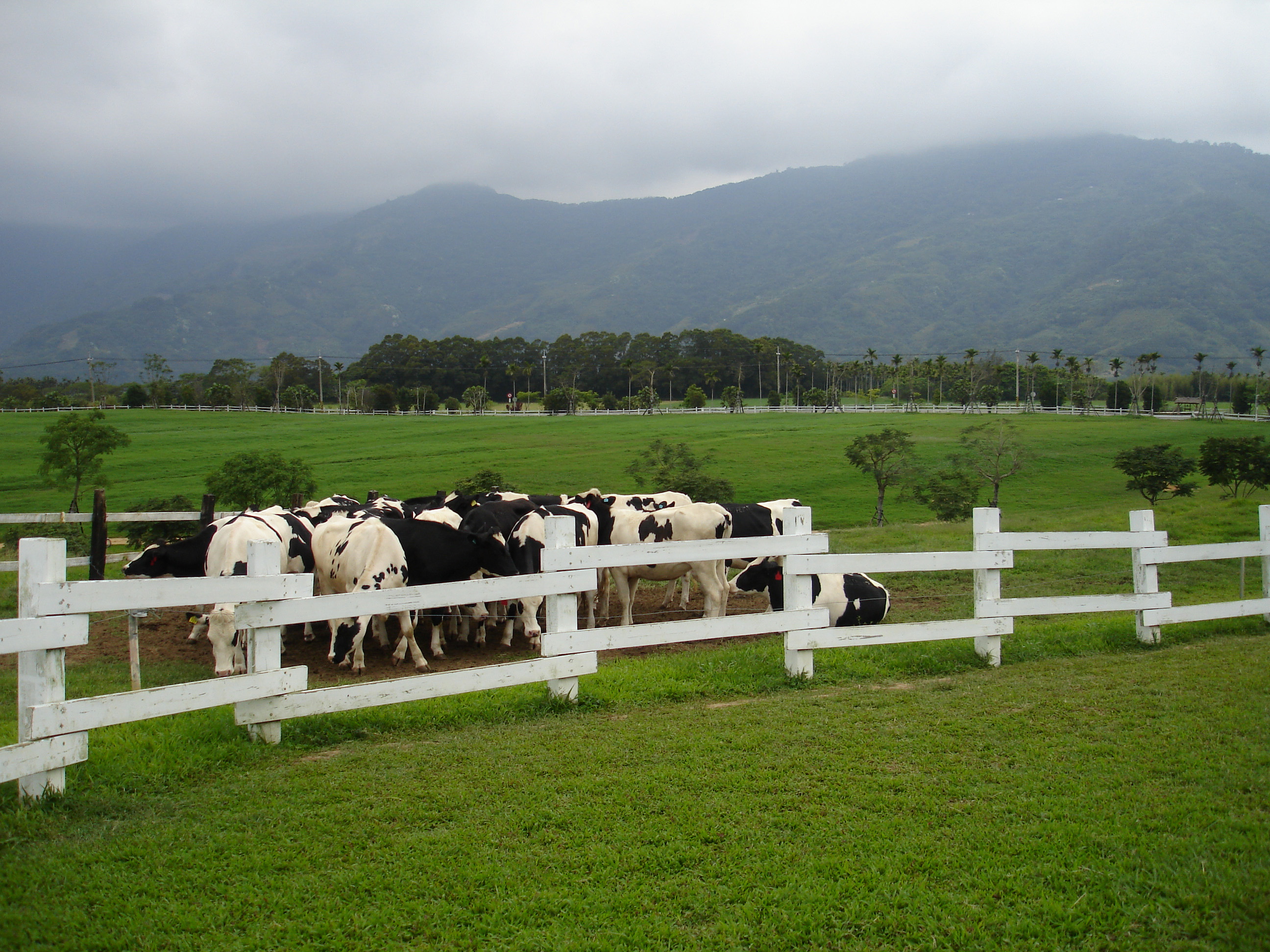
- Town/City: Beinan, Taitung County, Taiwan
- Coordinates: 22°51′57.8″N 121°06′29.8″E
- Established: 1973
- Area: 70 hectares
- Website: Official website (in Chinese)

The Chulu Ranch (traditional Chinese: 初鹿牧場; simplified Chinese: 初鹿牧场; pinyin: Chūlù Mùchǎng) is a tourist attraction ranch in Beinan Township, Taitung County, Taiwan.

== History ==
The ranch was opened in 1973.

== Geology ==
The ranch land is located 200-390 meters above sea level with an area of 70 hectares in a slopped land.

== Business ==
Annual milk production by the cows in the ranch is 500 tons. The ranch also sells dairy and skin care products. Various activities can be done at the ranch, such as horse riding.

== Transportation ==
The ranch is accessible north west from Shanli Station of the Taiwan Railway.

== See also ==
- List of tourist attractions in Taiwan
