= Huang Chun-fa =

Taiwanese businessman

- 黃春發
- Born: 1957 (age 68–69)
- Father: Huang Rong-hua

Huang Chun-fa (Chinese: 黃春發; pinyin: Huáng Chūnfā; born 1957) is a Taiwanese businessman and son of Huang Rong-hua (黃榮華), one of the founding brothers of the Miramar Group conglomerate and the Miramar Huang family (美麗華黃家).

According to a China Post report, "The Miramar Group consists of subdivisions owned by different members within the giant, extended Huang family". Within this structure, Huang Chun-fa is the owner of Durban Development Company (德安集團) (construction), Tze Hsin 志信) (transportation and gas stations), Mayer Steel Pipe Corporation ("Taiwan Mayer" 美亞鋼管), Durban Department Store (德安百貨), and the Miramar hotels (Taipei Gardens 台北美麗信花園酒店, Hsinchu Miramar 新竹美麗信花園酒店, and Taitung Miramar Resort 台東美麗灣酒店), and other businesses.

Until recently, Huang owned Daily Air Corporation, a small fleet of six planes servicing Penghu islands (off the coast of Kaohsiung), as well as Orchid and Green Islands (off the coast of Taitung), but the company's shares were gradually sold off to Huang employee, Kuo Tze-hsin (郭自行) whereupon Kuo became the sole owner.

Huang was also a previous distributor for SsangYong Motor in Taiwan.

== Daily Air Corporation subsidy fraud investigation ==
In 2018 Huang Chun-fa was investigated regarding subsidy application fraud over a 10-year period dating back to 2005 in relation to his time as chairman of Daily Air Corporation. The investigation involved "more than NT$500 million" in subsidies. According to the China Times: "Daily Air was suspected of over-reporting expenses and declaring false losses when applying to the Civil Aviation Administration for subsidies. The Civil Aviation Administration sent an auditor to the airport maintenance facility to check the application, and did not find the listed items listed in the subsidy application."

The over-reported costs allegedly included "maintenance costs, and special private expenses". After questioning, Huang Chun-fa was released on bail of NT$3 million.
