= Jhihben National Forest Recreation Area =

Forest in Beinan, Taitung County, Taiwan

Zhiben National Forest Recreation Area Chinese: 知本國家森林遊樂區
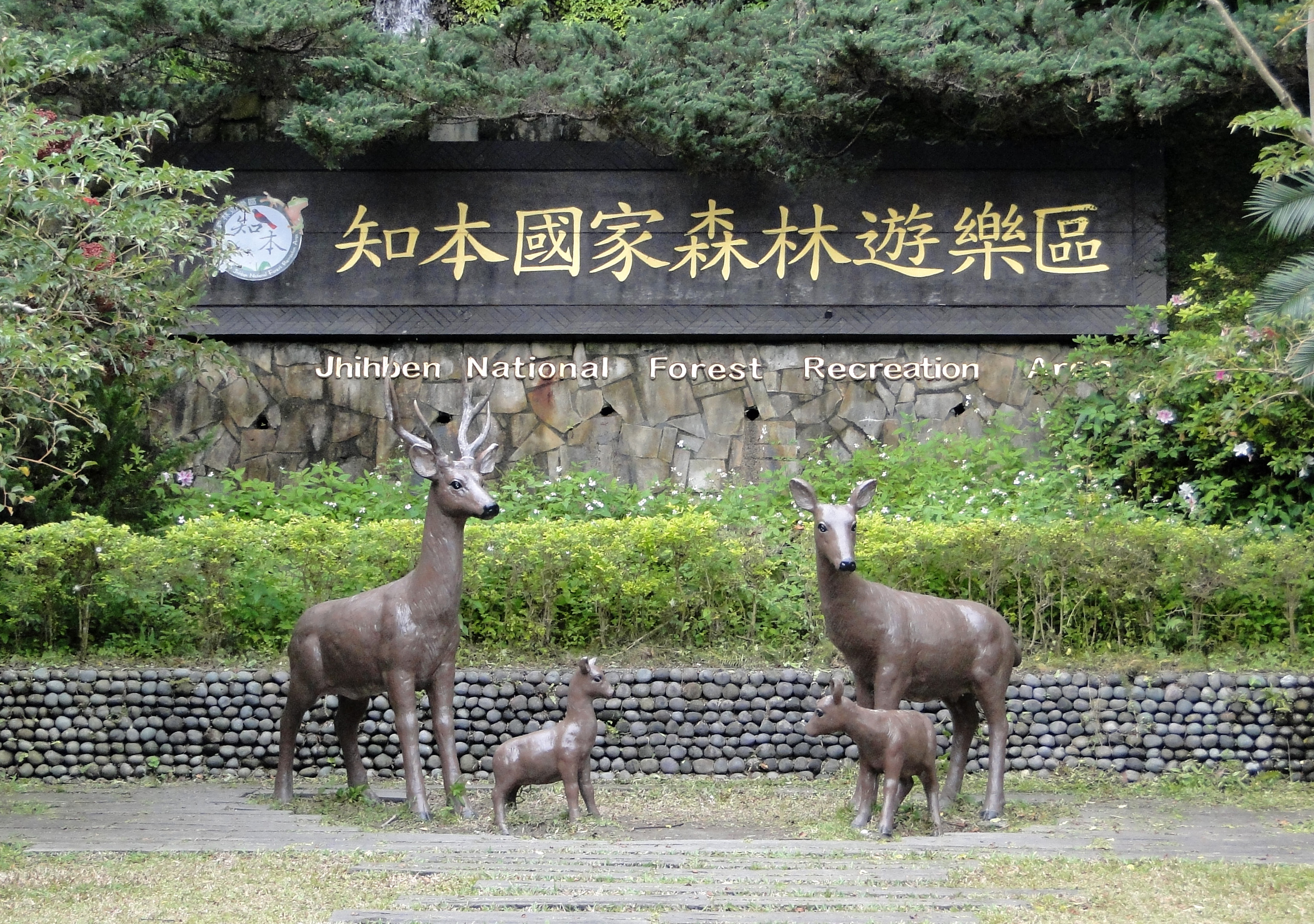

- Location within Taitung County
- Interactive map of Zhiben National Forest Recreation Area

Geography
- Location: Beinan, Taitung County, Taiwan
- Coordinates: 22°41′32.9″N 120°59′23.0″E
- Elevation: 125–650 m (410–2,133 ft)
- Area: 110 ha (270 acres)

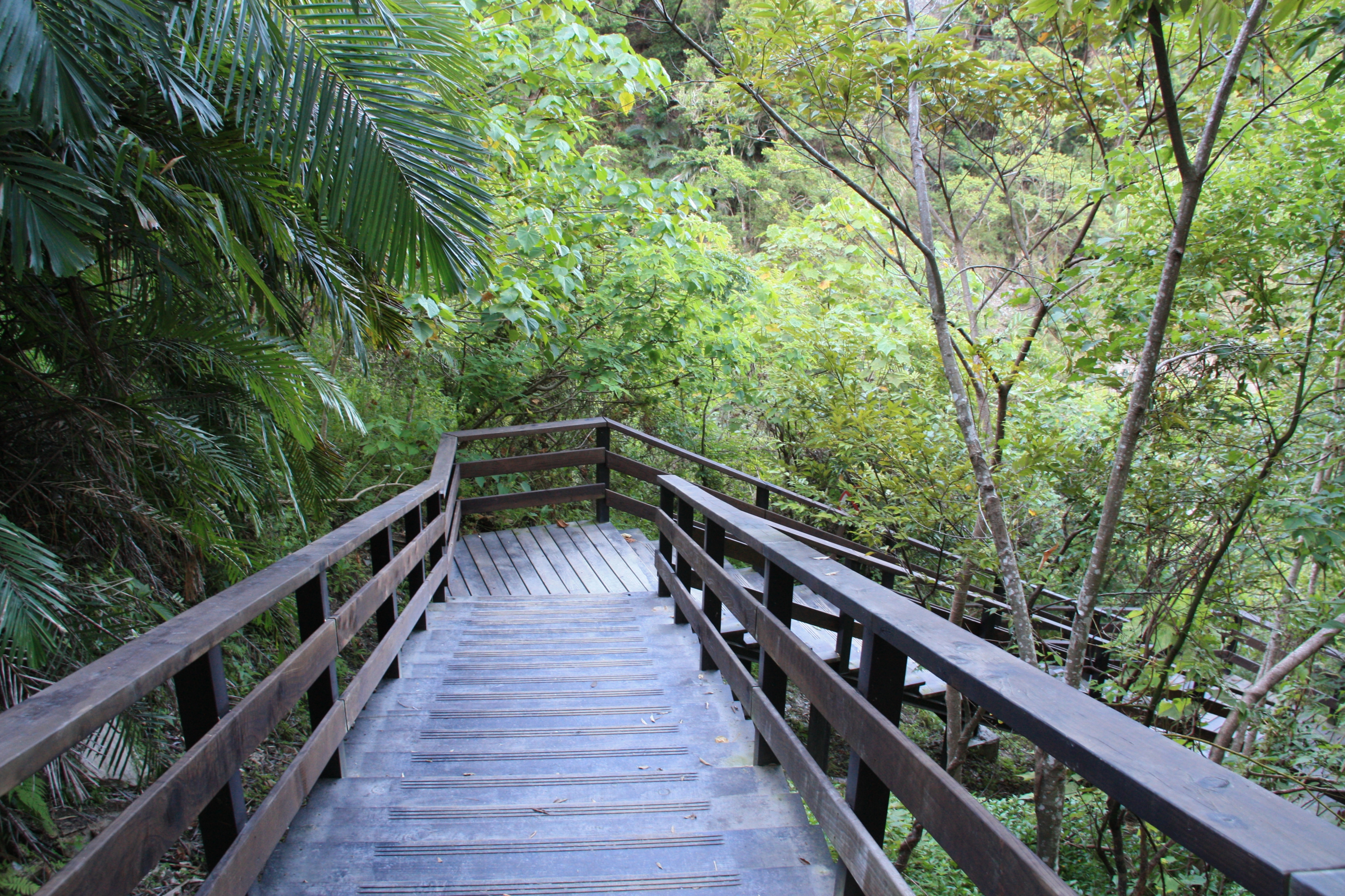

Zhiben National Forest Recreation Area (traditional Chinese: 知本國家森林遊樂區; simplified Chinese: 知本国家森林游乐区; pinyin: Zhīběn Guójiā Sēnlín Yóulè Qū) is located in Beinan Township, Taitung County, Taiwan.

== Geography ==
The forest recreation area spans around 110 hectares in area with an elevation of 125 to 650 meters above sea level. The park has an annual mean temperature of around 22 °C.

== Architecture ==
The forest features various walking trails and recreational facilities.

== Transportation ==
The recreation area is accessible by bus from Taitung City.

== See also ==
- Geography of Taiwan
