= Miramar murders =

The Miramar murders were a triple fratricide/suicide involving second generation members from the Huang Jung-tu (黃榮圖) branch of the Miramar Huang family, that occurred in November 2015 at the headquarters of Miramar Group company, Mayfull Food Corp (美福食集), in Neihu District, Taipei, Taiwan.

At a family meeting of Huang Jung-tu's (黃榮圖) descendants from his first marriage, an argument broke out regarding the distribution of their father's fortune. Younger brother, Huang Ming-te (黃明德), angered that his request for more money had been rebuffed by older brother, Huang Ming-huang (黃明煌), produced an Italian Tanfoglio pistol and shot him dead. Huang Ming-jen (黃明仁), the 3rd-eldest sibling, then attempted to intervene, whereupon Huang Ming-te shot him dead.

Another brother, Huang Ming-tang (黃明堂), fled the scene and locked himself in an adjoining suite, from where he called the police. According to a report in the Taipei Times:

“Police officers arrived to find Huang Ming-te standing on the building’s seventh floor balcony holding a handgun. Despite the officers’ attempts to talk him down, he shot himself, fell to the ground and was later pronounced dead at the Tri-Service General Hospital”

In all, 13 shots were fired.

Apart from owning Mayfull and other companies, “The Huang family, reportedly owns numerous plots of land and real estate in the Dazhi area worth more than NT$100 billion (US$3.06 billion).”
