= Thomas Chan =

Taiwanese lawyer

Thomas Shun-Kuei Chan
- 詹順貴
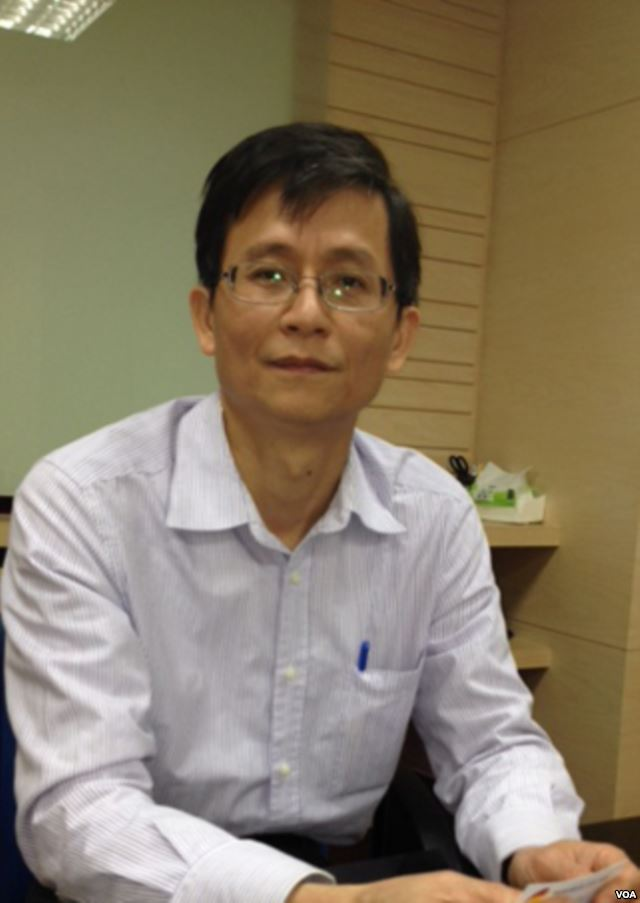

Deputy Minister of Environmental Protection Administration of the Republic of China
- In office 20 May 2016 – 8 October 2018
- Minister: Lee Ying-yuan

Personal details
- Born: 3 January 1964 (age 62)
- Party: Green Party Taiwan
- Education: National Taiwan University (LLB)

Thomas Shun-Kuei Chan (Chinese: 詹順貴; pinyin: Zhān Shùnguì; Pe̍h-ōe-jī: Chiam Sūn-kùi; born 3 January 1964) is a Taiwanese lawyer. He was deputy minister of the Environmental Protection Administration between 20 May 2016 and 8 October 2018.

== Education ==
Chan obtained his bachelor's degree in law from National Taiwan University in 1985. He then worked as an environmental lawyer.

== Taitung Miramar Resort case ==
Thomas Chan is known for his volunteer (pro bono) work on the build–operate–transfer (BOT) Taitung Miramar Resort case. On 23 December 2008, in conjunction with community plaintiffs (including indigenous land rights activist, Lin Shu-ling) and Wild at Heart Legal Defense Association, Chan challenged the validity of an environmental impact assessment (EIA) retrospectively conducted by the Taitung County Government in relation to the Taitung Miramar Resort. This case would ultimately lead to Supreme Court rulings barring Miramar from opening. Chan has called for the resort to be demolished.

== Political career ==
Chan was a member of Environmental Impact Assessment Review Committee of the EPA in 2005–2007, member of National Planning Commission and member of Regional Planning Committee of the Ministry of the Interior in 2007-2011 and 2009-2011 respectively, member of Trust Law Amendment Study Sub-committee of the Ministry of Justice in 2010-2016 and member of Legal Affairs Committee of the Council of Indigenous Peoples in 2011–2016. Chan assumed office as deputy minister of the Environmental Protection Administration in May 2016. He tendered his resignation for the first time soon after Lin Chuan left the premiership in September 2017. A year later, Chan notified the Executive Yuan that he intended to resign. His second resignation was not accepted until October 2018, when Chan posted about it on social media.
