= Beinan, Taitung =

Rural township in Taitung County, Taiwan

Coordinates: 22°47′N 121°07′E

Beinan Township 卑南鄉
- Rural township
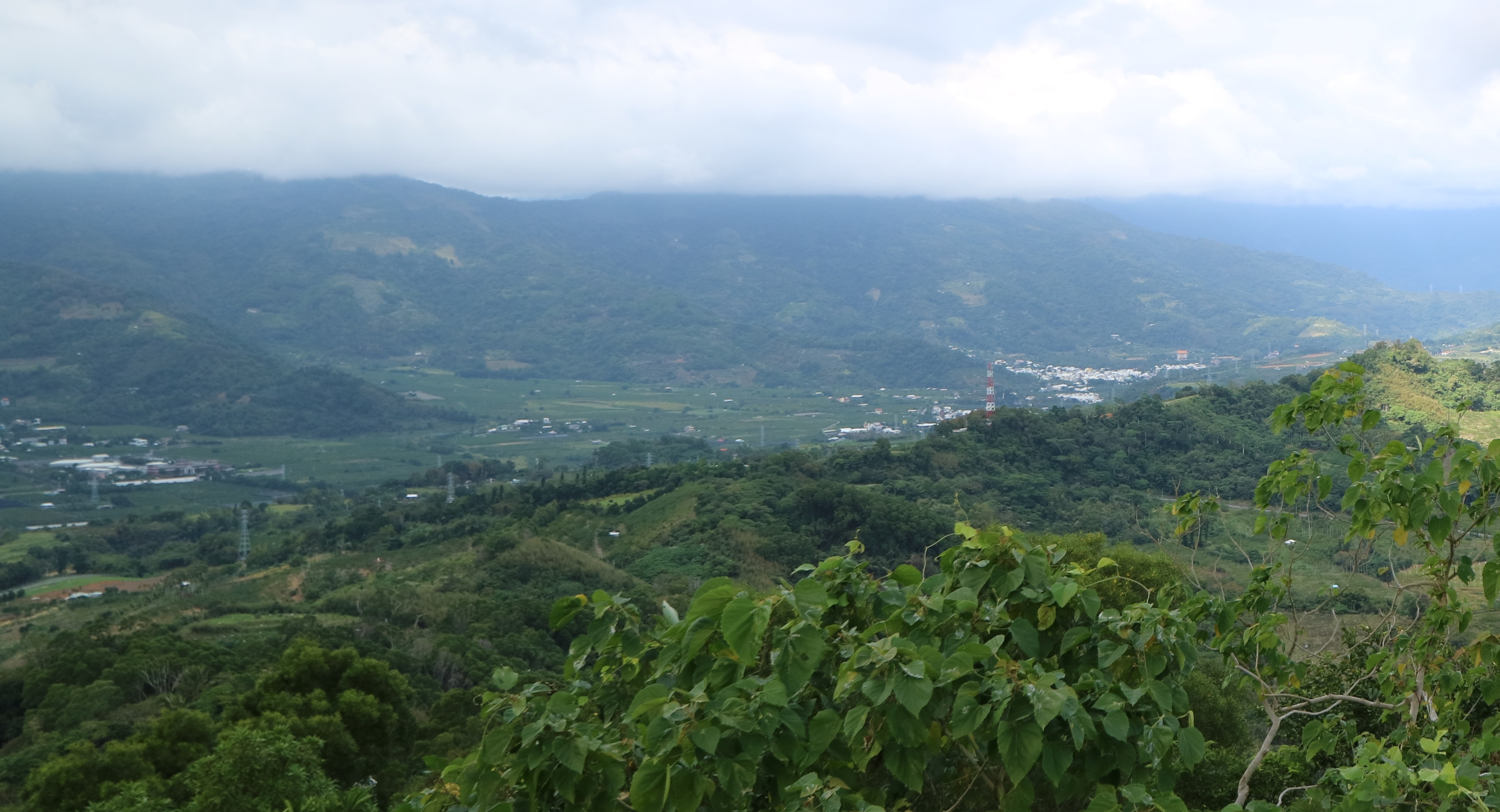

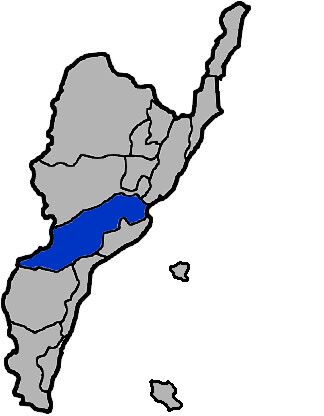
- Beinan Township in Taitung County
- Location: Taitung County, Taiwan

Area
  - Total: 413 km^{2} (159 sq mi)

Population (February 2023)
  - Total: 16,798
  - Density: 40.7/km^{2} (105/sq mi)

Beinan Township or Peinan Township (Chinese: 卑南鄕; pinyin: Bēinán Xiāng; Pe̍h-ōe-jī: Pi-lâm) is a rural township in Taitung County, Taiwan. It has a population of 16,798 as of February 2023. It is home to the Puyuma and Rukai peoples.

== Name ==
This southeastern region of Taiwan was originally dominated by the Puyuma people. The township is named in Puyuma in honor of chief Pinara.

In Dutch Formosa, the Dutch called the township Pimala. During Qing rule, access to the area was prohibited.

== History ==
In 1875, Pi-lam Subprefecture (卑南廳) was established. During the period of Japanese rule, Pinan Village (卑南庄) was established under Taitō District, Taitō Prefecture. After the handover of Taiwan from Japan to the Republic of China in 1945, Beinan was established as a rural township of Taitung County.

== Geography ==
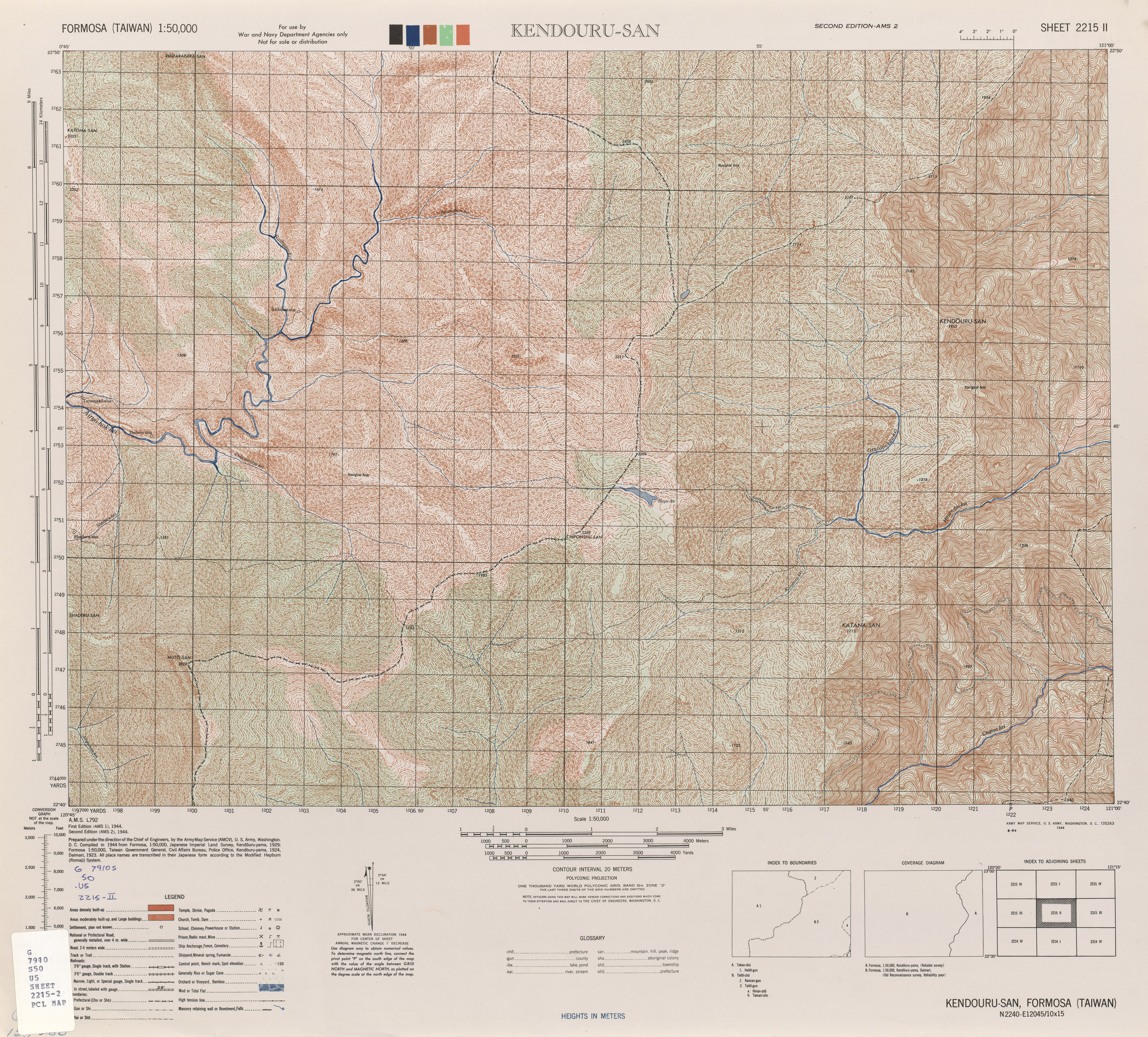
Map of Beinan area (1944)

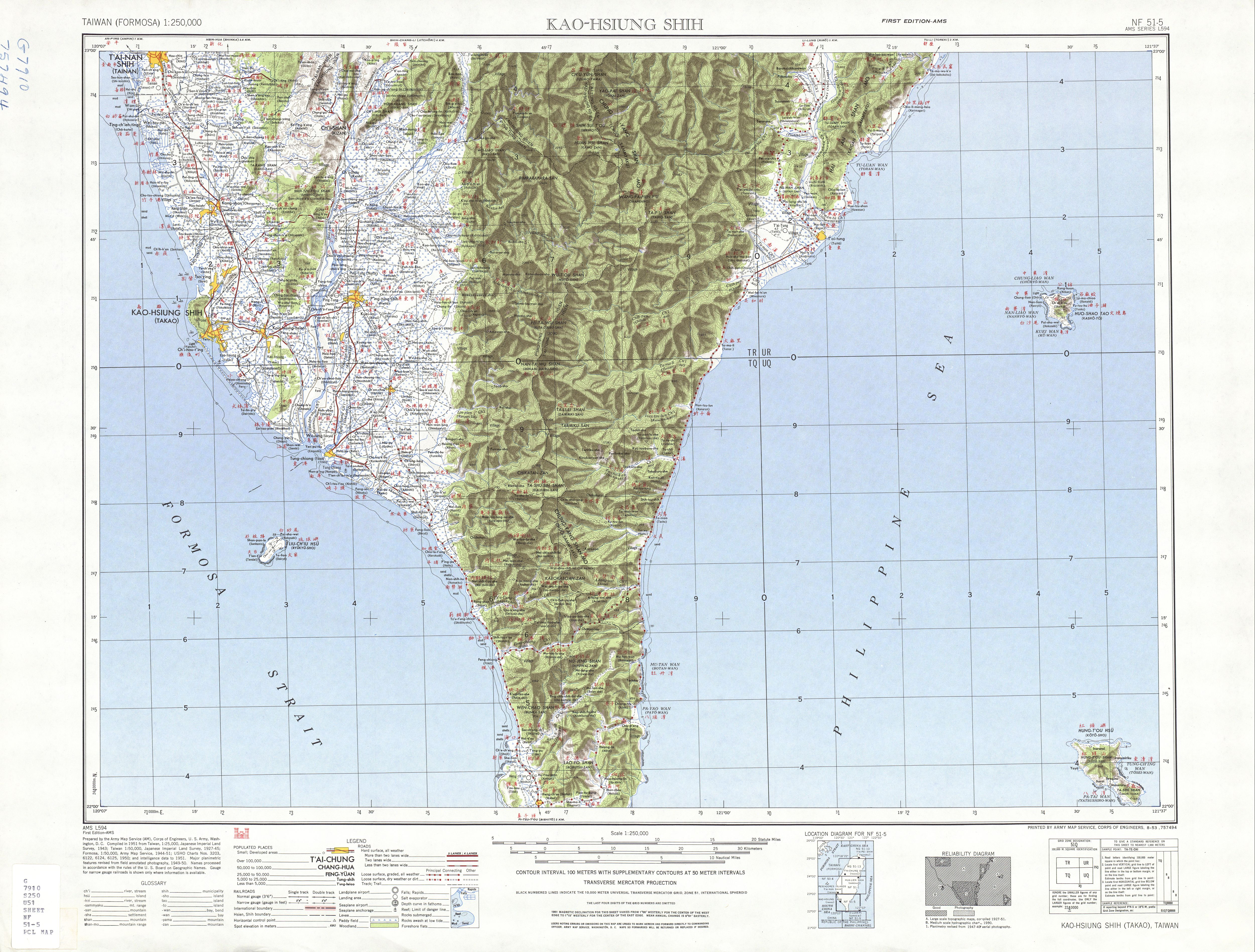
Map of the region including the Beinan area (1951)

The northeast portion of the township is part of the Huatung Valley.

== Administrative divisions ==
The township comprises 13 villages: Binlang, Chulu, Fushan, Fuyuan, Jiafong, Liji, Lijia, Meinong, Mingfong, Taian, Taiping, Tunghsing and Wenkuan.

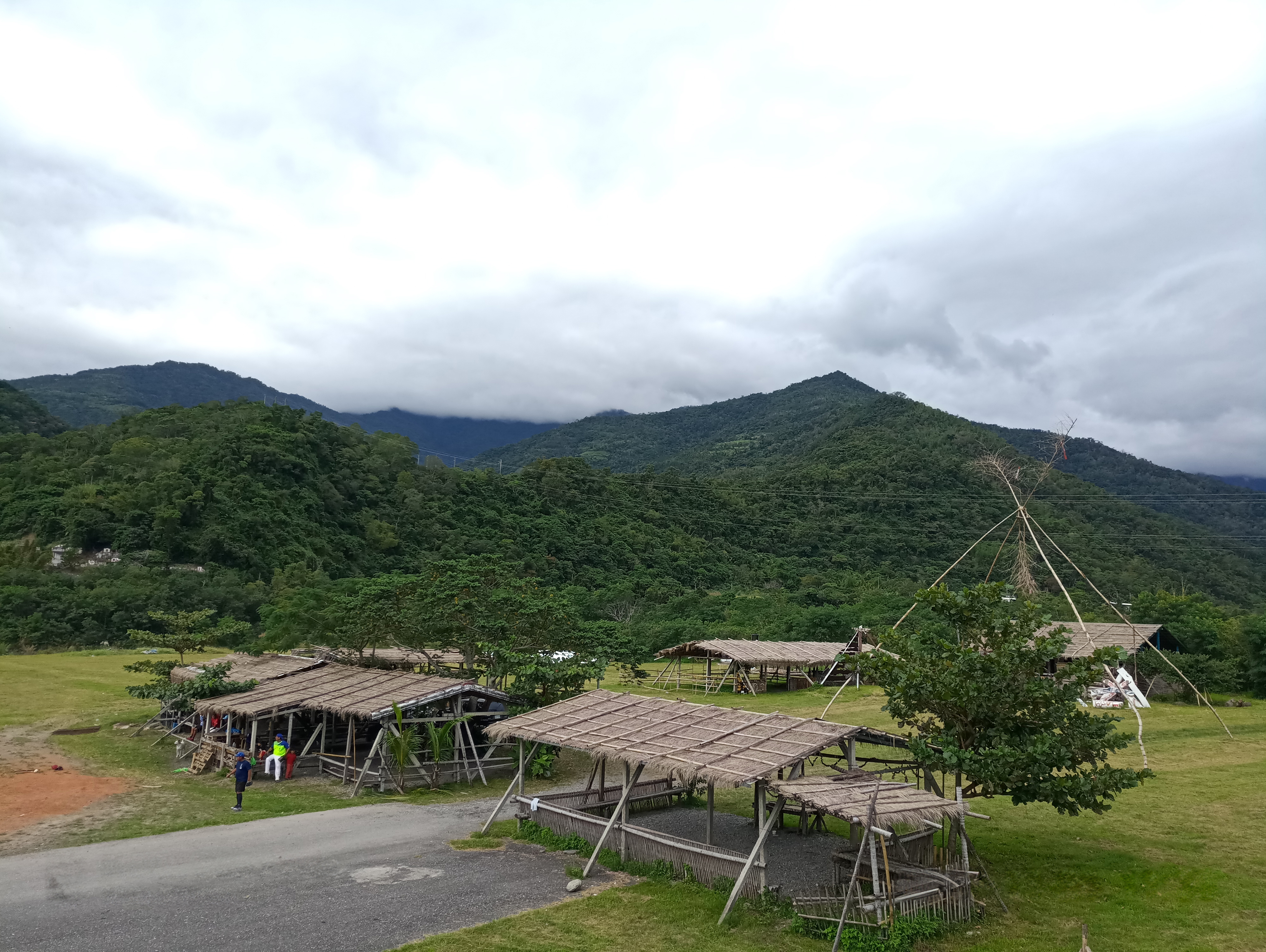
Taromak tribal gathering site of the Rukai people

== Tourist attractions ==
- Baiyu Waterfall
- Chu Lu Ranch
- Jhihben National Forest Recreation Area
- Cingjue Temple
- Taromak Monument
- Yuan Sen Applied Botanical Garden
- Jhihben Hot Spring

== Transportation ==
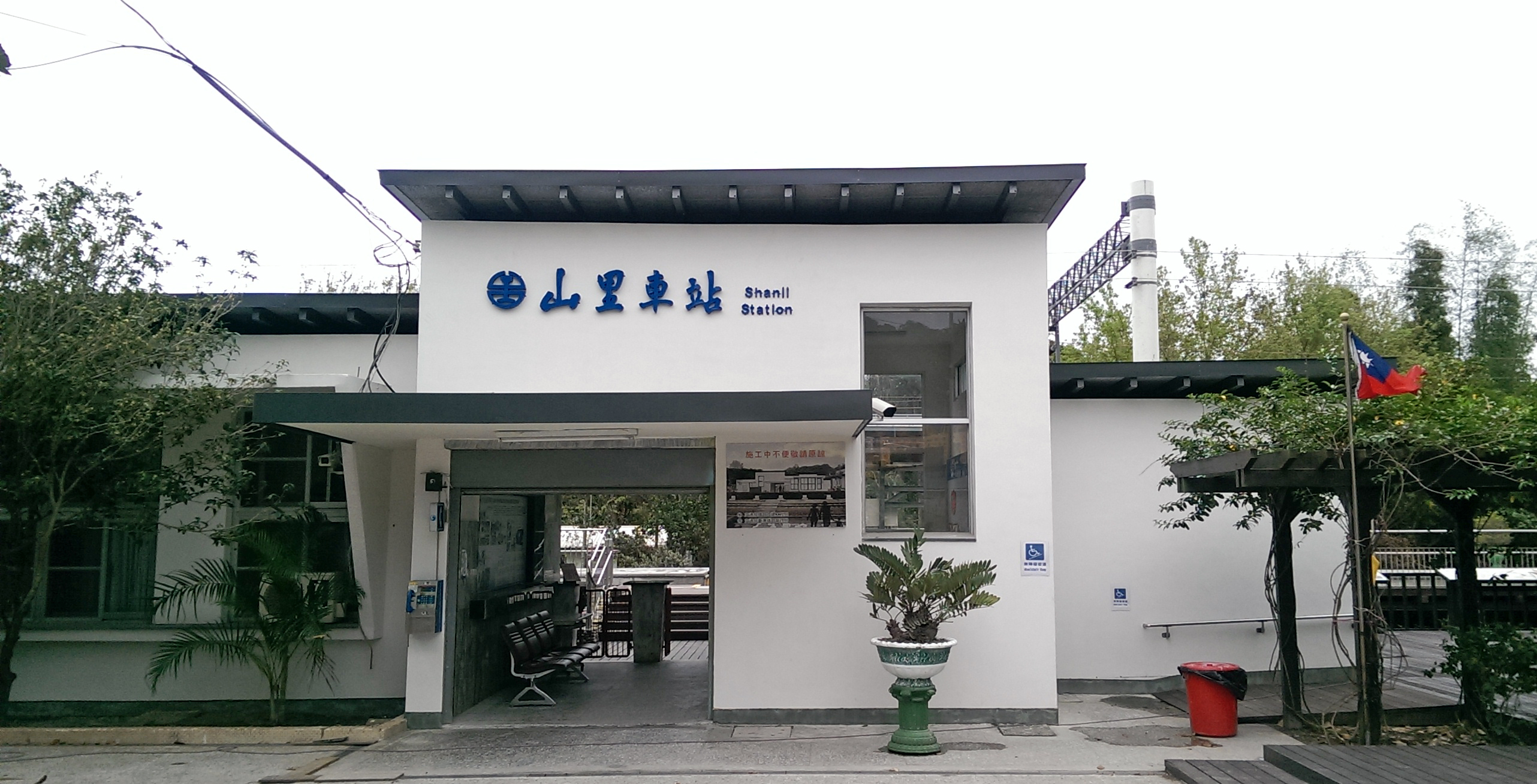
Shanli Station

Beinan Township is accessible from Shanli Station of Taiwan Railway.

== Notable natives ==
- A-mei, singer and songwriter
- Lin Shu-ling, activist
