= Shanli railway station =

Railway station located in Taitung, Taiwan

Shanli Station 山里車站
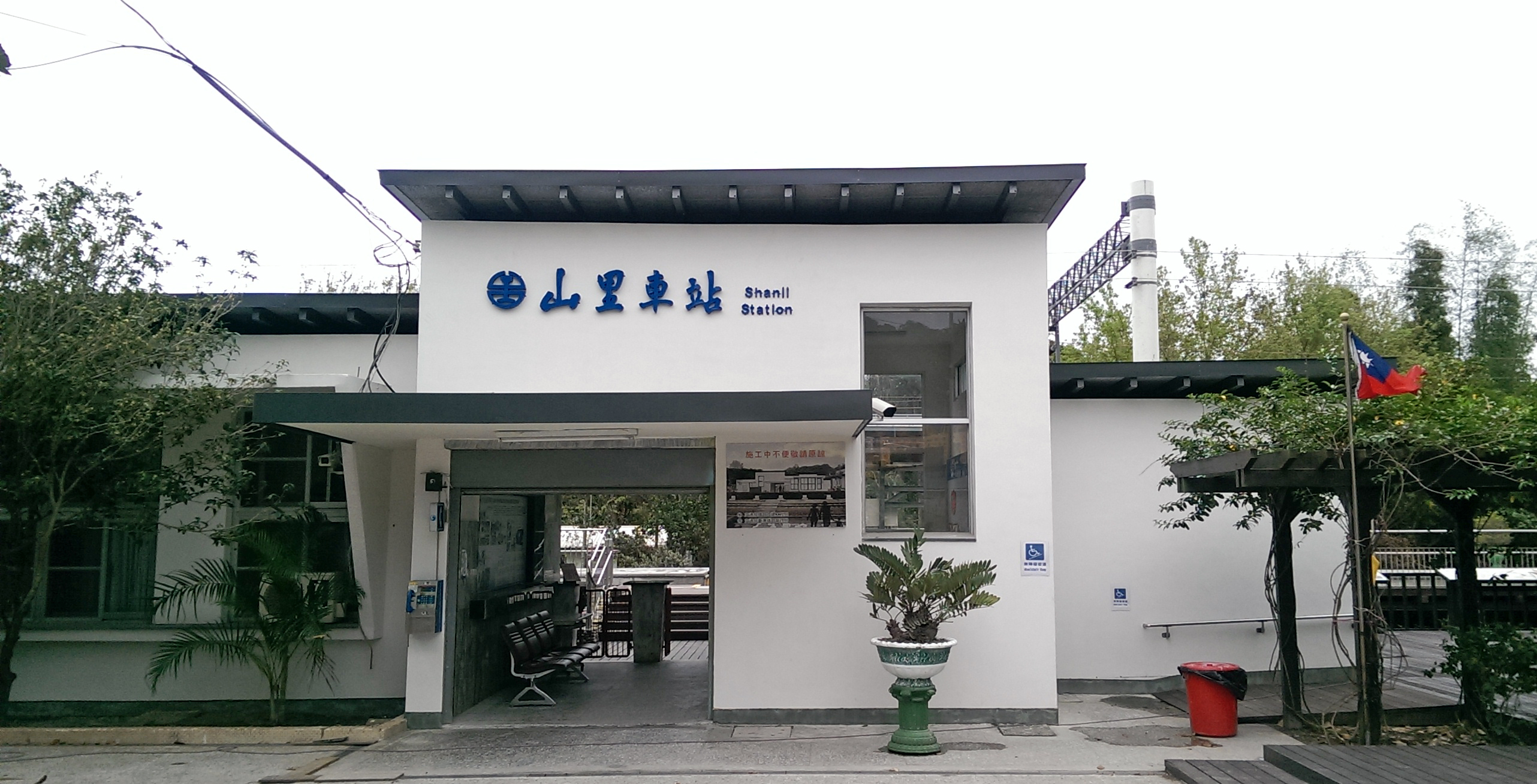
- Station entrance

Chinese name
- Traditional Chinese: 山里車站
Transcriptions
Standard Mandarin
- Hanyu Pinyin: Shānlǐ Chēzhàn
- Bopomofo: ㄕㄢ ㄌㄧˇ ㄔㄜ ㄓㄢˋ

General information
- Location: Beinan, Taitung; Taiwan
- Coordinates: 22°51′42.9″N 121°08′16.0″E
- System: Taiwan Railway railway station
- Line: Taitung line
- Distance: 142.8 km to Hualien
- Platforms: 1 side platform 1 island platform

Construction
- Structure type: At-grade

Other information
- Station code: 006

History
- Opened: 27 June 1982

Passengers
- 2017: 2,181 per year
- Rank: 223

Services
Preceding station	Taiwan Railway	Following station
Luye towards Badu	Eastern Trunk line	Taitung Terminus
Location

Shanli railway station (Chinese: 山里車站; pinyin: Shānlǐ Chēzhàn) is a railway station located in Beinan Township, Taitung County, Taiwan. It is located on the Taitung line and is operated by Taiwan Railway.
