= Miramar Huang family =

Taiwanese business family

The Miramar Huang family (Chinese: 美麗華黃家) is a Taiwanese business family that encompasses three generations of Huangs spread across several branches of the family tree.

== History ==
Born into a farming family of ten siblings, the Huang brothers started a brick kiln and duck feather collection business on the banks of the Keelung River in the 1950s and 1960s. Huang Hsing-chung (黃杏中), Huang Jung-hua (黃榮華), Huang Jung-tu (黃榮圖), and Huang Ku-jung (黃固榮) went on to found Miramar Group, with interests in food, construction, transportation, real estate, hotels, and shopping malls.

While some members of the family became known for their tabloid lifestyles, others are "conservative and low-key".

In 2015, second-generation inheritance feuding amongst Huang Jung-tu's (黃榮圖) offspring culminated in the Miramar murders, a triple fratricide/suicide at a Huang company headquarters.
