= Duoliang Station =

Former railway station in Taimali, Taitung County, Taiwan

- 多良車站
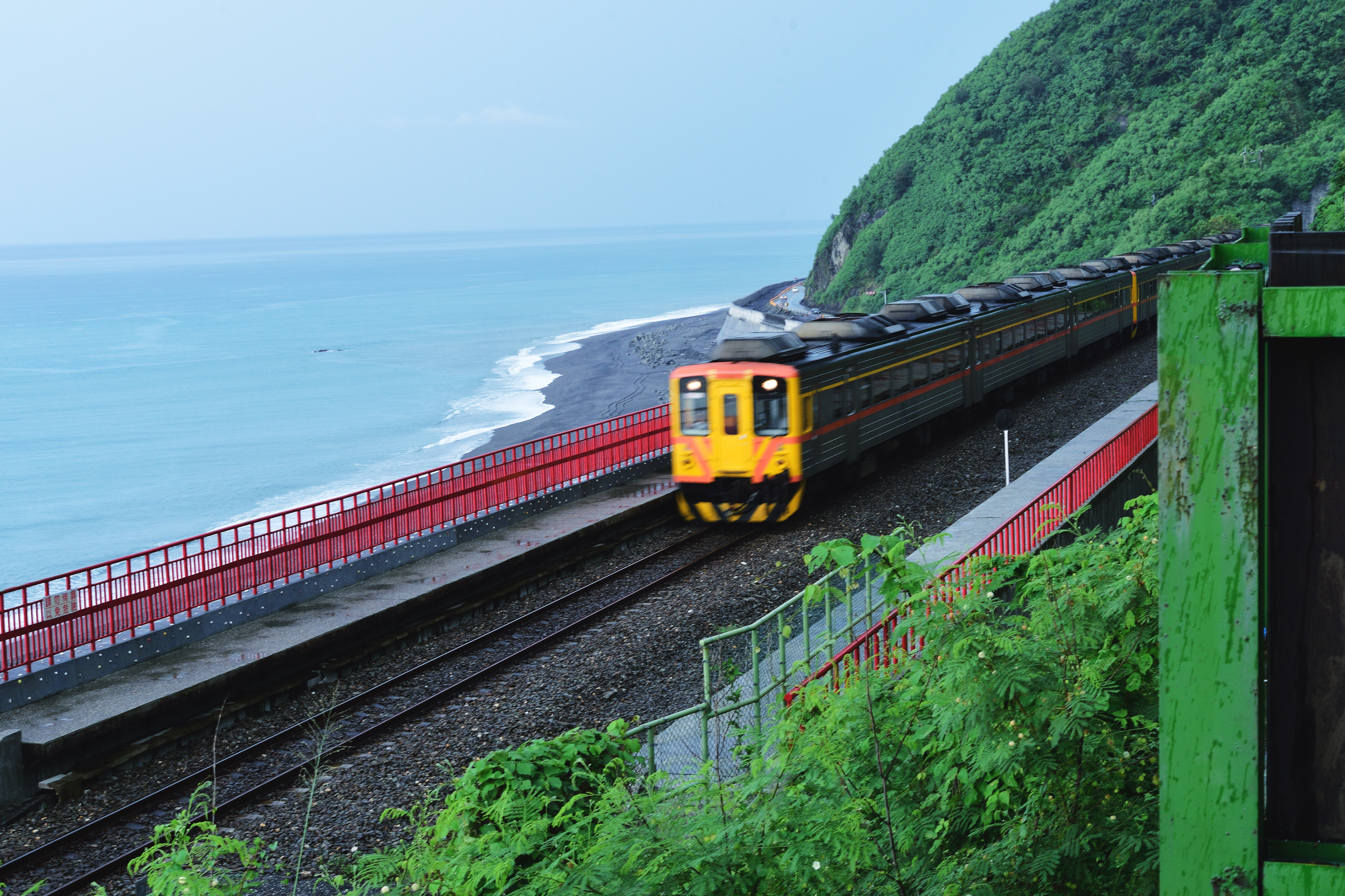
- Interactive map of the Duoliang Station area

General information
- Type: former railway station
- Location: Taimali, Taitung County, Taiwan
- Coordinates: 22°30′27.0″N 120°57′32.0″E
- Inaugurated: October 1992
- Closed: 2006

The Duoliang Station (traditional Chinese: 多良車站; simplified Chinese: 多良车站; pinyin: Duōliáng Chēzhàn) is a former railway station in Duoliang Village, Taimali Township, Taitung County, Taiwan. It has become a popular tourist attraction, with the platform turned into an observation deck overlooking the rail track and the Pacific coastline.

== History ==
The station was inaugurated in October 1992. On 1 October 2006 the station was closed due to low passenger traffic. After that, the roads connecting the platform were removed. On 31 March 2019, the station was closed for upgrading works. The local government made a small renovation work at the former station building where they expanded the observation deck above the tracks. On 1 February 2021, the station began charging visitors entrance fee to the station which is used as cleaning fee.

== Transportation ==
The station is located along and parallel with Provincial Highway 9.

== See also ==
- List of tourist attractions in Taiwan
