= Shouka =

Shouka may refer to:

- Shouka (album), an album by Mariem Hassan
- Shouka (mountain pass), a mountain pass in southern Taiwan
