= South Link Highway =

Highway in Taiwan

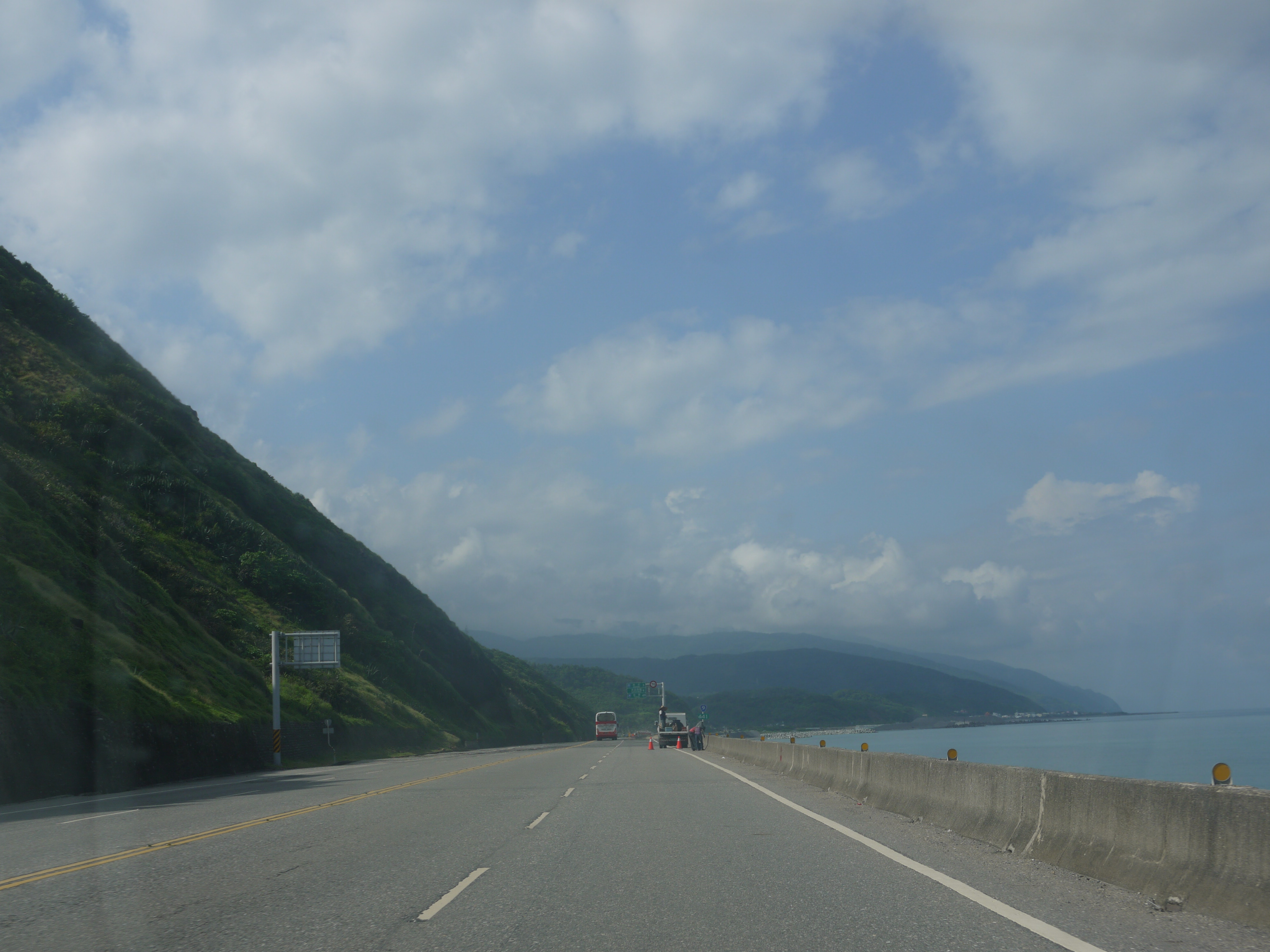
The South Link Highway running along the coastline in Taitung County

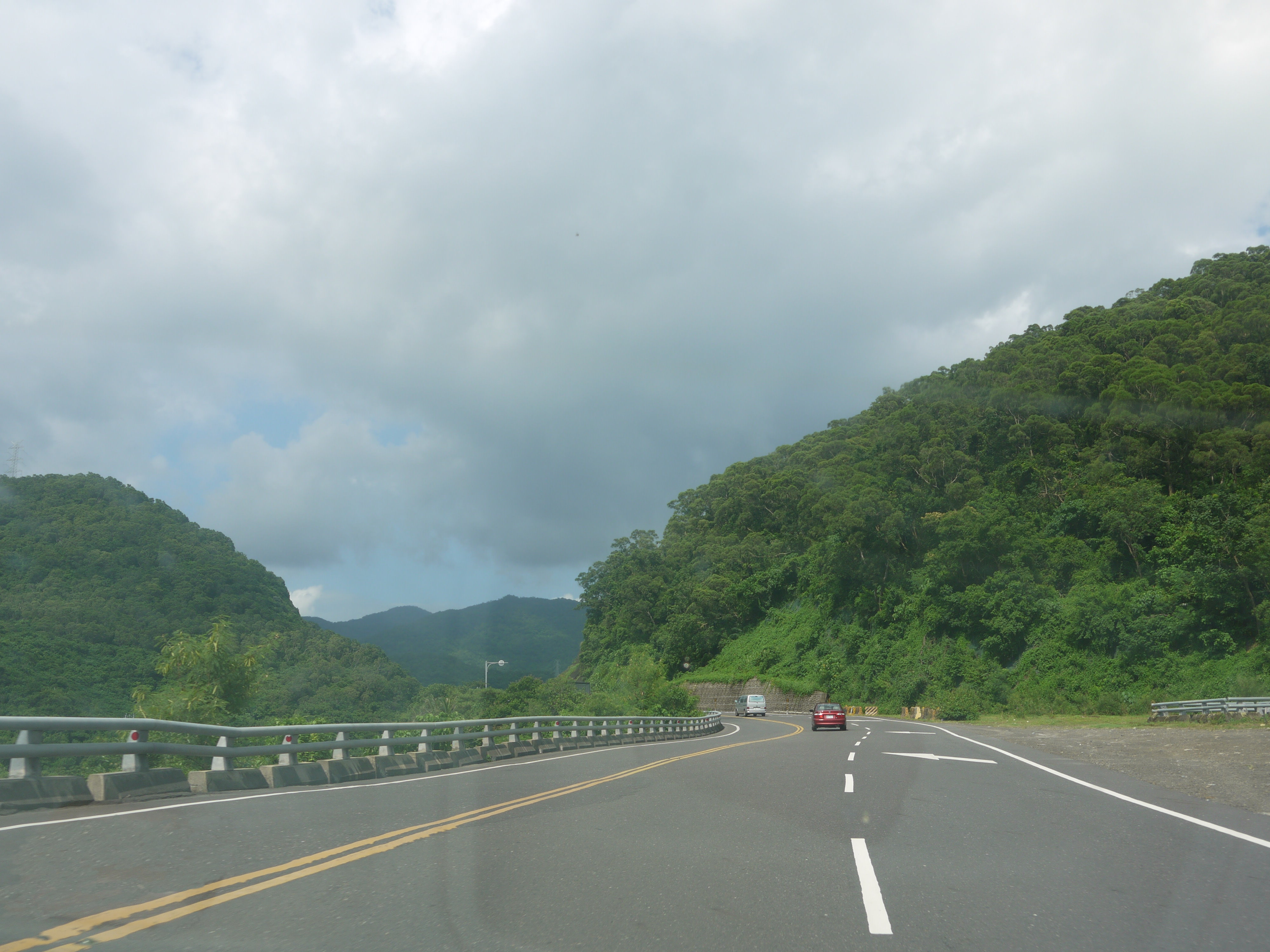
The section of South Link Highway in Shizi Township, Pintung County

The South Link Highway is a section of Provincial Highway No. 9 from Taitung City to Fenggang, Pingtung County, in Taiwan. The section of the highway from Taitung to Ansuo is coastal road, the rest passes through the Central Mountain Range through Shouka until reaching Fenggang at the end.

== History ==
It was built by the Japanese government between 1933 and 1939.

== Route ==
The length of the highway is about 90 km. This highway goes from Taitung City, and runs through Taimali, Dawu, Daren, and Shizi, and ends in Fenggang, Fangshan Township, Pingtung.

== Bridges ==
- Jinlun Bridge
