= Jinlun Bridge =

Bridge in Taimali, Taitung County, Taiwan

Jinlun Bridge 金崙大橋
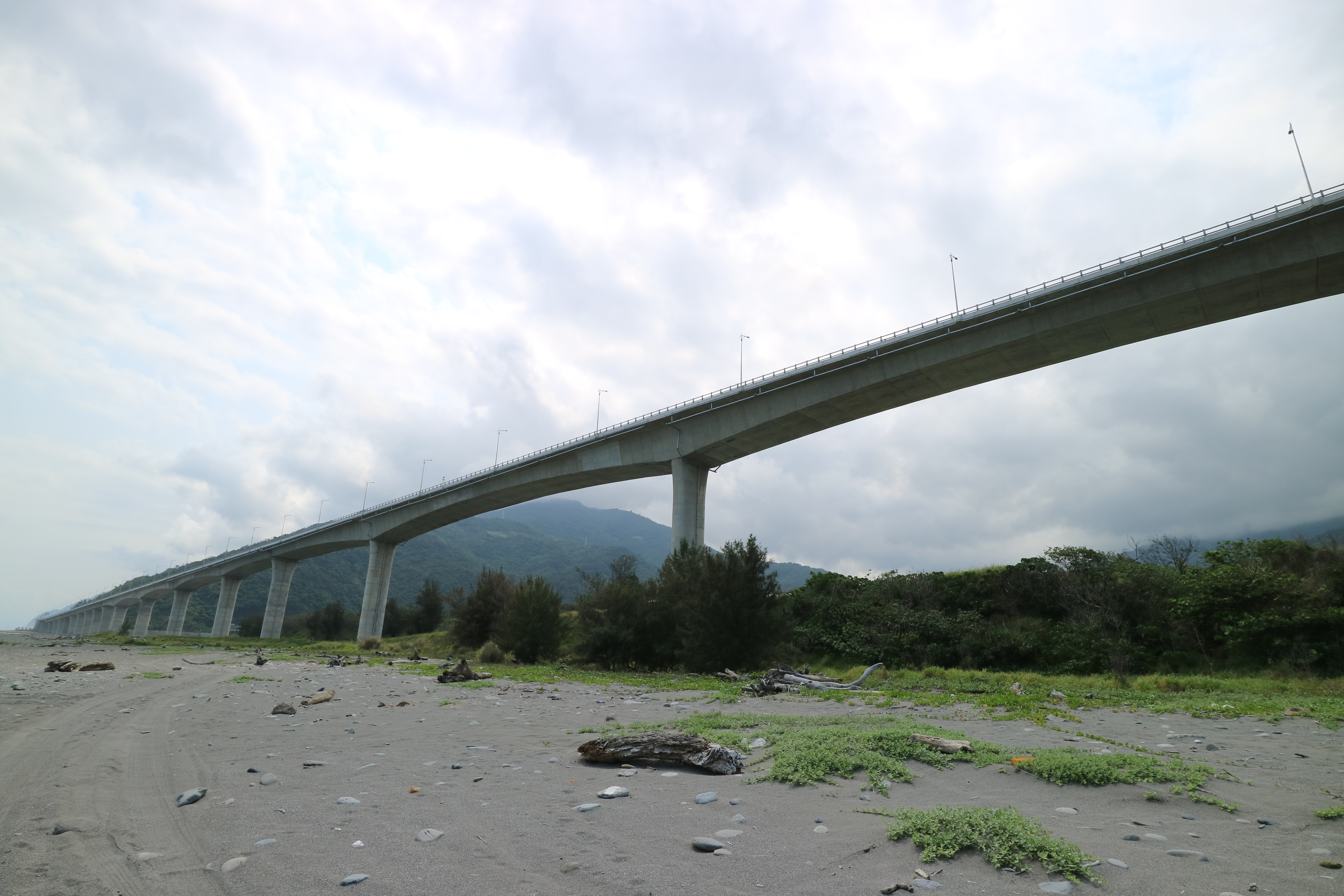
- Coordinates: 22°31′41.69″N 120°58′2.08″E
- Locale: Taimali, Taitung County, Taiwan

Characteristics
- Design: bridge
- Total length: 3.25 km
- Width: 14 m
- Height: 40 meters
- Longest span: 125 m
- No. of lanes: 4

History
- Opened: 15 October 2017

Location
- Interactive map of Jinlun Bridge

The Jinlun Bridge (traditional Chinese: 金崙大橋; simplified Chinese: 金仑大桥; pinyin: Jīnlún Dàqiáo) is a bridge in Taimali Township, Taitung County, Taiwan. It is part of the South-Link Highway.

== History ==
The bridge was constructed as an improvement plan for Provincial Highway 9. It was opened for traffic on 15 October 2017.

== Architecture ==
The bridge spans over a length of 3.25 km with the maximum height of 40 meters above sea level.

== See also ==
- List of bridges in Taiwan
- Transportation in Taiwan
