= Longxi railway station =

Railway station in Taimali, Taitung County, Taiwan

Longxi Railway Station 瀧溪車站
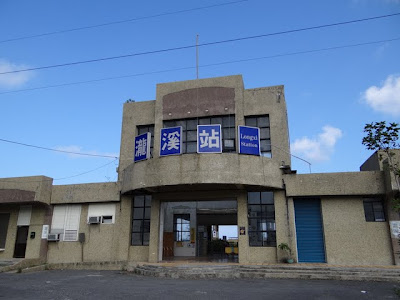

General information
- Location: Taimali, Taitung County, Taiwan
- Coordinates: 22°27′39.0″N 120°56′30.8″E
- System: Train station
- Owner: Taiwan Railway Corporation
- Operator: Taiwan Railway Corporation
- Line: South-link
- Train operators: Taiwan Railway Corporation

History
- Opened: 5 October 1992

Passengers
- 48 daily (2024)
Location

Longxi (Chinese: 瀧溪車站; pinyin: Lóngxī Chēzhàn) is a railway station on Taiwan Railway South-link line located in Taimali Township, Taitung County, Taiwan.

== History ==
The station was opened on 5 October 1992.

== See also ==
- List of railway stations in Taiwan

Preceding station	Taiwan Railway	Following station
Dawu towards Pingtung	South-link line	Jinlun towards Taitung
