= Jinlun railway station =

Railway station in Taimali, Taitung County, Taiwan

Jinlun Railway Station 金崙車站
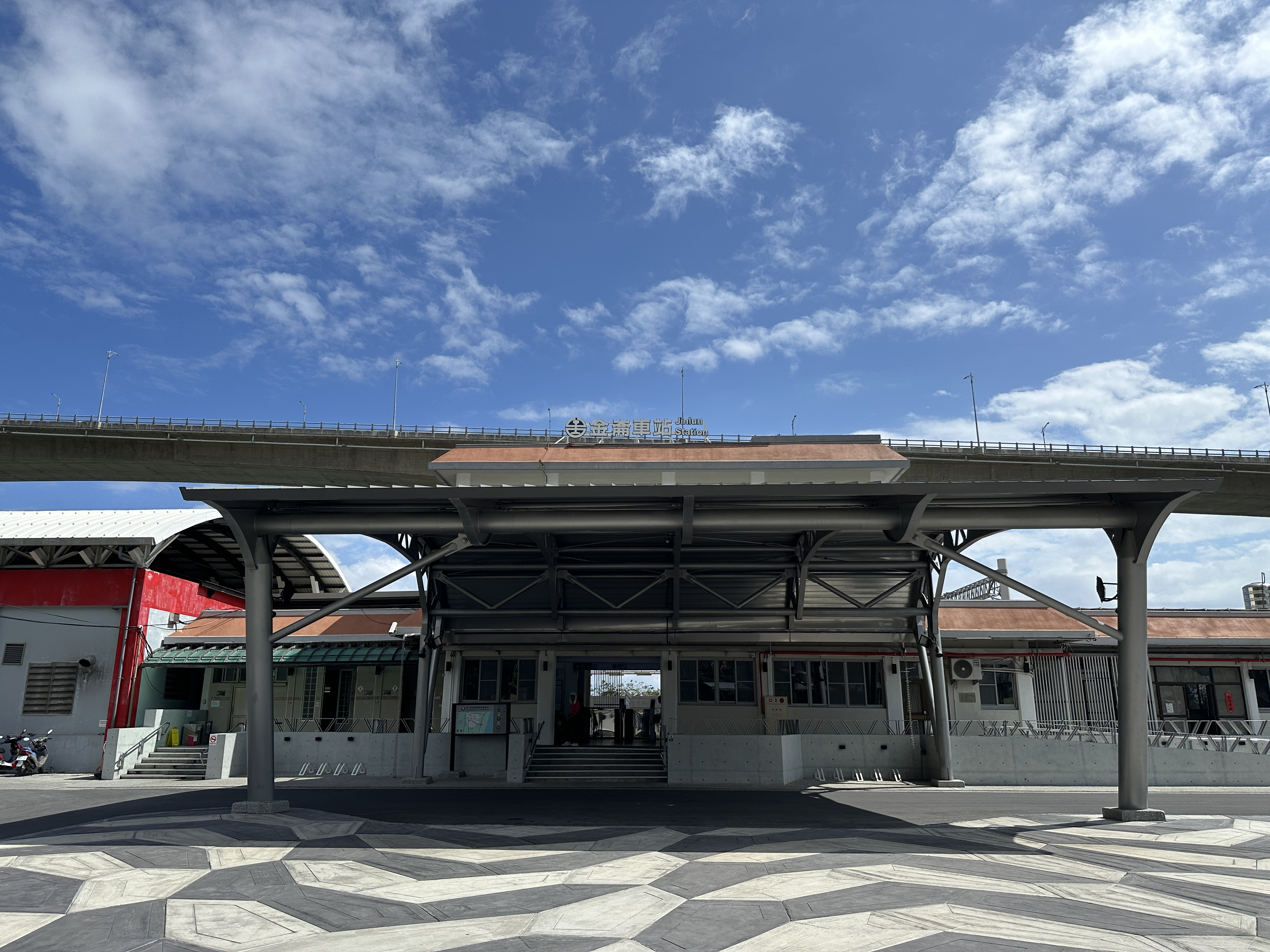
- Photographed on February 15, 2026

General information
- Location: Taimali, Taitung County, Taiwan
- Coordinates: 22°31′52.9″N 120°58′02.6″E
- System: Train station
- Owner: Taiwan Railway Corporation
- Operator: Taiwan Railway Corporation
- Line: South-link line
- Train operators: Taiwan Railway Corporation

History
- Opened: 5 October 1992

Passengers
- 1,147 daily (2024)
Location

Jinlun (Chinese: 金崙車站; pinyin: Jīnlún Chēzhàn) is a railway station on Taiwan Railway South-link line located in Taimali Township, Taitung County, Taiwan.

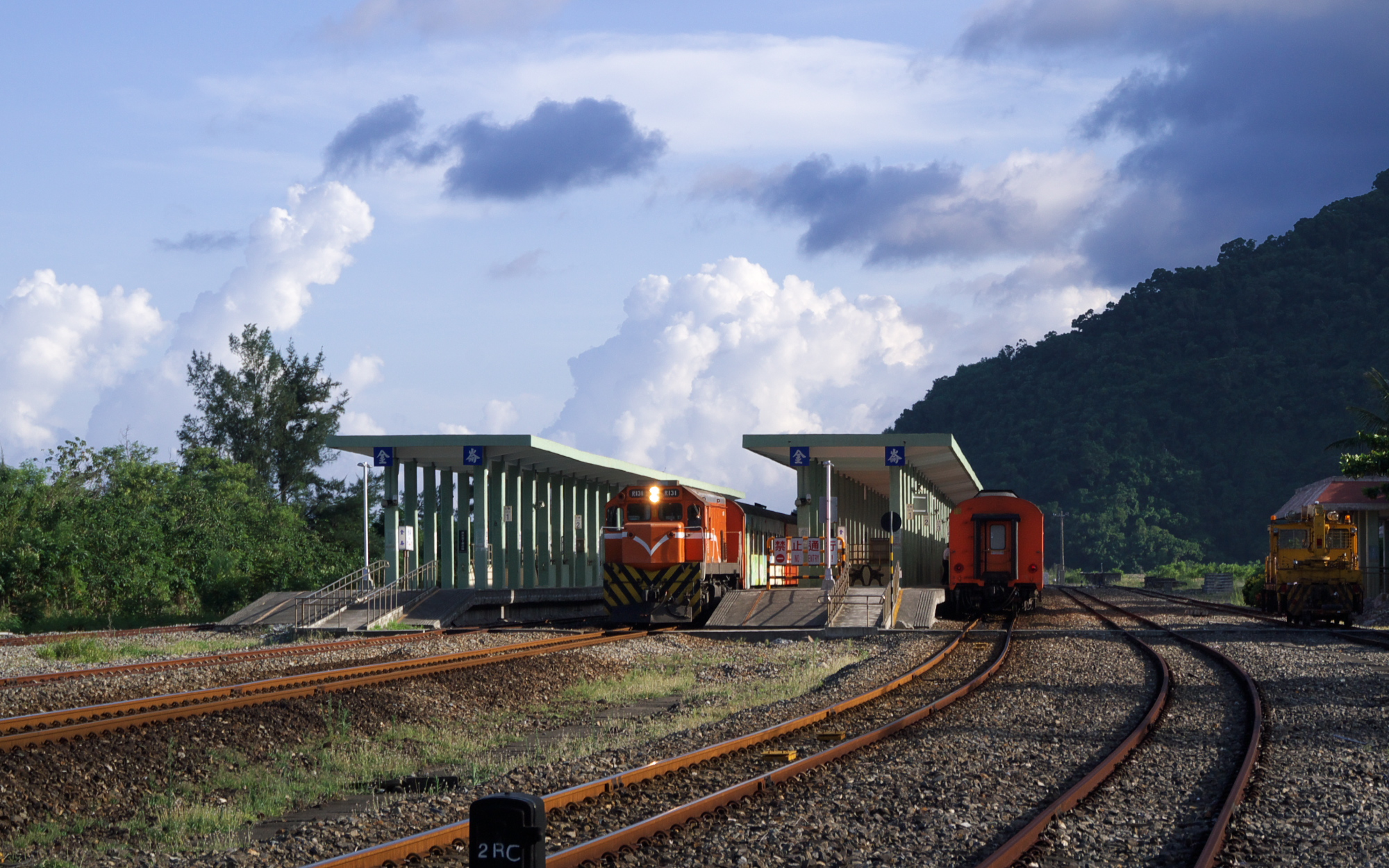
Jinlun station platform

== History ==
The station was opened on 5 October 1992.

== See also ==
- List of railway stations in Taiwan

Preceding station	Taiwan Railway	Following station
Longxi towards Pingtung	South-link line	Taimali towards Taitung
