= Shouka (mountain pass) =

Mountain pass in southern Taiwan

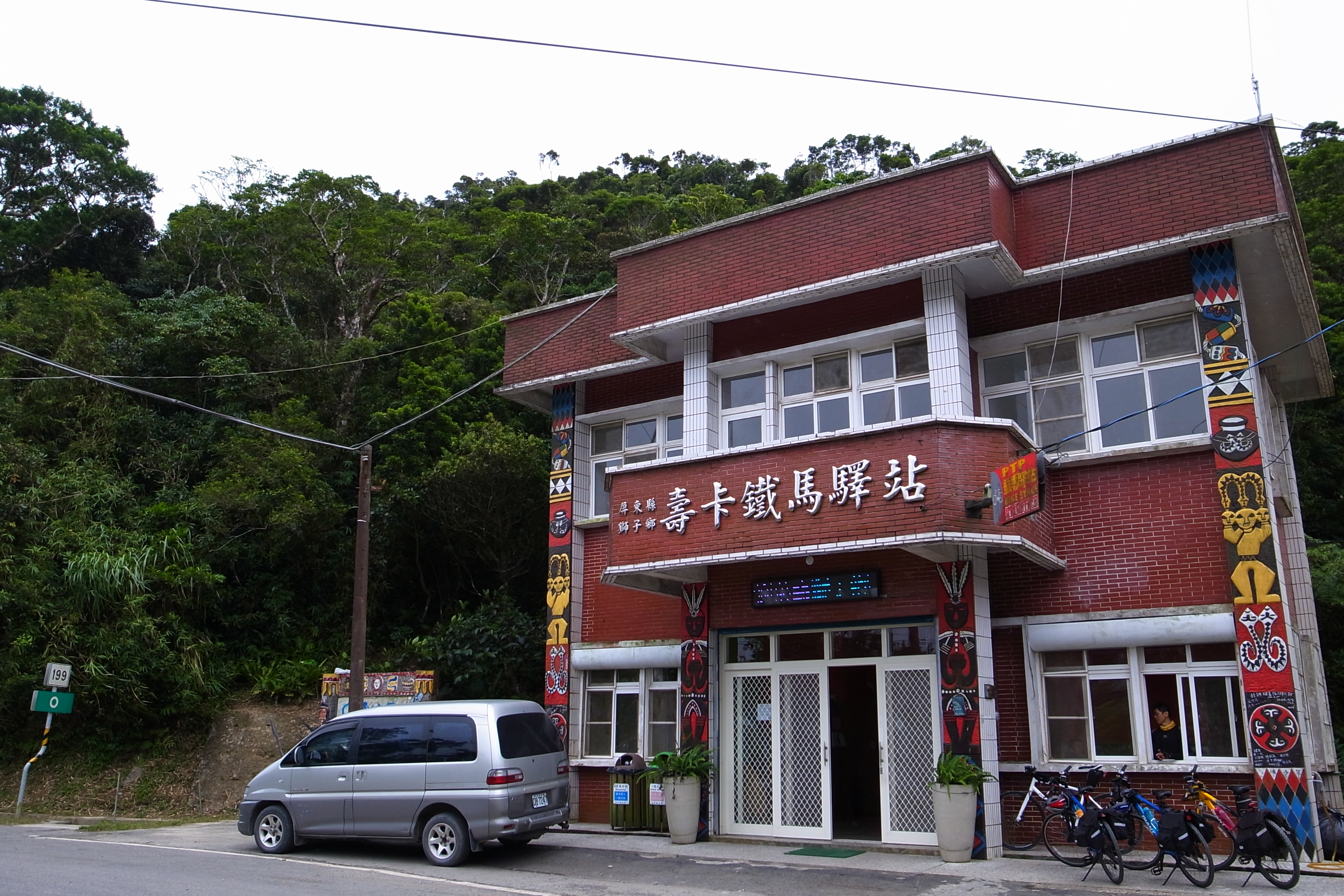
- Bicycle rest stop at Shouka

- Location within Taiwan
- Elevation: 460 metres (1,510 ft)
- Traversed by: Provincial Highway 9 County Highway 199

Third Approach
- Location: Border of Shizi, Pingtung and Daren, Taitung, Taiwan
- Range: Central Mountain Range
- Coordinates: 22°14′43″N 120°50′08″E

Shouka (Chinese: 壽峠; pinyin: Shòukǎ, alternatively 壽卡, el. 460 m), formerly known as Kotobuki Pass (寿峠, Kotobuki-tōge), is a mountain pass located in southern Taiwan, transversing the Central Mountain Range. Administratively, Shouka is at the border of Shizi, Pingtung and Daren, Taitung.

Shouka is a major intersection in road travel in Taiwan, bringing together traffic from Kaohsiung, Taitung City, and Kenting. It is the highest point of the South-Link Highway and the intersection of Provincial Highway 9 and County Highway 199. The point is also a popular destination for road cyclists.

The character "峠" is a kokuji, a Japanese character that does not appear in Chinese, which is why "卡" is occasionally used in its place.

== History ==
The South-Link Highway was originally built by during Japan's rule over Taiwan. Construction of the highway ran between 1933 and 1939 and became an important link between Taiwan's east coast with the rest of the island. The highest point of this highway was named "Kotobuki Pass" at its completion.

A police checkpoint once stood at Shouka, but has been abandoned. The building has been transformed into a rest stop for cyclists.

== Recreation ==
Shouka is a popular destination for road cyclists. Cyclists attempting to cycle around the island of Taiwan must climb up to Shouka, as there is no other road possible between Pingtung and Taitung. It is also one of two sections with substantial elevation gain, the other being Suhua Highway. Taiwan Cycling Route No.1 passes through Shouka. The 22.2 km climb along Provincial Highway 9 from Daren is listed as one of the top 100 cycling climbs in Taiwan, with an average grade of 4.2%.

On April 11, 2009, the Pingtung County government turned a former police checkpoint into the "Shouka Cyclist Rest Stop" (壽卡鐵馬驛站) to accommodate passing cyclists. The staffed rest stop provides water, toilets, and repair tools free of charge for cyclists. The Water Resources Agency also operates a rain gauge on top of the rest stop.
