= Taimali railway station =

Railway station in Taimali, Taitung County, Taiwan

Taimali Railway Station 太麻里車站
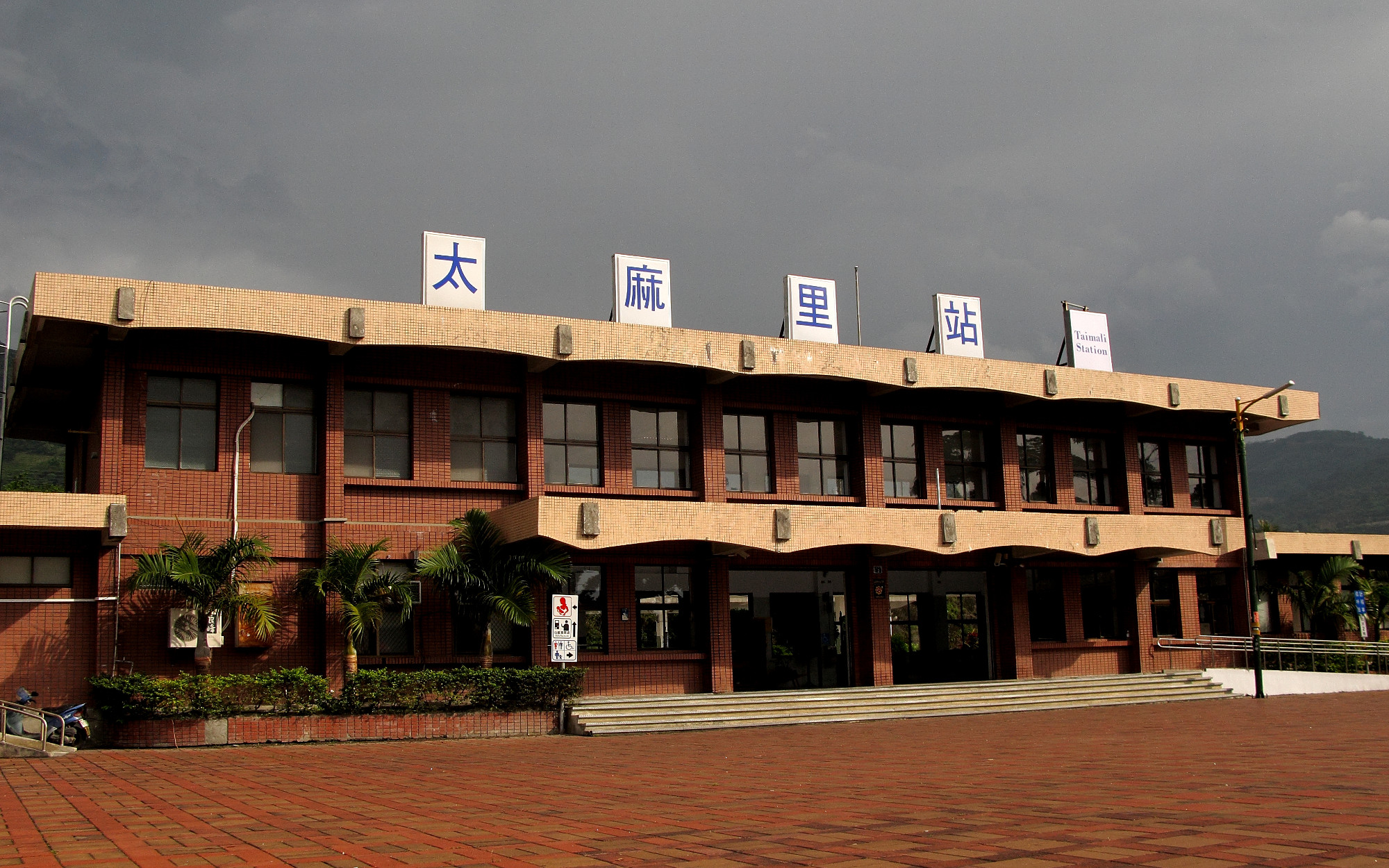

General information
- Location: Taimali, Taitung County, Taiwan
- Coordinates: 22°37′08.9″N 121°00′17.7″E
- System: Train station
- Owner: Taiwan Railway Corporation
- Operator: Taiwan Railway Corporation
- Line: South-link line
- Train operators: Taiwan Railway Corporation

History
- Opened: 1 January 1988

Passengers
- 345 daily (2024)
Location

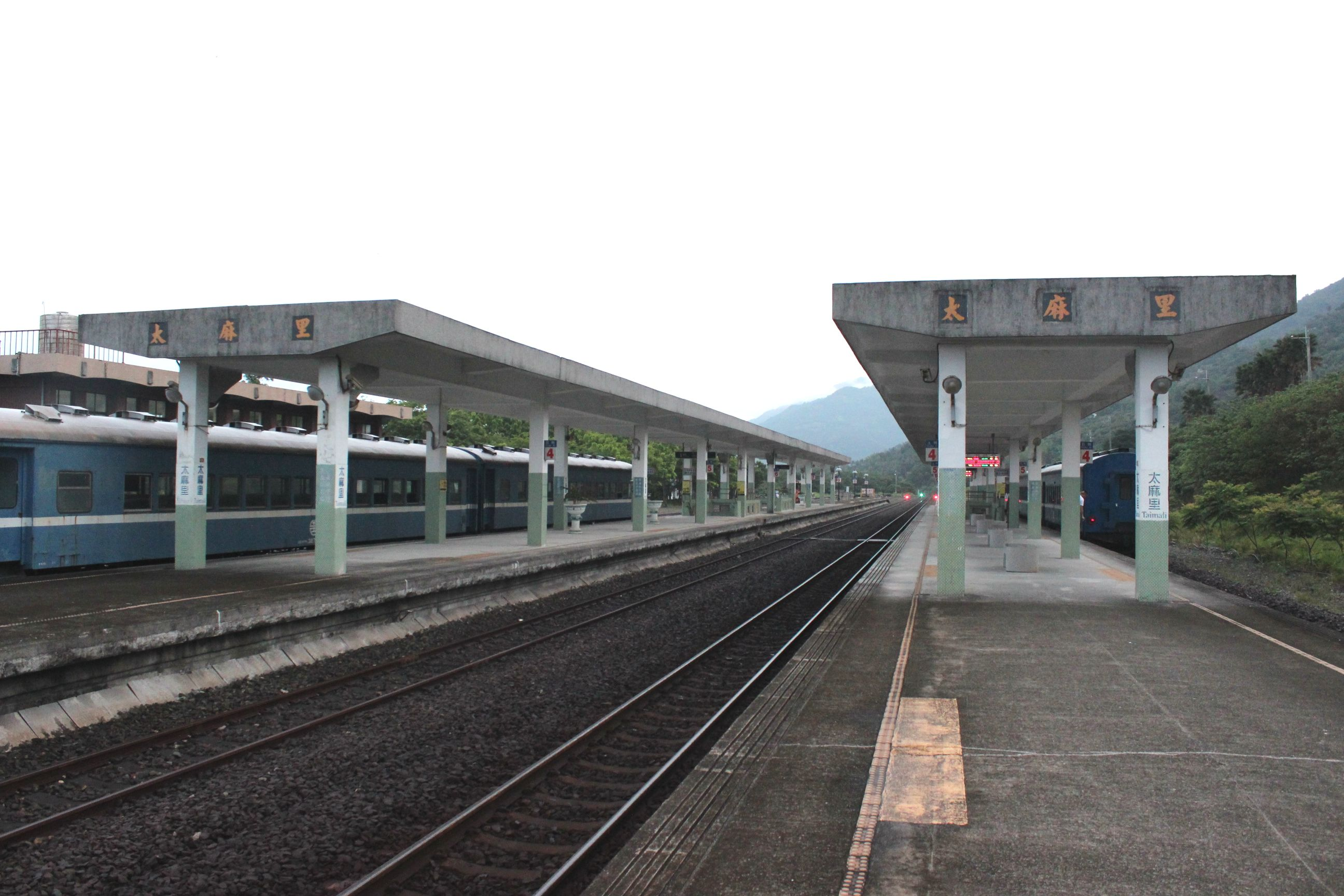
Taimali station platform

Taimali (Chinese: 太麻里車站; pinyin: Tàimálǐ Chēzhàn) is a railway station on Taiwan Railway South-link line located in Taimali Township, Taitung County, Taiwan.

== History ==
The station was opened on 1 January 1988.

== See also ==
- List of railway stations in Taiwan

Preceding station	Taiwan Railway	Following station
Jinlun towards Pingtung	South-link line	Zhiben towards Taitung
