= Taimali =

Rural township in Taitung County, Taiwan

Coordinates: 22°37′N 121°00′E

Taimali Township 太麻里鄉 Tamari
- Rural township
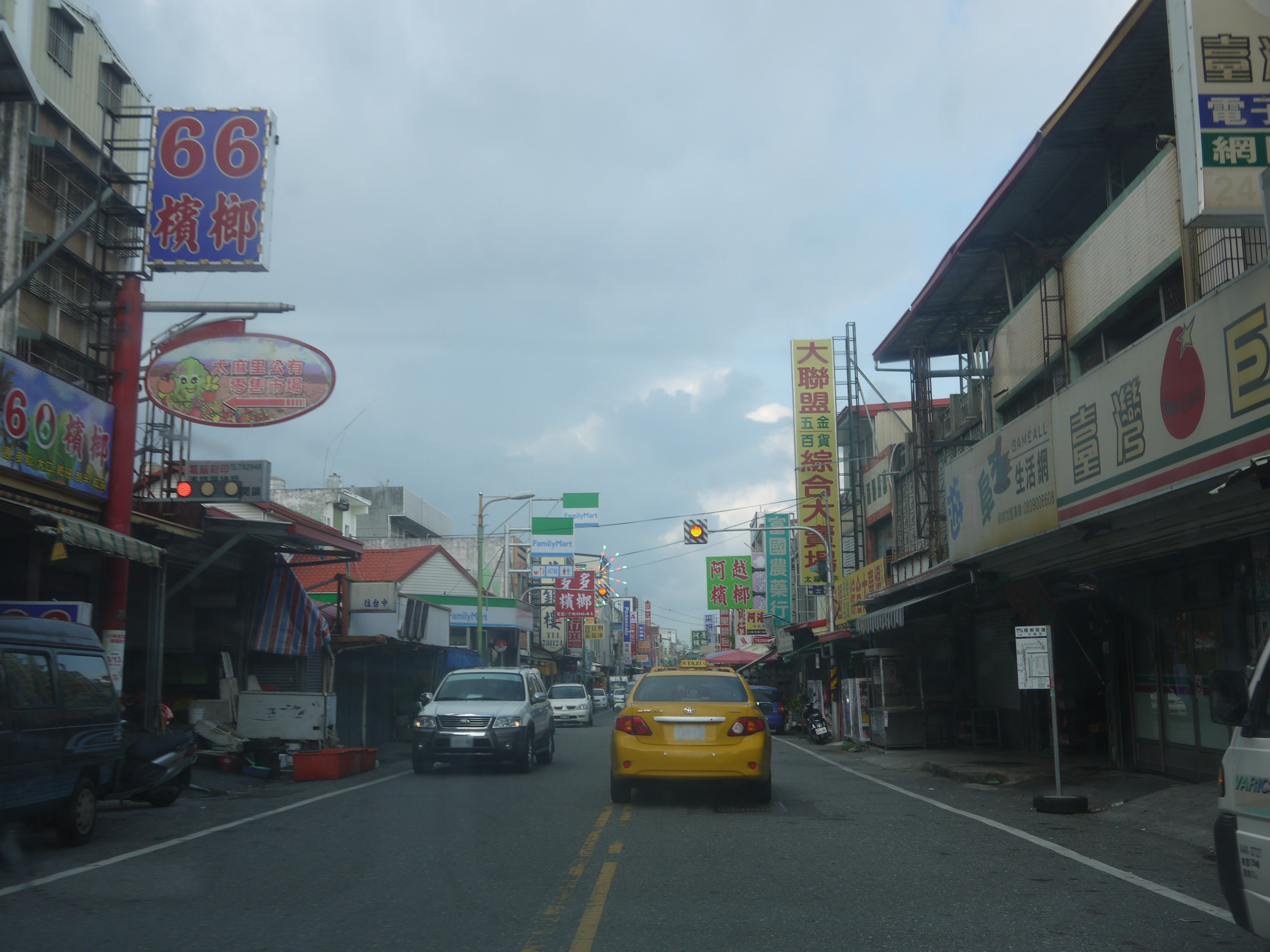

- Taimali Township in Taitung County
- Location: Taitung County, Taiwan

Area
  - Total: 97 km^{2} (37 sq mi)

Population (September 2023)
  - Total: 10,723
  - Density: 110/km^{2} (290/sq mi)

Taimali Township (Chinese: 太麻里鄉; pinyin: Tàimálǐ Xiāng) is a rural township in Taitung County, Taiwan. It has a population of 10,763 in 96.6523 km^{2} area. Taimali Township is located on the Pacific coast. The indigenous Amis and Paiwan peoples make up one-third of the population.

== History ==
Tjavualji was established 1,000 years ago by the Qian YaoKao, also called the Da Ma, who were ancestors of the Paiwan people. Qing era records show the placename written variously (Chinese: 兆貓裡/朝貓籬/大貓狸/大麻里), etc. According to Paiwan legend it had been called "the village of sunrise" (Jabauli or Tjavualji in Paiwan language) because there the sun rises from the eastern sea.

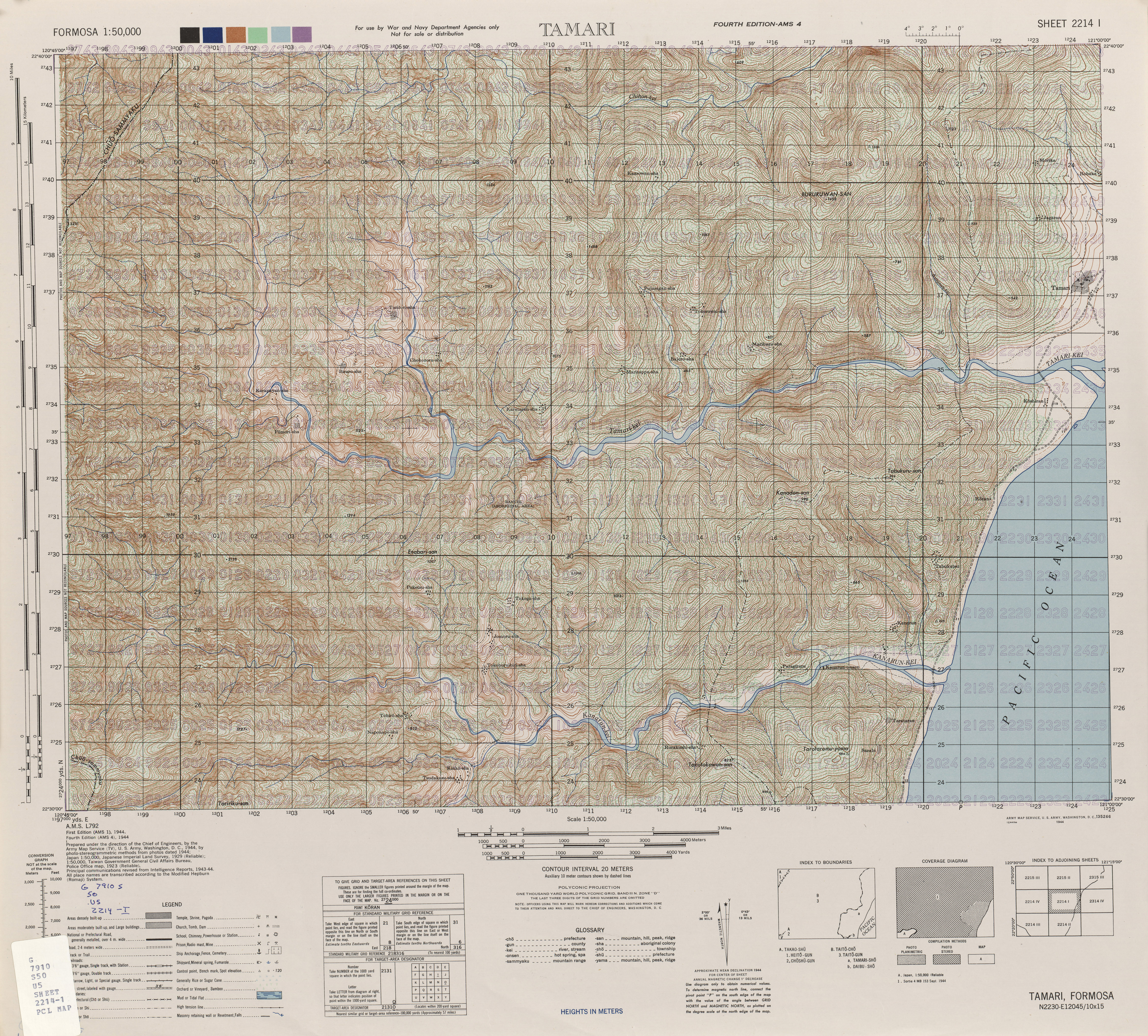
Map of Taimali (labeled as Tamari) and surrounding area (1944)

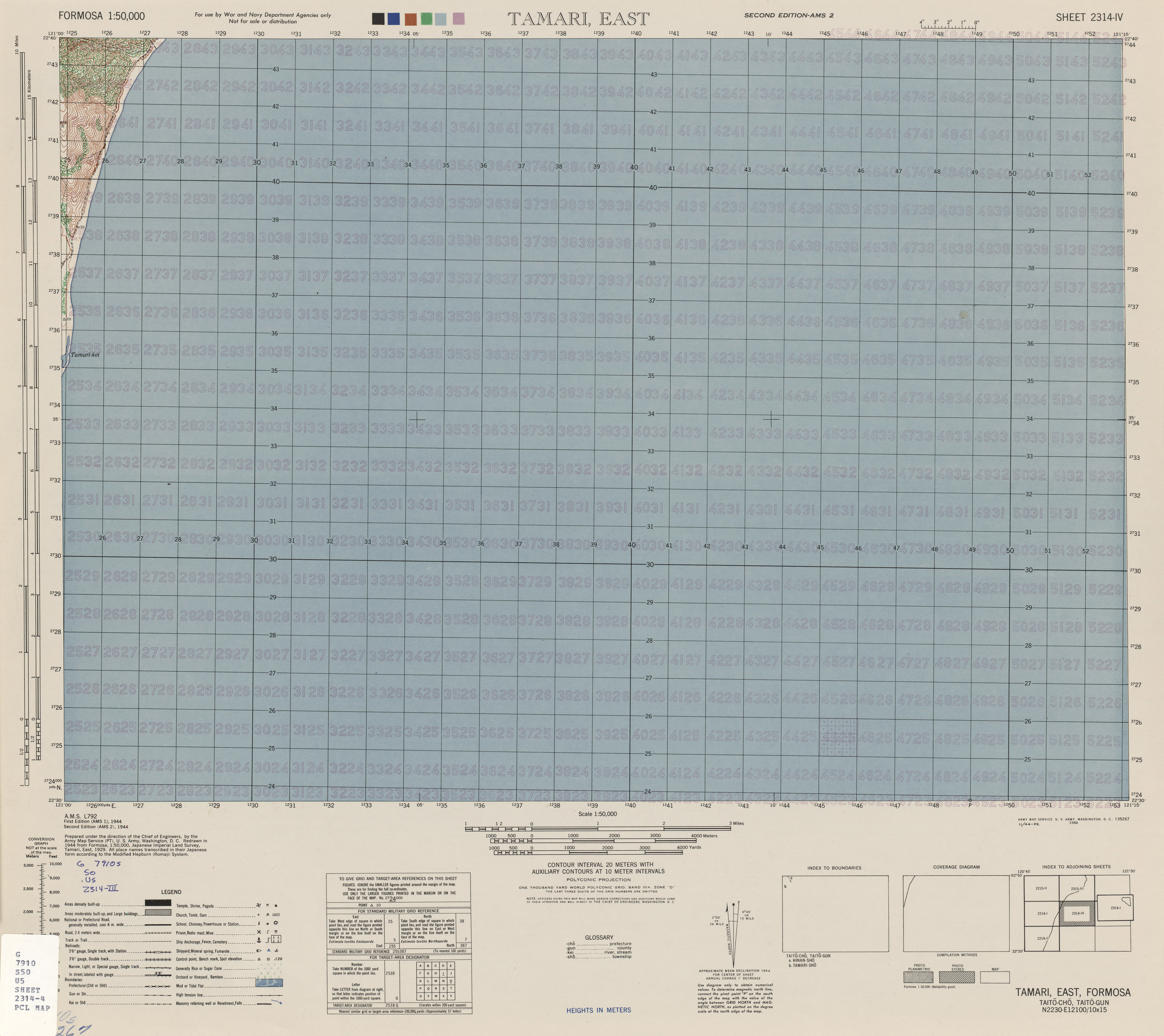
Map of the area immediately east of Taimali (1944)

In the early 1900s (under Japanese rule), the Amis and additional Paiwan were moved to the village. In 1920, the village was officially called Tamari (太麻里), written with the same characters as it still is today. During the 1940s (also under Japanese rule), some residents from Miaoli, Nantou, Changhua, Yunlin, Chiayi, Tainan, Kaohsiung, and Pingtung also settled in the area. Due to the increasing population, the Japanese government subordinated the village to Taitō District, Taitō Prefecture, and in 1937, its official name was changed to Tamari Village (太麻里庄).

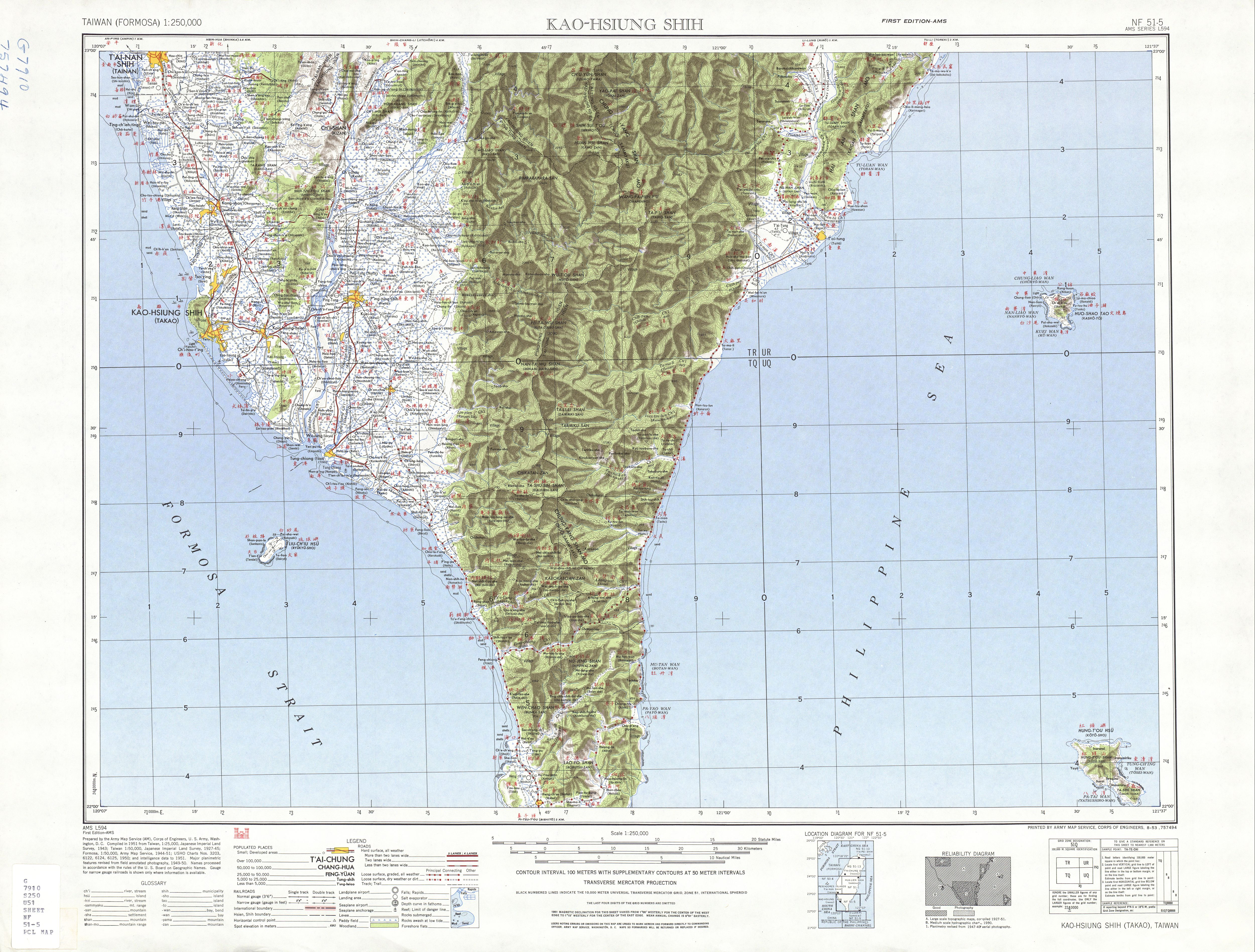
Map of the region including Taimali (labeled as Ta-ma-li (Tamar [sic]) 大麻里) (1951)

After Taiwan was handed over from Japan to the Republic of China in 1945, the name was modified to Taimali Village (太麻里村), changing the word for "village" while keeping the other characters, but pronouncing them according to their Mandarin Chinese readings rather than their Japanese ones.

== Administrative divisions ==
The township comprises nine villages: Beili, Dawang, Duoliang, Huayuan, Jinlun, Meihe, Sanhe, Taihe and Xianglan.

== Tourist attractions ==
- Duoliang Station
- Aboriginal People Ancestor's Birthplace Stele
- Fushan Park
- Jinjhen Mountain Agriculture Areas
- Kimlun Hot Springs Scenic Areas
- Millennium Dawn Commemorate Parks
- Sanho Waterfront Park

== Transportation ==
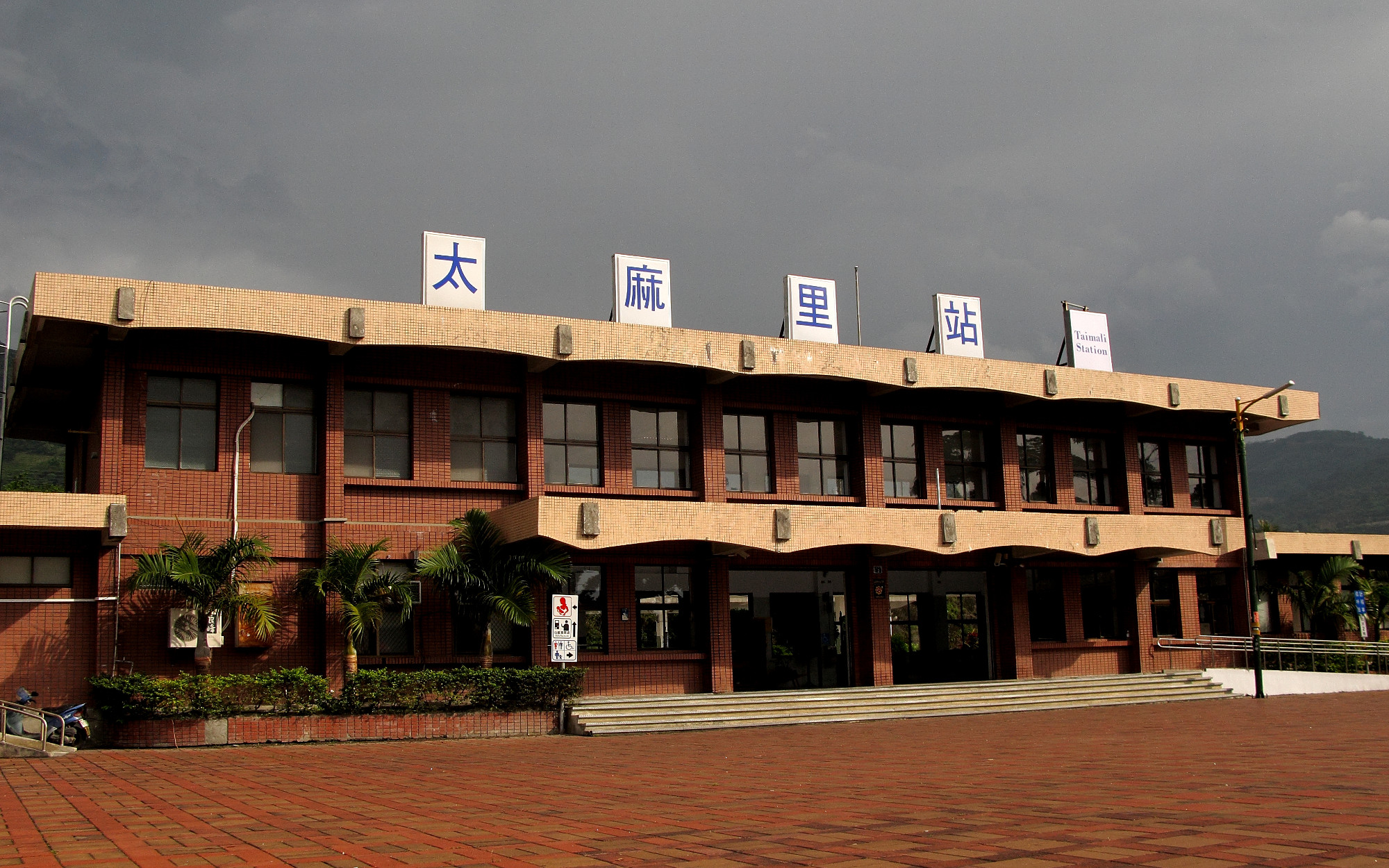
TRA Taimali Station

- TR - South-link line
  - Jinlun Station
  - Longxi Station
  - Taimali Station
- Provincial Highway 9
- Jinlun Bridge
