= Provincial Highway 9 (Taiwan) =

Road in Taiwan

Provincial Highway 9
- 台9線

Route information
- Maintained by Directorate General of Highways
- Length: 453.851 km (282.010 mi)

Major junctions
- North end: Prov 1 Prov 1a Prov 3 Prov 5 in Zhongzheng District, Taipei
- Nat 5 in Toucheng, Yilan and Suao, Yilan
- South end: Prov 1 in Fangshan, Pingtung

Location
- Country: Taiwan

Highway system
- Highway system in Taiwan
← Prov 8	→ Prov 10

Provincial Highway No.9

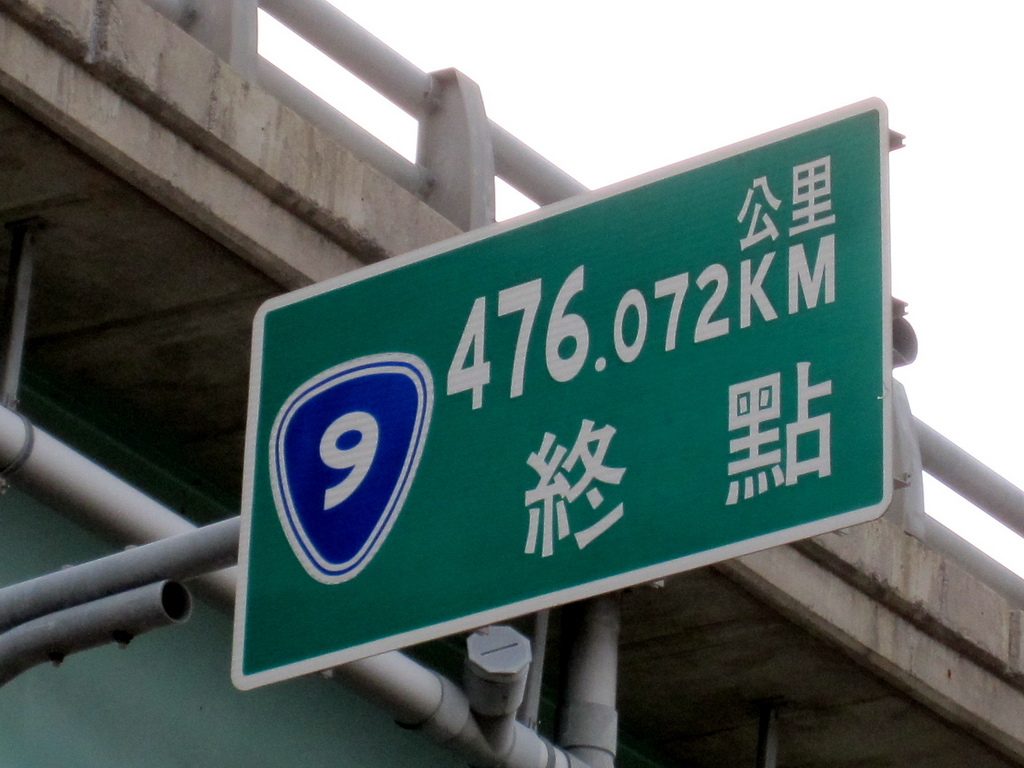
Sign of the south end.

Provincial Highway 9 is an important highway across eastern Taiwan from Taipei City to Fangshan, Pingtung, Pingtung County. This provincial highway, at 453.851 km long, is the second-longest provincial highway in Taiwan and passes the regions of Taipei City, New Taipei City, Yilan County, Hualien County, Taitung County and Pingtung County.

== Route Description ==
The highway begins in front of the Executive Yuan in downtown Taipei. It continues along Zhongshan South Road (中山南路) and Roosevelt Road (羅斯福路) until it reaches Xindian, New Taipei. From there the highway follows Beixin Road (北新路) and later becomes Bei-Yi Highway (北宜公路). The highway passes through mountainous regions and enters Shiding and Pinglin in New Taipei City before reaching Yilan County.

In Yilan County, the highway finally leaves the mountainous region and enters the Yilan Plain, but not before a stretch of curvy mountain roads. The highway passes through Toucheng, Jiaoxi, Yilan City, Wujie, Luodong, and Dongshan before entering Su'ao. From Su'ao to Hualien, the highway is designated as Suhua Highway (蘇花公路), a set of curvy mountain roads known for its sharp curves and cliffs along the route. Suhua Highway passes through Su'ao and Nan'ao in Yilan County, Xiulin and Xincheng in Hualien County before entering Hualien City. In Xincheng the highway intersects the Central Cross-Island Highway, which provides access to Taroko National Park.

From Hualien City to Taitung City in Taitung County, the highway is known as the Huadong Highway (花東公路). The route serves as the primary north–south highway for the Huatung Valley townships. The highway connects the townships of Ji'an, Shoufeng, Fenglin, Guangfu, Ruisui, Yuli, and Fuli in Hualien County, as well as Chishang, Guanshan, Luye, Yanping, and Beinan, before reaching Taitung City.

From Taitung City, the highway is known as the South Link Highway. It continues south towards Taimali, where it meets Provincial Highway 11 and continues along the eastern coast of Taiwan. The highway then passes through Dawu and Daren. After its intersection with Provincial Highway 26 in Ansuo, a village in Daren, the highway turns westbound and cuts through the southern end of the Central Mountain Range, reaching Shouka. The highway continues to Shizi, Pingtung, and ends in Fangshan, Pingtung at the intersection of Provincial Highway 1.

== Sections ==
- Zhongshan Road & Roosevelt Road (Zhongzheng District - Wenshan District, Taipei)
- Bei-Yi Highway (Xindian District, New Taipei - Toucheng Township, Yilan)
- Suhua Highway (Su'ao Township, Yilan - Hualien City, Hualien)
- Huadong Highway (Hualien City, Hualien - Taitung City, Taitung)
- South Link Highway (Taitung City, Taitung - Fangshan Township, Pingtung)

== Branch Lines ==
- Provincial Highway 9A starts at its parent route in Xindian District, New Taipei and ends to Wulai District, New Taipei. The entire highway is known as Xinwu Road (新烏路). The total length is 19.964 km (12.405 mi). The route originally ended in Yilan City, but in 2014 the section from Wulai to Shuanglianpi was decommissioned altogether while the remainder from Shuanglianpi to Yilan was redesignated as Provincial Highway 7D.
- Provincial Highway 9B serves as a bypass route for its parent route between Beinan, Taitung and Taitung City, Taitung. The total length is 3.407 km (2.117 mi).
- Provincial Highway 9C starts at Hualien City, Hualien and ends at Shoufeng, Hualien. It was the original stretch of the parent highway between these two cities. The total length is 22.803 km (14.169 mi).
- Provincial Highway 9D starts at Su'ao and ends at Xiulin, Hualien. The total length is 69.074 km (42.921 mi).
- Provincial Highway 9E starts at Daren, Taitung and ends at Shizi, Pingtung. The total length is 16.151 km (10.036 mi).

== History ==
In August 2015, the 9A branch line of the highway passing through Wulai District, New Taipei City was cut by landslides due to Typhoon Soudelor.
