= Daren, Taitung =

Mountain indigenous township in Taitung County, Taiwan

Coordinates: 22°18′N 120°53′E

Daren Township 達仁鄉
- Mountain indigenous township
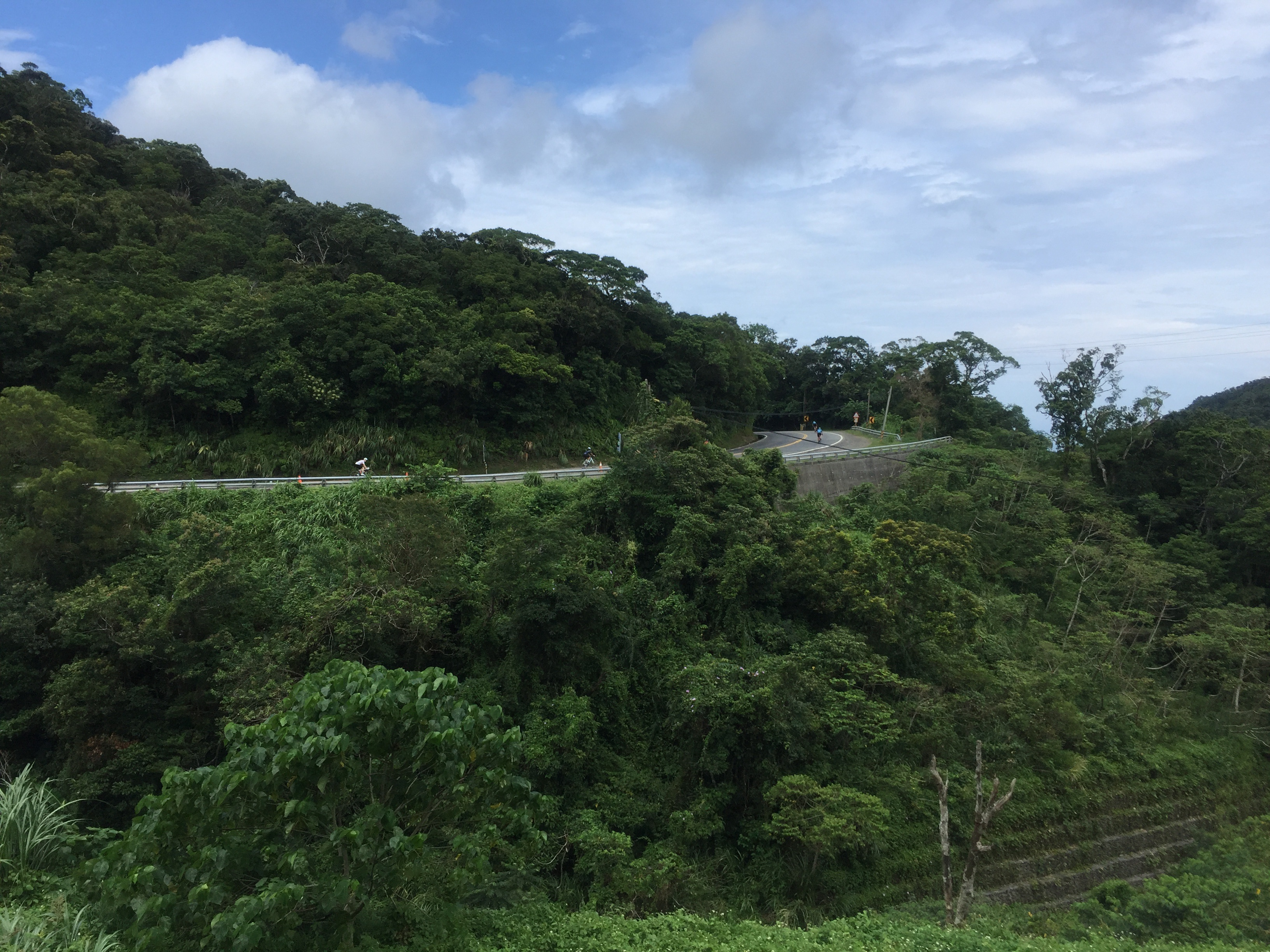
- View of the South-Link Highway

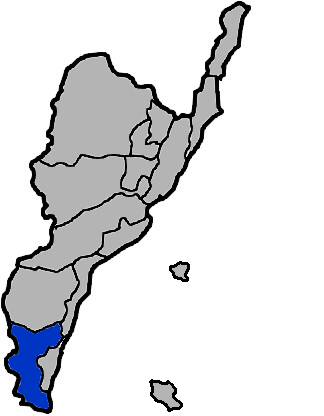
- Daren Township in Taitung County
- Location: Taitung County, Taiwan

Area
  - Total: 306 km^{2} (118 sq mi)

Population (September 2023)
  - Total: 3,419

Daren Township (Chinese: 達仁鄉; pinyin: Dárén Xiāng; Wade–Giles: Ta^{2}-jen^{2} Hsiang^{1}) is a mountain indigenous township in Taitung County, Taiwan. The main population is the Paiwan people of the Taiwanese aborigines.

== History ==
In 2012, Daren, along with Wuqiu Township in Kinmen County (Quemoy), was proposed by the Ministry of Economic Affairs as the candidate of the new disposal site of nuclear waste after the Lanyu Storage Site in Orchid Island, Taitung County. This proposal however received heavy objection from the local Wuqiu residents.

== Geography ==
- Area: 306.4454 km^{2}
- Population: 3,419 people (as of September 2023)

== Administrative divisions ==
The township comprises six villages: Anshuo, Nantan, Senyong, Sinhua, Taiban and Tuban.

== Tourist attractions ==
- Dawu Keteleeria Nature Preservation Area
- Jinshueiying National Trail
- Nantian Coast Water Park
- Tjuwabal Paiwan Culture and Art Community

== Transportation ==
The South-Link Highway passes through Daren Township, intersecting Highway 26 at Ansuo.
