= Results of the 2018 Taiwanese magistrate/mayor elections =

The 2018 Taiwanese municipal elections for both mayoral and magisterial candidates were held on 24 November 2018, as part of the larger local elections in Taiwan.

== 2018 municipal election candidate nominations ==
Nominations for 2018 municipal elections
Date	Party/wave	Nominations and details
24 September 2017	DPP	The Democratic Progressive Party (DPP) held its national congress, mainly to gain support in the upcoming local and municipal elections, giving the incumbent a priority to be nominated.
29 November 2017	DPP/01	Incumbents Lin Yu-chang (Keelung City); Cheng Wen-tsan (Taoyuan City); Lin Chih-chien (Hsinchu City); Lin Chia-lung (Taichung City); Wei Ming-ku (Changhua County); Lee Chin-yung (Yunlin County); Twu Shiing-jer (Chiayi City); Pan Men-an (Pingtung County); Chen Kuang-fu (Penghu County)
20 December 2017	KMT/01	Incumbents Hsu Yao-chang (Miaoli County); Lin Ming-chen (Nantou County); Liu Cheng-ying (Lienchiang County); Primary winner Wang Huei-mei (Changhua County)
27 December 2017	DPP/02	Hung Guo-haw (Nantou County); Liu Chao-hao (Taitung County)
31 January 2018	KMT/02	Primary winners Lin Zi-miao (Yilan County); Hsu Ming-tsai (Hsinchu City); Rao Ching-ling (Taitung County); Hsu Chen-wei (Hualien County); Chang Li-shan (Yunlin County)
7 February 2018	KMT/03	Hsieh Li-kung (Keelung City) after negotiation due to opinion poll error
21 February 2018	KMT/04	Lu Shiow-yen (Taichung City)
27 February 2018	KMT/05	Huang Min-hui (Chiayi City)
14 March 2018	DPP/03	Weng Chang-liang (Chiayi County); Chen Ou-po (Yilan County); Chen Chi-mai (Kaohsiung City); Huang Wei-cher (Tainan City)
21 March 2018	KMT/06	Lai Feng-wei (Penghu County)
11 April 2018	KMT/07	Apollo Chen (Taoyuan City); Hou You-yi (New Taipei City)
25 April 2018	KMT/08	Wu Yu-jen (Chiayi County); Su Ching-chuan (Pingtung County)
25 April 2018	DPP/04	Liuh Siao-mei (Hualien County); Cheng Chao-fang (Hsinchu County)
9 May 2018	KMT/09	Yang Cheng-wu (Kinmen County); Ting Shou-chung (Taipei City)
23 May 2018	KMT/10	Han Kuo-yu (Kaohsiung City); Kao Su-po (Tainan City)
30 May 2018	DPP/05	Pasuya Yao (Taipei City)
13 June 2018	KMT/11	Yang Wen-ke (Hsinchu County)

== Results summary ==
Bold represents incumbent re-elected.

Elected special municipalities mayors and county magistrates
County/City	Elected candidate	Party
Keelung City	**Lin Yu-chang**	DPP
New Taipei	Hou You-yi	KMT
Taipei	**Ko Wen-je**	Ind
Taoyuan	**Cheng Wen-tsan**	DPP
Hsinchu County	Yang Wen-ke	KMT
Hsinchu City	**Lin Chih-chien**	DPP
Miaoli	**Hsu Yao-chang**	KMT
Taichung	Lu Shiow-yen	KMT
Nantou	**Lin Ming-chen**	KMT
Changhua	Wang Huei-mei	KMT
Yunlin	Chang Li-shan	KMT
Chiayi	Weng Chang-liang	DPP
Chiayi City	Huang Min-hui	KMT
Tainan	Huang Wei-cher	DPP
Kaohsiung	Han Kuo-yu	KMT
Pingtung	**Pan Men-an**	DPP
Yilan	Lin Zi-miao	KMT
Hualien	Hsu Chen-wei	KMT
Taitung	Rao Ching-ling	KMT
Penghu	Lai Feng-wei	KMT
Kinmen	Yang Cheng-wu	KMT
Lienchiang	**Liu Cheng-ying**	KMT

Changes in seats
Party	Seats in 2018	Seats in 2014	Change
DPP	6	**13**	▼7
KMT	15	**6**	▲9
Ind/Other	1	**3**	▼2

Special municipalities/County/City re-elected incumbent
County/City	Previous control	New Control
Taipei	Ko Wen-je	Ind
Keelung City	Lin Yu-chang	DPP
Taoyuan	Cheng Wen-tsan	DPP
Hsinchu City	Lin Chih-chien	DPP
Miaoli	Hsu Yao-chang	KMT
Nantou	Lin Ming-chen	KMT
Pingtung	Pan Men-an	DPP
Lienchiang	Liu Cheng-ying	KMT

Special municipalities/County/City switching control
County/City	Previous control	New Control
Taichung	DPP	KMT
Kaohsiung	DPP	KMT
Changhua	DPP	KMT
Yunlin	DPP	KMT
Chiayi City	DPP	KMT
Yilan	DPP	KMT
Hualien	Ind	KMT
Penghu	DPP	KMT
Kinmen	Ind	KMT

== Special municipality ==
=== Taipei ===
Political context prior to the elections

As the capital of Taiwan, Taipei functions as the economic and political center of Taiwan, and is currently its largest city. Taipei's mayoral race has been hotly contested between Kuomintang and the Democratic Progressive Party since the 1994 local election. This seat has notably been held by former presidents Lee Teng-hui, Chen Shui-bian, and Ma Ying-jeou. The position has been widely speculated to be a "first-step" towards the presidential office.

In 2014 DPP-supported independent candidate Ko Wen-je received a 57% majority of the votes over Kuomintang's Sean Lien, ending the 16-year Kuomintang administration of Taipei.

Results of Past Taipei Municipal Mayoral Elections
Year	Winning Candidate	Political Party
1994	Chen Shui-bian	Democratic Progressive Party
1998	Ma Ying-jeou	Kuomintang
2002	Ma Ying-jeou	Kuomintang
2006	Hau Lung-pin	Kuomintang
2010	Hau Lung-pin	Kuomintang
2014	Ko Wen-je	Independent

Taipei City

Highest vote share
Party	Year	Vote share %
Democratic Progressive Party	2016 presidential election	52%
Kuomintang	2002 local elections	64%

2016 election results
Party	Presidential %	Legislative seats	Legislative %
Democratic Progressive Party	51.96%	2	14.14%
Kuomintang	37.49%	5	39.66%
New Power Party	-	1	6.60%
Taiwan Solidarity Union	-	0	0.95%
People First Party	10.55%	0	5.95%
Independent/Others	-	0	32.71%

Results of the primary

2018 Kuomintang Taipei City mayoral primary results
Candidates	Place	TVBS	Apollo Survey & Research	UDN	Aggregated Result
Ting Shou-chung	Nominated	48.395%	46.778%	47.741%	47.634%
Sun Ta-chien	2nd	17.891%	18.845%	17.878%	18.205%
Chang Hsien-yao	3rd	17.073%	17.909%	16.723%	17.235%
Chung Siao Ping	4th	16.651%	16.468%	17.658%	16.926%

2018 Democratic Progressive Party Taipei City mayoral primary results
Candidates	Place	Results
Pasuya Yao	Called in	Results not released
Annette Lu		Results not released

Opinion polls

Poll organization	Date of completion	Ko Wen-je	Ting Shou-chung	Pasuya Yao	Not sure	Lead
TVBS	May 4, 2017	40%	39%	9%	12%	1%
TVBS	May 4, 2017	46%	41%	–	13%	5%
Real Survey	May 23, 2017	39.9%	43.1%	－	17%	3.2%
TISR	June 21, 2017	43.3%	32.2%	–	24.5%	11.1%
Formosa	July 13, 2017	47.2%	31.3%	–	21.5%	15.9%
Sanli	July 17, 2017	32.1%	31.8%	15.7%	20.4%	0.3%
ETtoday	September 20, 2017	72.5%	17.5%	–	10%	55%
TCF	November 23, 2017	42.7%	36.9%	–	20.4%	5.8%
Formosa	December 12, 2017	46.0%	32.7%	–	21.3%	15.3%
Formosa	December 12, 2017	43.1%	28.2%	11.4%	17.3%	14.9%
TISR^{1}	December 14, 2017	36.6%	15.7%	6.8%	22%	20.9%
Real Survey	February 9, 2018	44.2%	26.6%	16.1%	13.1%	17.6%
Sanli	February 12, 2018	39.8%	30.3%	13.9%	16%	9.5%
Sanli	February 12, 2018	47.0%	39.1%	–	13.9%	7.9%
Focus Survey Research	February 25, 2018	47.6%	25.6%	15.2%	11.6%	22%
Focus Survey Research	February 25, 2018	54.7%	31.1%	–	14.2%	23.6%
ETtoday	February 26, 2018	44.0%	39.2%	–	16.8%	4.8%
GSSC	March 7, 2018	47.5%	40.7%	–	11.8%	6.8%
GSSC	March 7, 2018	42.4%	30.9%	13.5%	13.2%	11.5%
Evidence-Based Survey and Research	April 25, 2018	35.0%	25.6%	21.5%	17.9%	9.4%
Apollo	May 2, 2018	33.0%	33.6%	－	33.4%	0.6%
TVBS	May 2, 2018	31%	38%	－	31%	7%
Liberty Times Net	May 2, 2018	30.69%	37.47%	－	31.84%	6.78%
ETtoday	May 3, 2018	48.5%	32.1%	4.0%	15.4%	16.4%
DPP	May 3, 2018	35%	30%	25%	10%	5%
Green Party	May 3, 2018	31%	35%	25%	9%	4%
China Times	May 13, 2018	36.5%	42.7%	－	31%	6.2%
Formosa	May 14, 2018	41.0%	40.9%	－	18.1%	0.1%
Formosa	May 14, 2018	35.2%	33.1%	15.0%	16.7%	2.1%
ETtoday	May 17, 2018	36.4%	37.5%	13.4%	12.7%	1.1%
Liberty Times Net	May 21, 2018	39%	41%	-	19%	2%
Liberty Times Net	May 21, 2018	38%	39%	8%	16%	1%
Taiwan Brain Trust	May 22, 2018	41.3%	36.1%	－	22.6%	5.2%
Taiwan Brain Trust	May 22, 2018	39.4%	33.6%	13.8%	13.2%	5.8%
Hsih Shin University	May 28, 2018	29.0%	29.1%	13.5%	28.4%	0.1%
TVBS	June 1, 2018	31%	33%	13%	23%	2%
China Times	June 4, 2018	34.7%	40.2%	12.2%	12.9%	5.5%
CM Media	July 11, 2018	38.9%	27.5%	11.0%	22.6%	9.4%
Formosa^{2}	July 12, 2018	38.7%	30.5%	16.4%	6.2%	8.2%
Polls^{3}	July 16, 2018	43.4%	31.8%	8.9%	15.9%	11.6%
TVBS	July 24, 2018	40.0%	30.0%	11.0%	19.0%	10%
ETtoday	July 30, 2018	42.4%	30.9%	5.4%	21.3%	11.5%
Liberty Times Net^{4}	September 1, 2018	33.43%	24.71%	14.90%	26.96%	8.72%
ETtoday^{5}	September 9, 2018	41.7%	29.9%	8.4%	13.3%	11.8%
Shih Hsin University^{6}	September 12, 2018	34.9%	30.8%	10.4%	21.9%	4.1%
TVBS^{7}	September 16, 2018	37%	32%	11%	20%	5%
Formosa^{8}	September 18, 2018	34.6%	23.5%	11.1%	23.6%	11.1%
UDN^{9}	September 19, 2018	37%	29%	8%	25%	8%
Sanli^{10}	September 29, 2018	36.1%	25.8%	11.1%	25.2%	10.3%
Apollo	October 5, 2018	41.6%	27.2%	15.2%	16%	14.4%
Formosa^{11}	October 12, 2018	37.5%	25.0%	11.3%	14.7%	12.5%
Taiwan Public Opinion Foundation^{12}	October 16, 2018	42.1%	28.5%	11.6%	15.2%	13.6%
TVBS^{13}	October 25, 2018	40%	33%	12%	13%	7%
TVBS^{14}	October 25, 2018	34%	29%	11%	12%	5%
Taiwan Competitiveness Forum ^{15}	October 29, 2018	36.6%	34.3%	12.7%	15.7%	2.3%
UDN^{16}	October 30, 2018	38%	35%	8%	18%	3%
Democratic Progressive Party^{17}	October 31, 2018	35.9%	24.4%	19.7%	17.1%	11.5%
Shih Shin University^{18}	November 7, 2018	34.1%	31.4%	7.1%	25.9%	2.7%
Formosa^{19}	November 7, 2018	38.6%	27.1%	8.3%	18.0%	11.5%
ETtoday	November 8, 2018	38.4%	36.8%	7.6%	17.2%	1.6%
China Times	November 11, 2018	33.6%	32.8%	14.6%	17.1%	0.8%
TVBS	November 11, 2018	39%	36%	12%	13%	3%
Notes – results for independent candidates:^{1}： Lee Si-kuen（1.4%）^{2}： Lee Si-kuen（1.5%）^{3}： Lee Si-kuen（2.8%）^{4}： Lee Si-kuen（2.35%）^{5}： Lee Si-kuen（1.1%）^{6}： Lee Si-kuen（1.9%）； Wu E-yang（0.1%）^{7}： Lee Si-kuen（1%）； Wu E-yang（0.1%）^{8}： Lee Si-kuen（1.3%）； Wu E-yang（0.1%）^{9}： Lee Si-kuen（1%）； Wu E-yang（1%）^{10}： Lee Si-kuen（1.5%）； Wu E-yang（0.3%）^{11}： Lee Si-kuen（1.9%）； Wu E-yang（0.7%）^{12}： Lee Si-kuen（2.4%）； Wu E-yang（0.2%）^{13}： Lee Si-kuen（1.0%）； Wu E-yang（0.0%）^{14}： Lee Si-kuen（1.0%）； Wu E-yang（0.0%）^{15}： Lee Si-kuen（0.6%）； Wu E-yang（0.1%）^{16}： Lee Si-kuen（1.0%）； Wu E-yang（0.1%）^{17}： Lee Si-kuen（2.9%）^{18}： Lee Si-kuen（1.4%）； Wu E-yang（0.1%）^{19}： Lee Si-kuen（1.5%）； Wu E-yang（0.2%）

Predictions

Poll organization	Date of completion	Turnout	Ko Wen-je	Ting Shou-chung	Pasuya Yao	Lee Si-kuen
Formosa	September 20, 2018	>70%	47.4%-49.6%	30.7%-33.1%	16.9%-19.0%	1.3%-1.7%
TVBS	October 25, 2018	71%	44%	40%	15%	-
Formosa	November 7, 2018	>70%	49.1% ~ 52.7%	30.2% ~ 34.4%	14.1% ~ 16.1%	-
TVBS	November 11, 2018	73%	46%	40%	13%	-

Results
According to Civil Servants Election And Recall Act article 69, because Independent Ko Wen-je and Kuomintang's Ting Shou-chung vote percentages are within 0.30 margin, Kuomintang's Ting Shou-chung was entitled to, and did, call for a recount.

Ko lead > 1,300 Ko lead > 300 Ko lead < 300 Ting lead < 300 Ting lead > 300 Ting lead > 1,300

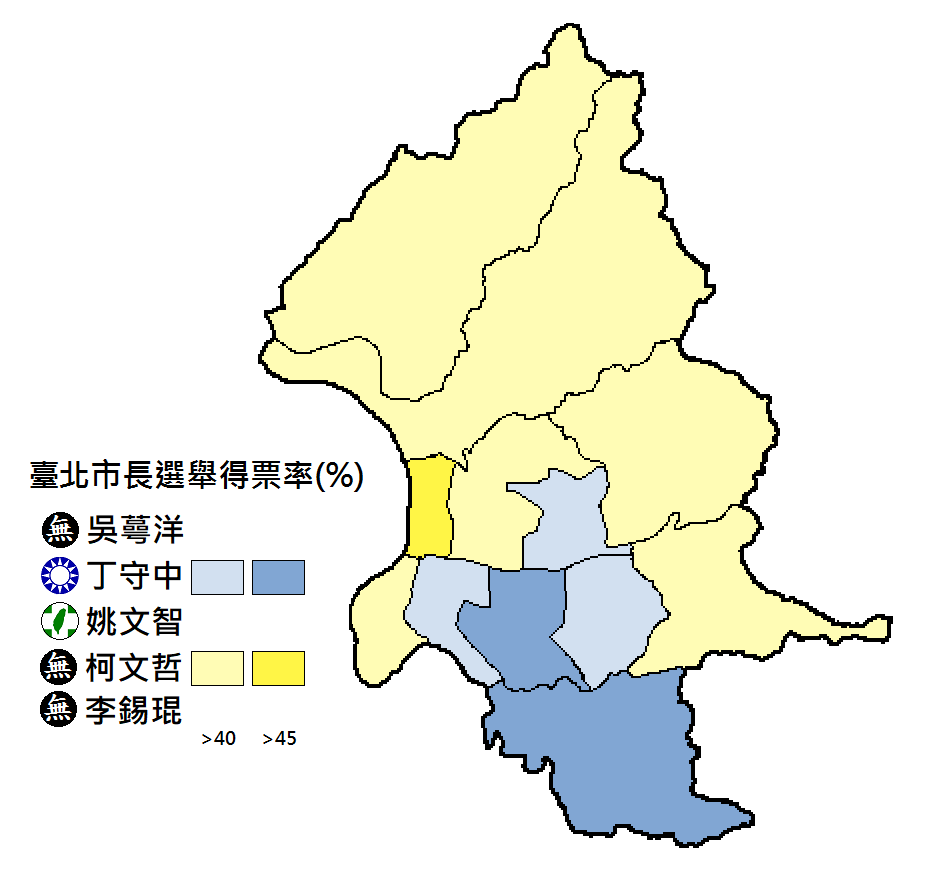

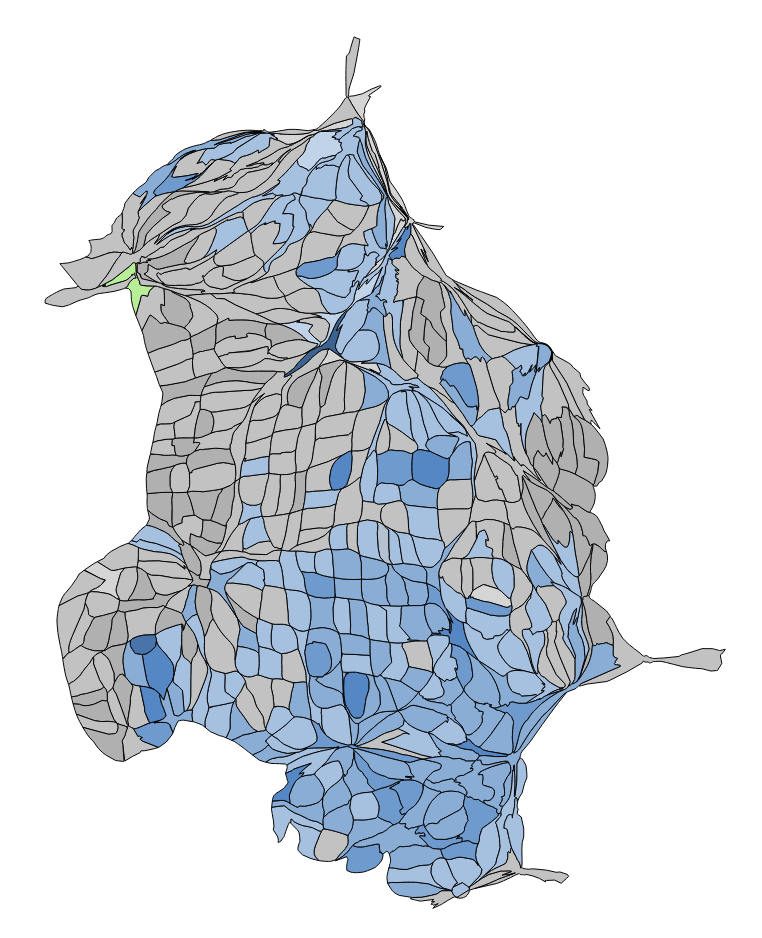

District	Wu E-yang		Ting Shou-chung		Pasuya Yao		Ko Wen-je		Lee Si-kuen	
District	Votes	%	Votes	%	Votes	%	Votes	%	Votes	%
Songshan District (松山區)	428	0.40	46,381	43.36	17,387	16.25	42,356	39.60	420	0.39
Xinyi District (信義區)	502	0.41	53,955	43.99	19,934	16.25	47,762	38.94	512	0.42
Daan District (大安區)	585	0.37	72,325	45.73	23,651	14.95	60,939	38.53	662	0.42
Zhongshan District (中山區)	476	0.39	46,746	38.38	23,483	19.28	50,604	41.55	491	0.40
Zhongzheng District (中正區)	370	0.46	33,897	41.83	12,633	15.59	33,752	41.65	378	0.47
Datong District (大同區)	266	0.38	20,763	29.69	16,896	24.16	31,679	45.29	339	0.48
Wanhua District (萬華區)	427	0.41	38,666	37.05	21,400	20.50	43,411	41.59	464	0.44
Wenshan District (文山區)	707	0.49	68,586	47.15	18,985	13.05	56,479	38.83	713	0.49
Nangang District (南港區)	287	0.43	26,282	39.45	10,830	16.26	28,896	43.37	325	0.49
Neihu District (内湖區)	548	0.37	61,566	41.02	21,746	14.49	65,599	43.70	639	0.43
Shilin District (士林區)	522	0.34	55,954	36.46	33,110	21.57	63,247	41.21	651	0.42
Beitou District (北投區)	499	0.37	52,445	39.08	24,586	18.32	56,096	41.80	578	0.43

2018 Taipei City mayoral results
No.	Candidate	Party	Votes	Percentage
1	Wu E-yang (吳蕚洋)	Independent	5,617	0.40%
2	Ting Shou-chung (丁守中)	Kuomintang	577,566	40.82%
3	Pasuya Yao (姚文智)	Democratic Progressive Party	244,641	17.29%
4	Ko Wen-je (柯文哲)	Independent	580,820	41.05%
5	Lee Si-kuen (李錫錕)	Independent	6,172	0.44%
Total voters			2,164,155	
Valid votes			1,414,816	
Invalid votes				
Voter turnout			65.37%	

=== New Taipei ===
Political context prior to the elections

New Taipei City is located in the northernmost region of Taiwan and is the ROC's most populous city. New Taipei was upgraded to Special Municipality status in 2010. Due to the vast territory, the number of voters has surpassed 3 million, becoming a Pan blue coalition and Pan green coalition camps battleground.

Before upgrading to special municipality status, the then Taipei County was controlled by the Kuomintang until the 1989 local election, with the then newly formed Democratic Progressive Party winning the seat for four straight terms in 16 years until Kuomintang's Chou Hsi-wei won power in 2005.

After the upgrade to special municipality status in 2010, Kuomintang's Eric Chu won the seat for two consecutive terms, including the 2014 local election.

Results of Past Taipei County Magistrate & New Taipei Municipal Mayoral Elections
Year	Winning Candidate	Political Party
1989	You Ching	Democratic Progressive Party
1993	You Ching	Democratic Progressive Party
1997	Su Tseng-chang	Democratic Progressive Party
2001	Su Tseng-chang	Democratic Progressive Party
2005	Chou Hsi-wei	Kuomintang
2010	Eric Chu	Kuomintang
2014	Eric Chu	Kuomintang

New Taipei City

Highest vote share
Party	Year	Vote share %
Democratic Progressive Party	2016 presidential election	55%
Kuomintang	2008 presidential election	61%

2016 election results
Party	Presidential %	Legislative seats	Legislative %
Democratic Progressive Party	54.79%	9	46.74%
Kuomintang	33.34%	2	40.12%
New Power Party	-	1	4.13%
Taiwan Solidarity Union	-	0	-
People First Party	11.87%	0	0.84%
Independent/Others	-	0	8.17%

Results of the primary

2018 Kuomintang New Taipei City mayoral primary results
Candidates	Place	Results
Hou You-yi	Nominated	55.596%
Chou Hsi-wei	2nd	34.210%
Jin Jie-shou	3rd	10.194%

2018 Democratic Progressive Party New Taipei City mayoral primary results
Candidates	Place	Result
Su Tseng-chang	Called In	Walkover

Opinion polls

Poll organization	Date of completion	Su Tseng-chang	Hou You-yi	Undecided	Lead
TVBS	December 6, 2017	39.0%	48.0%	13.0%	9%
Formosa	January 12, 2018	41.7%	41.5%	17.8%	0.2%
China Times	February 26, 2018	33.6%	53.8%	12.6%	20.6%
ETtoday	March 1, 2018	27.4%	51.4%	21.2%	24%
DPP	March 24, 2018	39.0%	39.1%	21.9%	0.1%
Apollo	April 1, 2018	26.4%	54.3%	19.3%	26.9%
Apple Daily	April 7, 2018	27.54%	61.37%	11.09%	33.83%
Taiwan Nextgen Foundation	April 11, 2018	42.6%	41.7%	15.7%	0.9%
ETtoday	April 11, 2018	22.7%	46.4%	30.9%	23.9%
TVBS	April 12, 2018	32.0%	40.0%	28.0%	8%
UDN	May 1, 2018	26.0%	45.0%	29.0%	19%
China Times	May 1, 2018	27.1%	50.6%	22.3%	23.5%
Taiwan Brain Trust	May 22, 2018	30.7%	44.3%	25%	13.6%
Formosa	June 15, 2018	23.6%	41.7%	34.7%	18.1%
TVBS	June 25, 2018	31.0%	48.0%	21.0%	17%
Taiwan Nextgen Foundation	June 29, 2018	38.3%	41.0%	20.7%	2.7%
TVBS	July 17, 2018	29.0%	48.0%	23.0%	19%
CM Media	July 26, 2018	31.1%	46.3%	22.6%	15.2%
Taiwan Brain Trust	July 27, 2018	40.6%	42.6%	16.8%	2%
ETtoday	August 10, 2018	24.2%	45.2%	30.6%	11%
Taiwan Think Tank	August 31, 2018	43.2%	43.9%	12.9%	0.7%
Liberty Times Net	September 7, 2018	30.89%	39.86%	29.25%	8.97%
Shih Hsin University	September 14, 2018	29.4%	40.2%	30.4%	10.8%
Formosa	September 14, 2018	28.2%	41.7%	18.1%	13.5%
TVBS	September 16, 2018	32%	48%	20%	16%
UDN	September 17, 2018	24%	48%	28%	24%
Taiwan Think Tank	September 22, 2018	40.9%	44.3%	14.8%	4.6%
Apollo	October 7, 2018	32.8%	49.4%	15.6%	16.6%
DPP	October 14, 2018	39.1%	39.3%	21.6%	0.2%
Apollo	October 16, 2018	31%	49.1%	19%	18.1%
TVBS	October 18, 2018	30%	50%	21%	20%
Formosa	October 26, 2018	22.5%	44.4%	19%	21.9%
UDN	November 2, 2018	26%	54%	20%	29%
Sanli	November 3, 2018	39.2%	40.2%	20.6%	1%
Shih Shin University	November 8, 2018	30.7%	36.4%	32.9%	5.7%
ETtoday	November 8, 2018	34%	39.9%	26.1%	5.9%
Sanli	November 12, 2018	43.7%	44%	12.3%	0.3%
TVBS	November 12, 2018	34%	48%	18%	14%

Predictions

Poll organization	Date of completion	Turnout	Hou You-yi	Su Tseng-chang
Formosa	September 20, 2018		51.5% ~ 53%	47% ~ 48.5%
TVBS	October 19, 2018	62%	56%	44%
TVBS	November 12, 2018	70%	55%	45%

Results

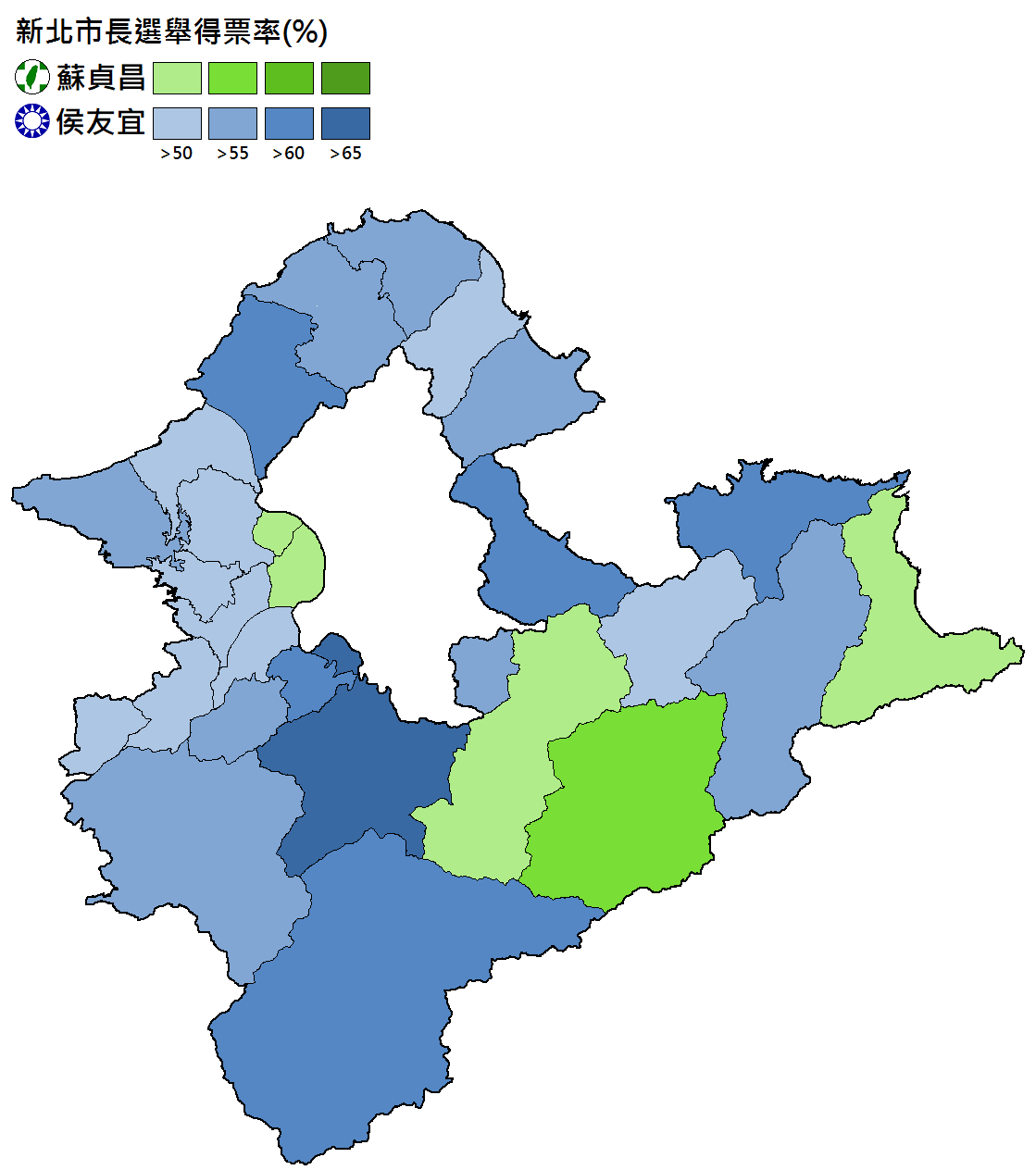

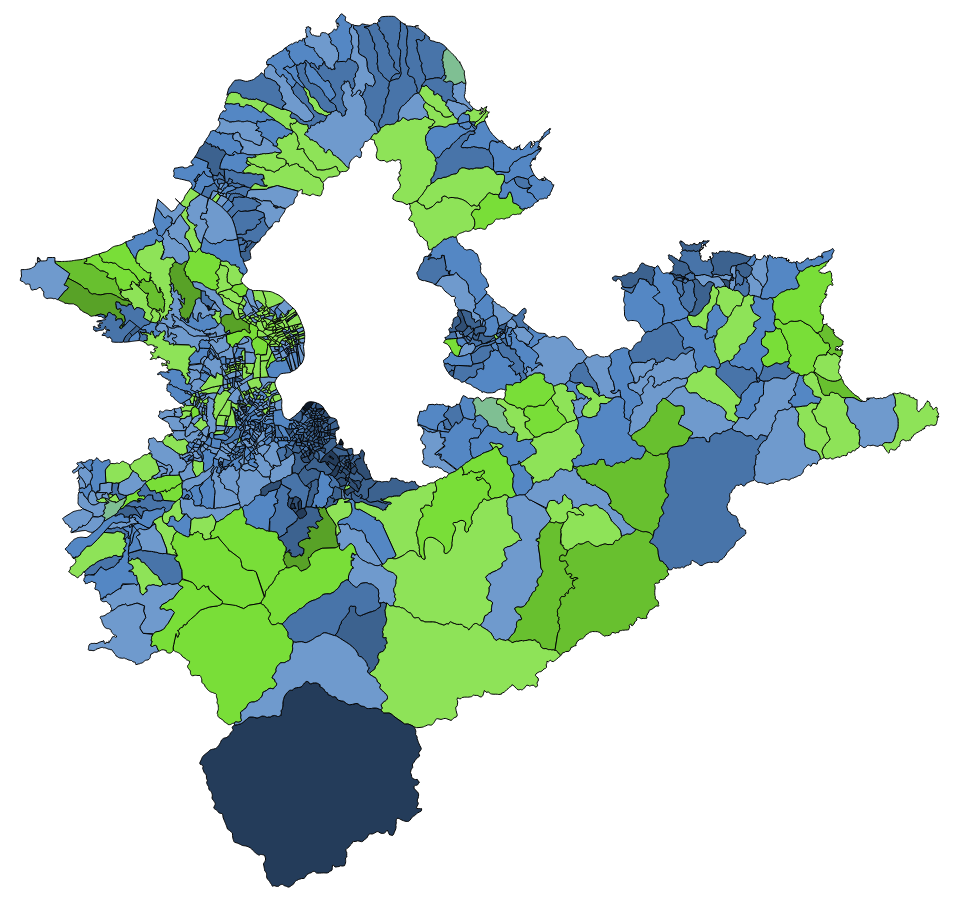

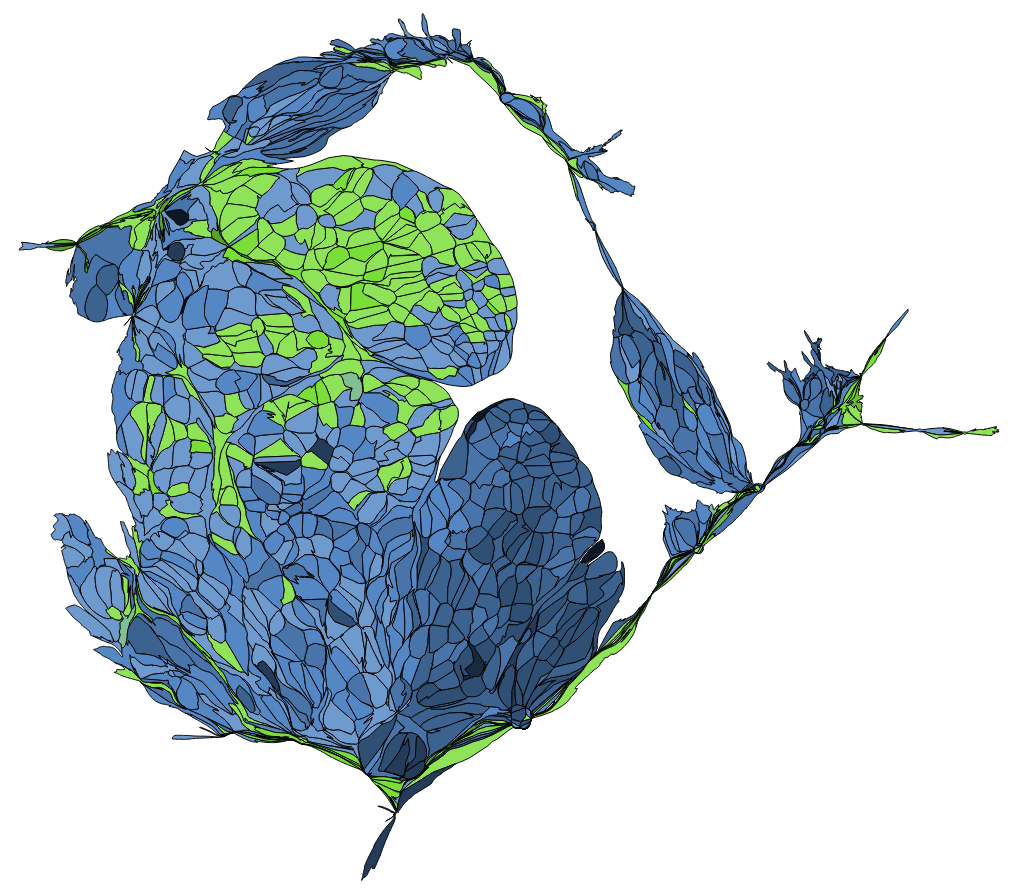

District	Su Tseng-chang		Hou You-yi	
District	Votes	%	Votes	%
Banqiao District (板橋區)	131,905	46.03	154,687	53.97
Sanchong District (三重區)	100,823	50.22	99,925	49.78
Zhonghe District (中和區)	80,552	36.69	139,022	63.31
Yonghe District (永和區)	38,286	32.54	79,362	67.46
Xingzhuang District (新莊區)	101,046	48.28	108,240	51.72
Xindian District (新店區)	49,933	31.27	109,759	68.73
Shulin District (樹林區)	41,600	45.87	49,090	54.13
Yingge District (鶯歌區)	20,360	46.51	23,419	53.49
Sanxia District (三峽區)	23,653	42.64	31,822	57.36
Danshui District (淡水區)	33,763	39.67	51,336	60.33
Xizhi District (汐止區)	38,639	38.72	61,139	61.28
Ruifang District (瑞芳區)	8,038	37.51	13,393	62.49
Tucheng District (土城區)	51,932	43.85	66,487	56.15
Luzhou District (蘆洲區)	48,350	50.56	47,271	49.44
Wugu District (五股區)	20,372	47.77	22,276	52.23
Taishan District (泰山區)	17,627	45.77	20,885	54.23
Linkou District (林口區)	20,883	40.92	30,150	59.08
Shenkeng District (深坑區)	5,153	40.03	7,720	59.97
Shiding District (石碇區)	2,488	52.27	2,272	47.73
Pinglin District (坪林區)	2,255	55.46	1,811	44.54
Sanzhi District (三芝區)	4,915	40.60	7,191	59.40
Shimen District (石門區)	2,928	41.30	4,162	58.70
Bali District (八里區)	8,982	46.00	10,545	54.00
Pingxi District (平溪區)	1,417	46.72	1,616	53.28
Shuangxi District (雙溪區)	2,423	44.18	3,062	55.82
Gongliao District (貢寮區)	3,698	54.21	3,123	45.79
Jinshan District (金山區)	5,344	46.11	6,246	53.89
Wanli District (萬里區)	4,928	42.95	6,547	57.05
Wulai District (烏來區)	1,399	35.23	2,572	64.77

2018 New Taipei City mayoral results
No.	Candidate	Party	Votes	Percentage
1	Su Tseng-chang (蘇貞昌)	Democratic Progressive Party	873,692	42.85%
2	Hou You-yi (侯友宜)	Kuomintang	1,165,130	57.15%
Total voters			3,264,128	
Valid votes			2,038,822	
Invalid votes			50,305	
Voter turnout			62.46%	

=== Taoyuan ===
Political context prior to the elections

In late 2014, Taoyuan City was upgraded to special municipality status from Taoyuan County. Taoyuan is known for its diversity, mostly migrants from South East Asia region. Before the 1990s, Taoyuan County has been long held by Kuomintang except 1977-1979, 1997-2001 and 2014 until present.

In the 1997 by-election, the Democratic Progressive Party nominated Annette Lu, winning the seat over the Kuomintang and subsequently won it until the 2001 local election.

In 2001 local election, Kuomintang won the seat back from the DPP for three straight terms in 13 years until 2014 local election, losing to the Democratic Progressive Party-nominated candidate Cheng Wen-tsan by 30,000 votes.

Results of Past Taoyuan County Magistrate & Taoyuan Municipal Mayoral Elections
Year	Winning Candidate	Political Party
1997	Annette Lu	Democratic Progressive Party
2001	Eric Chu	Kuomintang
2005	Eric Chu	Kuomintang
2010	John Wu	Kuomintang
2014	Cheng Wen-tsan	Democratic Progressive Party

Taoyuan City

Highest vote share
Party	Year	Vote share %
Democratic Progressive Party	1997 local election	56%
Kuomintang	2008 presidential election	65%

2016 election results
Party	Presidential %	Legislative seats	Legislative %
Democratic Progressive Party	51.03%	3	39.48%
Kuomintang	34.39%	2	45.20%
New Power Party	-	0	0.78%
Taiwan Solidarity Union	-	0	-
People First Party	14.59%	0	-
Independent/Others	-	1	14.54%

Results of the primary

2018 Democratic Progressive Party Taichung City mayoral primary results
Candidates	Place	Result
Cheng Wen-tsan	Nominated	Walkover

2018 Kuomintang Taoyuan City mayoral primary results
Candidates	Place	Results
Apollo Chen	Nominated	35.689%
Lu Ming-zhe	2nd	33.067%
Yang Li-huan	3rd	31.245%

Opinion polls

Poll organization	Date of completion	Cheng Wen-tsan	Apollo Chen	Yang Li-huan	Not sure	Lead
TVBS	June 24, 2017	61%	21%	-	18%	40%
Yam News	October 24, 2017	48.82%	51.18%	-	0%	2.36%
GSSC	November 1, 2017	54.3%	25.1%	-	20.6%	29.2%
TISR	December 13, 2017	53.6%	20.2%	-	26.2%	33.4%
ETtoday	April 2, 2018	46.7%	31.7%	-	21.6%	15%
Taiwan Brain Trust	May 22, 2018	61.4%	17.8%	-	20.8%	43.6%
China Times	June 12, 2018	51.5%	24.9%	-	21.5%	26.6%
I'm Taiwanese	June 23, 2018	59.3%	29.6%	-	11.1%	29.7%
TVBS	July 20, 2018	56%	20%	-	24%	36%
Liberty Times Net	August 10, 2018	56.2%	16.0%	-	27.8%	40.2%
ETtoday^{1}	August 20, 2018	50.7%	23.8%	–	25.5%	26.9%
TVBS^{2}	September 16, 2018	56%	17%	6%	25.5%	39%
Shih Hsin University^{3}	September 4, 2018	42.3%	18.5%	5.4%	33.7%	23.8%
UDN^{4}	September 25, 2018	51%	16%	6%	26%	35%
Shih Hsin University^{5}	November 20, 2018	36.9%	26.8%	2.4%	32.9%	10.1%
Sanli^{6}	November 7, 2018	58.1%	16.9%	4.5%	18.0%	41.2%
ETtoday	November 8, 2018	45.9%	27.6%	-%	26.5%	18.3%
Note：* Opinion polls includes independent candidates.^{1}： Chu Mei-sheue（1.9%）^{2}： Chu Mei-sheue（0.1%）； Wu Fu-tun（0%）^{3}： Chu Mei-sheue（0.0%）； Wu Fu-tun（0.1%）^{4}： Chu Mei-sheue（0.3%）； Wu Fu-tun（0.1%）^{5}： Chu Mei-sheue（0.9%）； Wu Fu-tun（0.1%）^{6}： Chu Mei-sheue（2.4%）； Wu Fu-tun（0.1%）

Results

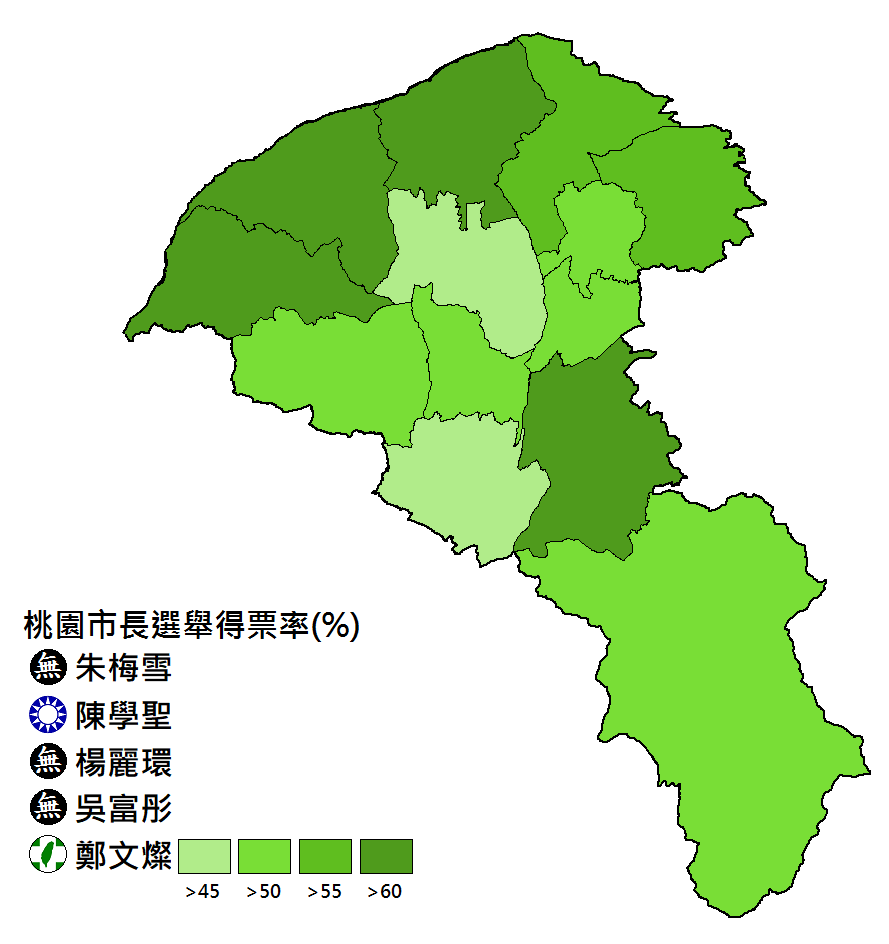

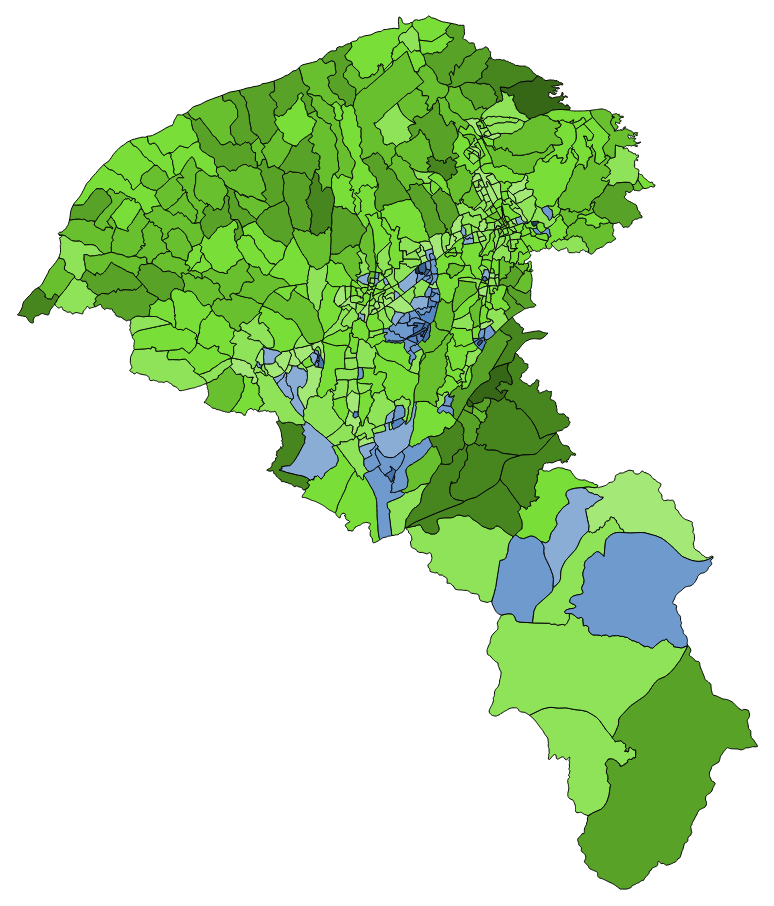
2018 桃園市市長選舉各里得票

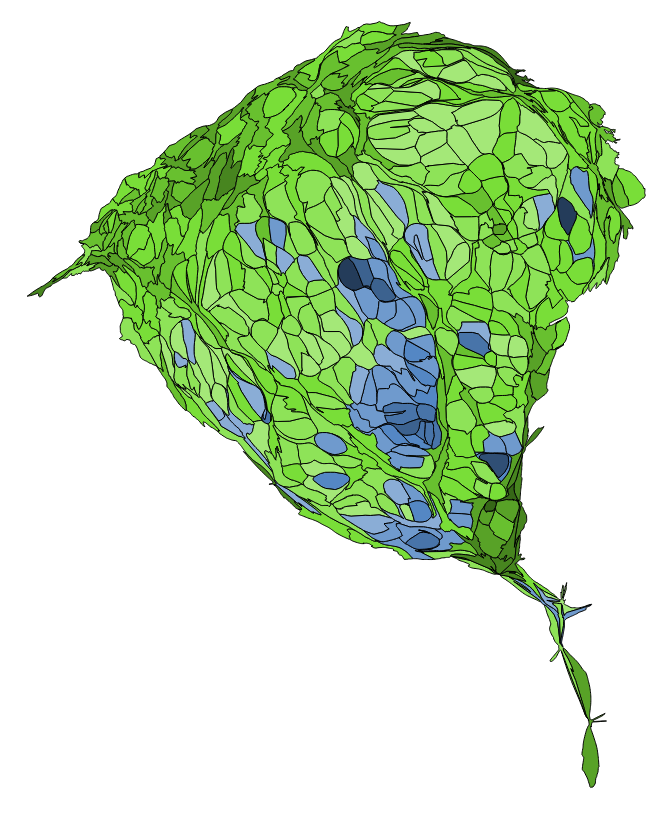
2018 桃園市市長選舉各里得票人口變形圖

District	Chu Mei-sheue		Apollo Chen		Yang Li-huan		Wu Fu-tun		Cheng Wen-tsan	
District	Votes	%	Votes	%	Votes	%	Votes	%	Votes	%
Taoyuan District (桃園區)	4,084	2.10	73,799	37.98	14,752	7.59	424	0.22	101,241	52.11
Zhongli District (中壢區)	3,250	1.68	88,154	45.69	6,829	3.54	561	0.29	94,164	48.80
Daxi District (大溪區)	610	1.28	16,271	34.10	1,897	3.98	190	0.40	28,746	60.25
Yangmei District (楊梅區)	1,204	1.55	32,538	41.85	3,387	4.36	348	0.45	40,272	51.80
Luzhu District (蘆竹區)	1,610	2.23	24,164	33.50	4,197	5.82	214	0.30	41,938	58.15
Dayuan District (大園區)	795	1.77	13,865	30.80	2,508	5.57	201	0.45	27,652	61.42
Guishan District (龜山區)	1,372	1.89	26,791	36.96	4,071	5.62	256	0.35	39,998	55.18
Bade District (八德區)	1,633	1.74	36,314	38.61	4,174	4.44	273	0.29	51,667	54.93
Longtan District (龍潭區)	979	1.64	27,385	45.77	2,296	3.84	568	0.95	28,610	47.81
Pingzhen District (平鎮區)	1,694	1.58	45,697	42.62	3,846	3.59	483	0.45	55,507	51.77
Xinwu District (新屋區)	370	1.29	9,164	31.94	1,434	5.00	141	0.49	17,581	61.28
Guanyin District (觀音區)	556	1.64	10,126	29.80	1,833	5.39	176	0.52	21,285	62.65
Fuxing District (復興區)	43	0.61	2,966	42.35	294	4.20	32	0.46	3,669	52.38

2018 Taoyuan City mayoral results
No.	Candidate	Party	Votes	Percentage
1	Chu Mei-sheue (朱梅雪)	Independent	18,200	1.76%
2	Apollo Chen (陳學聖)	Kuomintang	407,234	39.42%
3	Yang Li-huan (楊麗環)	Independent	51,518	4.99%
4	Wu Fu-tun (吳富彤)	Independent	3,867	0.37%
5	Cheng Wen-tsan (鄭文燦)	Democratic Progressive Party	552,330	53.46%
Total voters			1,732,591	
Valid votes			1,033,149	
Invalid votes				
Voter turnout			59.63%	

=== Taichung ===
Political context prior to the elections

Results of Past Taichung County Magistrate Elections
Year	Winning Candidate	Political Party
1989	Liao Liou-yi	Kuomintang
1993	Liao Liou-yi	Kuomintang
1997	Liao Yung-lai	Democratic Progressive Party
2001	Huang Chung-sheng	Kuomintang
2005	Huang Chung-sheng	Kuomintang

Results of Past Taichung City Mayoral Elections
Year	Winning Candidate	Political Party
1989	Lin Po-jung	Kuomintang
1993	Lin Po-jung	Kuomintang
1997	Chang Wen-ying	Democratic Progressive Party
2001	Jason Hu Chih-chiang	Kuomintang
2005	Jason Hu Chih-chiang	Kuomintang
2010	Jason Hu Chih-chiang	Kuomintang
2014	Lin Chia-lung	Democratic Progressive Party

Taichung City is the second largest metropolis in Taiwan, serves as the economic, cultural and transportation hub in the central part of Taiwan. It was merged and reorganized at the end of 2010 by Taichung County and Taichung City forming Taichung City. The former Taichung County was controlled by the Kuomintang except in 1997, the Democratic Progressive Party's Liao Yung-lai was elected as the county mayor.

Taichung City before in the 1980s are held by Independent or Kuomintang's Zhang and Lai factions. In the 1980s, the Kuomintang changed its nomination strategy to regain its power, by choosing non-faction candidates defeated Tzeng Wen-po (曾文坡), who is seeking for re-election in 1981, starting a four straight terms in 16 years. In 1997, the Democratic Progressive Party's Chang Wen-ying was elected for Taichung City mayor due to the Pan blue coalition split.

In 2001, Kuomintang's Jason Hu was elected as Taichung City mayor until 2010's merger and won the third term as the first mayor of the newly formed Taichung City with 36,351 votes. In 2014, Democratic Progressive Party's candidate Lin Chia-lung won 57% of the votes, elected as the Taichung City mayor due to unhappiness towards the Kuomintang government.

Taichung City

Highest vote share
Party	Year	Vote share %
Democratic Progressive Party	2014 local election	57%
Kuomintang	2008 presidential election	60%

2016 election results
Party	Presidential %	Legislative seats	Legislative %
Democratic Progressive Party	55.01%	4	39.26%
Kuomintang	29.82%	3	43.03%
New Power Party	-	1	6.58%
Taiwan Solidarity Union	-	0	5.92%
People First Party	15.1731%	0	-
Independent	-	0	5.21%

Results of the primary

2018 Democratic Progressive Party Taichung City mayoral primary results
Candidates	Place	Result
Lin Chia-lung	Nominated	Walkover

2018 Kuomintang Taichung City mayoral primary results
Candidates	Place	Results
Lu Shiow-yen	Nominated	50.308%
Johnny Chiang	2nd	49.692%

Opinion polls

Poll organization	Dates conducted	Lin Chia-lung	Lu Shiow-yen	Not sure	Lead
TISR	July 20, 2017	40.1%	28.8%	31.1%	11.3%
Apollo	August 3, 2017	44.2%	32.2%	23.4%	12%
TVBS	August 29, 2017	52%	32.0%	16.0%	20%
Sanli	September 5, 2017	49.5%	23.8%	26.7%	15.7%
China Times	November 1, 2017	44.4%	29.3%	26.3%	15.1%
ETtoday	November 3, 2017	37.0%	34.1%	28.9%	2.9%
Formosa	November 7, 2017	37.4%	33.1%	29.5%	4.3%
GSSC	November 28, 2017	52.1%	28.0%	19.9%	24.1%
Sanli	December 6, 2017	47.7%	25.3%	27.0%	22.4%
TISR	December 6, 2017	40.1%	17.2%	42.7%	22.9%
Era Com	December 28, 2017	36.1%	35.1%	28.8%	1%
Formosa	February 9, 2018	35.8%	37.6%	26.6%	1.8%
China Times	February 12, 2018	36.4%	30.6%	33.0%	5.8%
ETtoday	March 5, 2018	32.6%	32.0%	35.4%	0.6%
ETtoday	March 14, 2018	47.1%	33.7%	19.2%	13.4%
TISR	April 21, 2018	31.9%	23.7%	44.4%	8.2%
Apollo	May 3, 2018	33.0%	35.7%	31.3%	2.7%
Taiwan Brain Trust	May 22, 2018	43.0%	32.2%	24.8%	10.8%
UDN	May 28, 2018	32.0%	39.0%	29.0%	7%
Kuomintang	May 28, 2018	33.0%	39.7%	27.3%	6.7%
TVBS	July 20, 2018	33.0%	39.0%	28.0%	6%
Taiwan Brain Trust	July 31, 2018	37.8%	35.6%	26.6%	2.2%
CM Media	July 31, 2018	43.9%	31.1%	25.0%	12.8%
Cross Strait Association	July 31, 2018	43.2%	24.4%	32.4%	18.8%
Taiwan Competitiveness Forum	August 10, 2018	35.8%	38.0%	28.0%	2.2%
ETtoday	August 14, 2018	31.0%	35.6%	23.7%	4.6%
Liberty News Net	August 24, 2018	38.52%	32.41%	29.07%	6.11%
Taiwan Brain Trust	August 27, 2018	42%	33.5%	24.5%	8.5%
UDN	September 13, 2018	33%	34%	32%	1%
TISR	September 15, 2018	26.8%	28.6%	32.8%	1.8%
Shih Shin University^{3}	September 15, 2018	30.3%	30.9%	38.7%	0.6%
TVBS^{4}	September 16, 2018	35%	38%	27%	3%
China Times^{5}	September 26, 2018	38.1%	40.2%	15.9%	2.1%
Kuomintang	September 30, 2018	33.6%	40.1%	24.6%	6.5%
CM Media^{6}	October 4, 2018	40%	34.6%	22.3%	5.4%
Taiwan Next Gen Foundation	October 14, 2018	41.4%	31.1%	27.5%	10.3%
Formosa^{7}	October 17, 2018	25.6%	31%	29.3%	5.4%
TVBS^{8}	October 22, 2018	36%	44%	19%	8%
Taiwan Competitiveness Forum^{9}	October 27, 2018	27.1%	34.4%	30.3%	7.3%
Formosa^{10}	November 1, 2018	28.7%	35.7%	21.7%	7%
CM Media^{10}	November 3, 2018	39.2%	33.4%	23%	5.8%
ETtoday^{12}	November 4, 2018	31.8%	42.6%	19.6%	10.8%
UDN^{13}	November 5, 2018	30%	43%	25%	13%
Sanli^{14}	November 6, 2018	45.1%	34%	18.3%	11.1%
ETtoday	November 8, 2018	31.7%	45.4%	22.9%	13.7%
Shih Shin University^{15}	November 10, 2018	32.0%	34.4%	32.8%	2.4%
Taiwan Next Gen Foundation	November 11, 2018	41.4%	35.6%	23%	5.8%
TVBS^{16}	November 12, 2018	39%	41%	19%	2%
Note：* Opinion polls includes independent candidates.^{1}： Sung Antony（0.1%）^{2}： Sung Antony（2.3%）^{3}： Sung Antony（1.1%）^{4}： Sung Antony（3%）^{5}： Sung Antony（4.6%）^{6}： Sung Antony（1.6%）^{7}： Sung Antony（3.3%）^{8}： Sung Antony（1.0%）^{9}： Sung Antony（2.4%）^{10}： Sung Antony（2.4%）^{11}： Sung Antony（2.7%）^{12}： Sung Antony（1.4%）^{13}： Sung Antony（2.0%）^{14}： Sung Antony（2.5%）^{15}： Sung Antony（0.8%）^{16}： Sung Antony（1.0%） _{a}：Negative Vote Association

Predictions

Poll organization	Date of completion	Turnout	Lu Shiow-yen	Lin Chia-lung	Sung Antony
TVBS	October 22, 2018	71%	50%	49%	1%
Formosa	October 26, 2018	83.9%	49% ~ 51.4%	45% ~ 47.2%	2.9% ~ 4.3%

Results

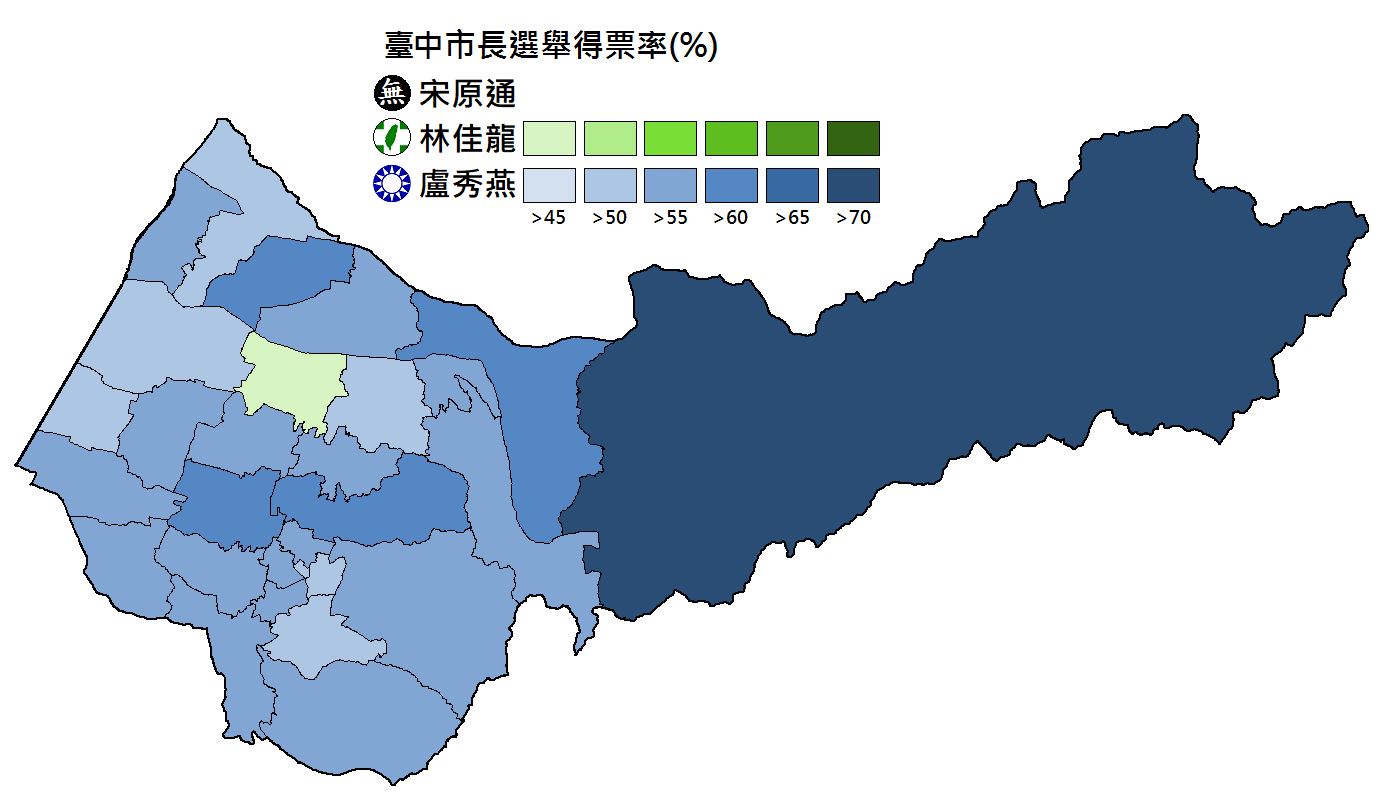

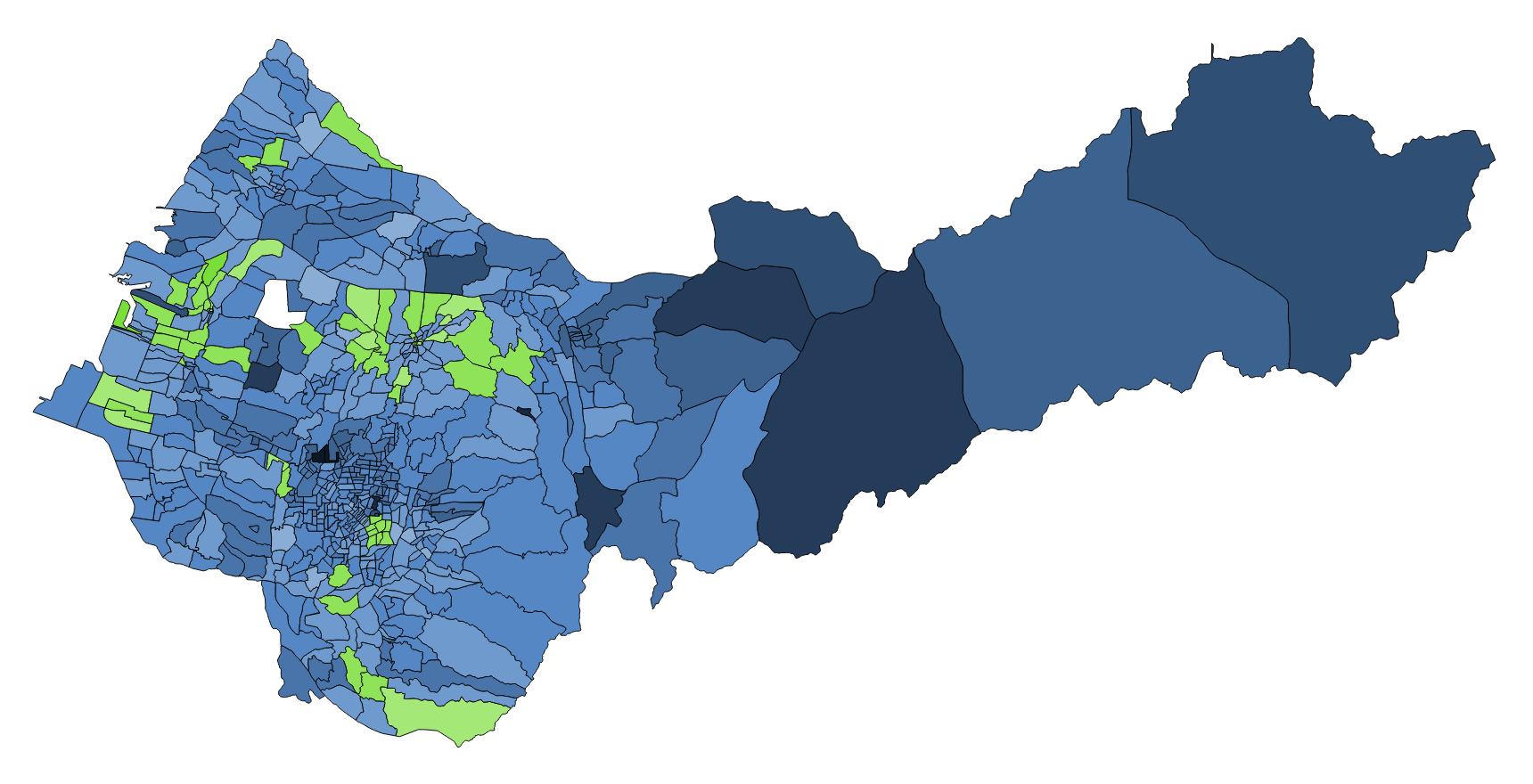

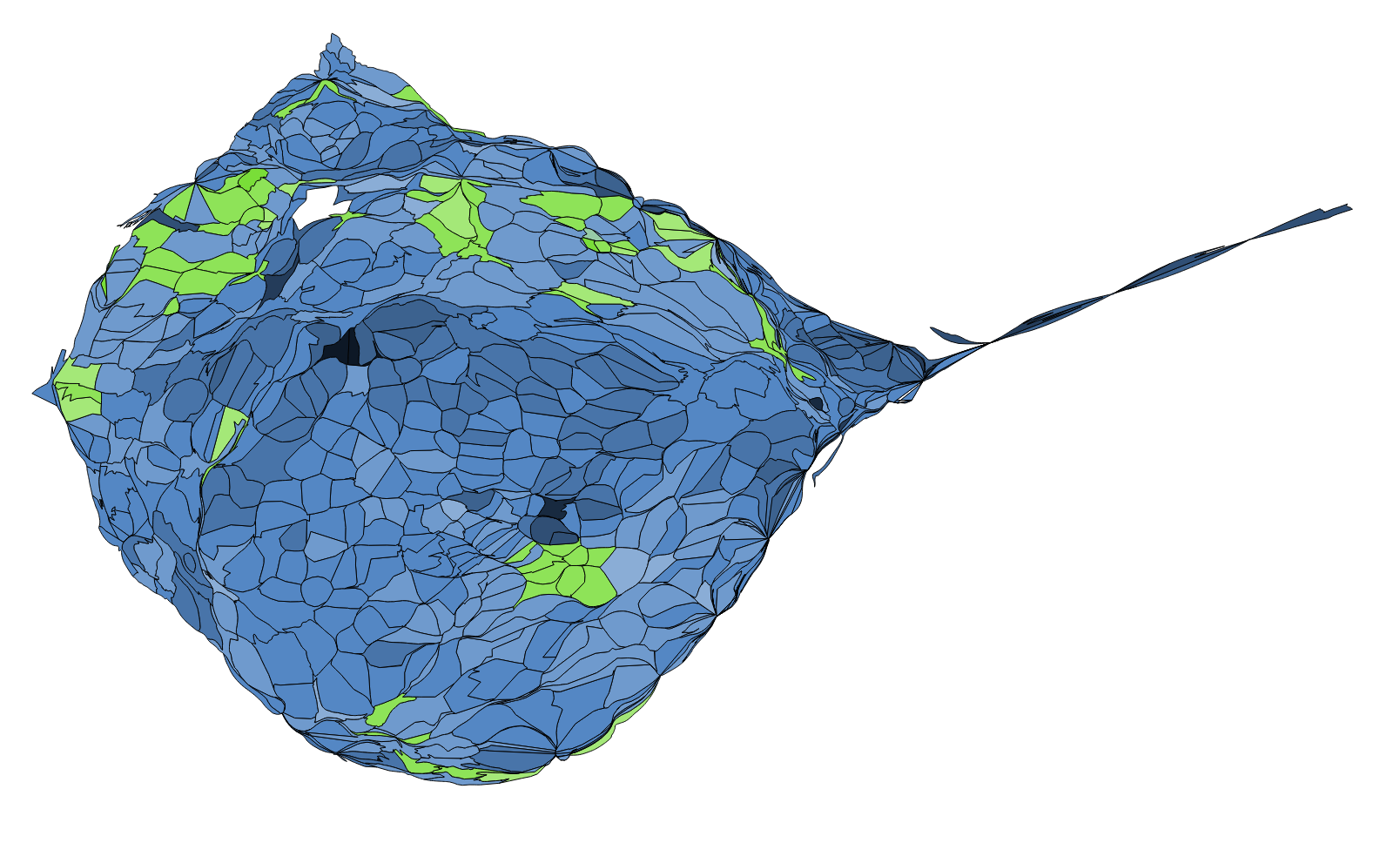

District	Sung Antony		Lin Chia-lung		Lu Shiow-yen	
District	Votes	%	Votes	%	Votes	%
Central District (中區)	86	0.94	4,173	45.77	4,859	53.29
East District (東區)	458	1.10	19,078	45.87	22,055	53.03
South District (南區)	658	0.99	28,330	42.77	37,250	56.24
West District (西區)	618	1.03	25,616	42.86	33,534	56.11
North District (北區)	745	0.97	30,187	39.36	45,769	59.67
Xitun District (西屯區)	1,083	0.97	43,307	38.73	67,437	60.30
Nantun District (南屯區)	914	1.08	34,396	40.73	49,134	58.19
Beitun District (北屯區)	1,268	0.91	53,504	38.42	84,485	60.67
Fengyuan District (豐原區)	986	1.10	42,504	47.27	46,436	51.64
Dongshi District (東勢區)	330	1.13	10,727	36.64	18,216	62.23
Dajia District (大甲區)	484	1.15	18,523	44.14	22,958	54.71
Qingshui District (清水區)	525	1.07	22,912	46.80	25,523	52.13
Shalu District (沙鹿區)	530	1.10	20,835	43.27	26,784	55.63
Wuqi District (梧棲區)	365	1.19	14,663	47.67	15,729	51.14
Houli District (后里區)	420	1.36	12,815	41.46	17,677	57.18
Shengang District (神崗區)	424	1.16	18,095	49.65	17,928	49.19
Tanzi District (潭子區)	581	1.01	24,836	43.30	31,938	55.68
Daya District (大雅區)	592	1.21	20,342	41.74	27,797	57.04
Xinshe District (新社區)	209	1.39	6,009	40.10	8,767	58.51
Shigang District (石岡區)	110	1.21	3,571	39.35	5,393	59.43
Waipu District (外埔區)	215	1.17	7,124	38.76	11,040	60.07
Da'an District (大安區)	148	1.24	5,009	42.13	6,732	56.62
Wuri District (烏日區)	465	1.15	16,911	41.93	22,951	56.91
Dadu District (大肚區)	388	1.22	13,558	42.68	17,821	56.10
Longjing District (龍井區)	572	1.38	18,048	43.62	22,757	55.00
Wufeng District (霧峰區)	415	1.11	16,151	43.07	20,936	55.83
Taiping District (太平區)	1,057	1.12	40,025	42.27	53,613	56.62
Dali District (大里區)	1,202	1.14	46,571	44.23	57,527	54.63
Heping District (和平區)	71	1.01	2,035	28.84	4,950	70.15

2018 Taichung City mayoral results
No.	Candidate	Party	Votes	Percentage
1	Sung Antony (宋原通)	Independent	15,919	1.09%
2	Lin Chia-lung (林佳龍)	Democratic Progressive Party	619,855	42.35%
3	Lu Shiow-yen (盧秀燕)	Kuomintang	827,996	56.57%
Total voters			2,213,789	
Valid votes			1,463,770	
Invalid votes				
Voter turnout			66.12%	

=== Tainan ===
Political context prior to the elections

Results of Past Tainan County Magistrate Elections
Year	Winning Candidate	Political Party
1989	Lee Ya-chiao	Kuomintang
1993	Mark Chen Tang-shan	Democratic Progressive Party
1997	Mark Chen Tang-shan	Democratic Progressive Party
2001	Su Huan-chih	Democratic Progressive Party
2005	Su Huan-chih	Democratic Progressive Party

Results of Past Tainan City Mayoral Elections
Year	Winning Candidate	Political Party
1989	Shih Chih-ming	Kuomintang
1993	Shih Chih-ming	Kuomintang
1997	George Chang Tsan-hung	Democratic Progressive Party
2001	Hsu Tain-tsair	Democratic Progressive Party
2005	Hsu Tain-tsair	Democratic Progressive Party
2010	William Lai	Democratic Progressive Party
2014	William Lai	Democratic Progressive Party

Tainan City is located in Taiwan's Chia-Nan Plain, is a cultural capital for its history. Tainan City was merged and reorganized at the end of 2010, merging with Tainan County of Taiwan Province.

The original Tainan County in the 1990s, Kuomintang local faction took turns taking control. However, Tainan County turned blue to green until Democratic Progressive Party's candidate Mark Chen became the mayor in 1993 until the merger between the county and the city was since led by the Democratic Progressive Party.

The original Tainan City was dominated by Independents and the Kuomintang government for many years before the 1990s. Since 1997, the Democratic Progressive Party candidate Helen Chang was elected mayor, the former Tainan City since had been governed by the Democratic Progressive Party at the county level. After the merger of counties and cities in 2010, the DPP's William Lai was also elected as mayor.

Tainan City

Highest vote share
Party	Year	Vote share %
Democratic Progressive Party	2014 local election	73%
Kuomintang	2008 presidential election	46%

2016 election results
Party	Presidential %	Legislative seats	Legislative %
Democratic Progressive Party	67.52%	5	69.95%
Kuomintang	22.07%	0	24.80%
New Power Party	-	0	0.69%
Taiwan Solidarity Union	-	0	-
People First Party	10.41%	0	-
Independent/Others	-	0	4.56%

Results of the primary

2018 Democratic Progressive Party Tainan City mayoral primary results
Candidates	Place	Results
Huang Wei-cher	Nominated	41.58%
Chen Ting-fei	2nd	28.17%
Yen Chun-zuo	3rd	6.72%
Wang Ding-yu	4th	5.13%
Li Jun-yi	5th	2.11%
Yeh Yi-jin	6th	0.76%

2018 Kuomintang Tainan City mayoral primary results
Candidates	Place	Result
Kao Su-po	Nominated	Results not released
Huang Hsiu-shuang	2nd	Results not released

Opinion polls

Poll organization	Dates conducted	Huang Wei-cher	Kao Su-po	Lin Yi-feng	Not sure	Lead
Taiwan Brain Trust^{1}	May 22, 2018	42.3%	18.7%	－	30.6%	23.6%
ETtoday	May 24, 2018	31.2%	18.5%	2.9%	30.2%	12.7%
China Times^{2}	June 11, 2018	40.3%	17.3%	－	29.7%	23%
Evidence-Based^{3}	June 25, 2018	37.8%	8.0%	4.7%	41.7%	29.8%
TVBS^{4}	July 6, 2018	41%	15%	7%	20%	26%
Taiwan Competitiveness Forum^{5}	July 13, 2018	31.7%	16.1%	6.6%	32.3%	15.6%
Era Com^{6}	July 14, 2018	36.66%	13.09%	8.21%	28.99%	23.57%
Evidence Based^{7}	August 3, 2018	40.0%	12.1%	11.9%	25.6%	27.9%
Liberty News Net^{8}	August 17, 2018	40.6%	11.6%	9.7%	32%	29%
ETtoday	August 27, 2018	31.3%	15.9%	14.1%	26.7%	15.4%
Real Survey^{9}	September 6, 2018	24.5%	16.4%	12.0%	39%	8.1%
Evidence Based^{10}	September 11, 2018	35.8%	14.1%	14.3%	24.7%	11.7%
Kao Su-po Campaign Team^{11}	September 13, 2018	22.9%	19.0%	13.9%	33.8%	3.9%
DPP	September 13, 2018	39.9%	14.7%	14.6%	26.5%	25.2%
Shih Shin University^{12}	September 13, 2018	23.9%	13.8%	5.9%	48.1%	10.1%
TVBS^{13}	September 16, 2018	33%	14%	13%	40%	19%
UDN^{14}	September 25, 2018	31%	12%	14%	35%	17%
Kao Su-po Campaign Team^{15}	October 3, 2018	28.1%	20.1%	11.8%	28.5%	8%
ETtoday	October 7, 2018	30.8%	19.1%	14.2%	22.1%	11.7%
Evidence Based^{16}	October 9, 2018	34.5%	13.6%	15.3%	28.1%	19.2%
Taiwan Competitiveness Forum^{17}	October 19. 2018	27.5%	20.3%	10.9%	31.6%	7.2%
Evidence Based^{18}	October 26. 2018	31.7%	15.5%	12.9%	32.5%	16.2%
China Times^{19}	October 28. 2018	24.6%	17.6%	15.7%	35.7%	7%
Taiwan Competitiveness Forum^{20}	November 4, 2018	29.1%	25.9%	12.6%	18.9%	3.2%
Shih Shin University^{21}	November 5, 2018	25.6%	21.1%	6.5%	40.7%	4.5%
ETtoday	November 8, 2018	30.5%	19.1%	17.6%	33.2%	11.4%
Taiwan Competitiveness Forum^{22}	November 9, 2018	30.4%	31.6%	10.6%	16.7%	1.2%
Note：* Opinion polls includes independent candidates.^{1}： Hsu Chun-hsin（8.4%）^{2}： Hsu Chun-hsin（5.9%）^{3}： Hsu Chun-hsin（3.4%）^{4}： Su Huan-chih（8%）； Hsu Chun-hsin（3%）^{5}： Su Huan-chih（6.2%）； Hsu Chun-hsin（3.7%）^{6}： Su Huan-chih（7.35%）； Hsu Chun-hsin（3.25%）^{7}： Su Huan-chih（3.5%）； Hsu Chun-hsin（3.7%）^{8}： Su Huan-chih（2.0%）； Hsu Chun-hsin（2.7%）^{9}： Su Huan-chih（4.3%）； Hsu Chun-hsin（3.8%）^{10}： Su Huan-chih（6.7%）； Hsu Chun-hsin（3.9%）； Chen Yung-ho（0.2%）^{11}： Su Huan-chih（6.2%）； Hsu Chun-hsin（4.2%）； Chen Yung-ho（0.4%）^{12}： Su Huan-chih（4.9%）； Hsu Chun-hsin（3%）； Chen Yung-ho（0.4%）^{13}： Su Huan-chih（6%）； Hsu Chun-hsin（3%）； Chen Yung-ho（0.4%）^{14}： Su Huan-chih（5%）； Hsu Chun-hsin（2%）； Chen Yung-ho（1%）^{15}： Su Huan-chih（4.8%）； Hsu Chun-hsin（5.8%）； Chen Yung-ho（1%）^{16}： Su Huan-chih（4.3%）； Hsu Chun-hsin（3.1%）； Chen Yung-ho（0.2%）^{17}： Su Huan-chih（4.6%）； Hsu Chun-hsin（4.4%）； Chen Yung-ho（0.7%）^{18}： Su Huan-chih（3%）； Hsu Chun-hsin（3.2%）； Chen Yung-ho（1.2%）^{19}： Su Huan-chih（3.2%）； Hsu Chun-hsin（2.5%）； Chen Yung-ho（0.6%）^{20}：（11.6%）^{21}： Su Huan-chih（4.9%）； Hsu Chun-hsin（3.0%）； Chen Yung-ho（1.4%）^{22}：（8.6%）

Results

Huang lead > 950 Huang lead > 240 Huang lead < 240 Kao lead < 240 Kao lead > 240 Kao lead > 950

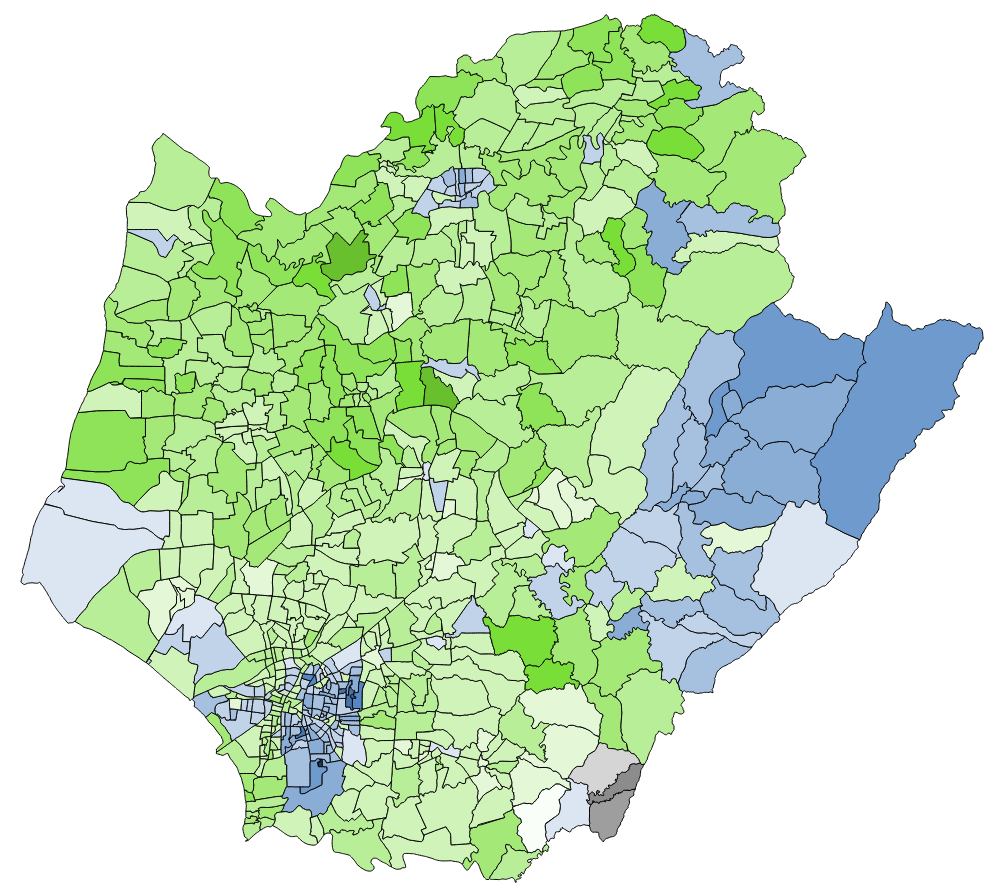

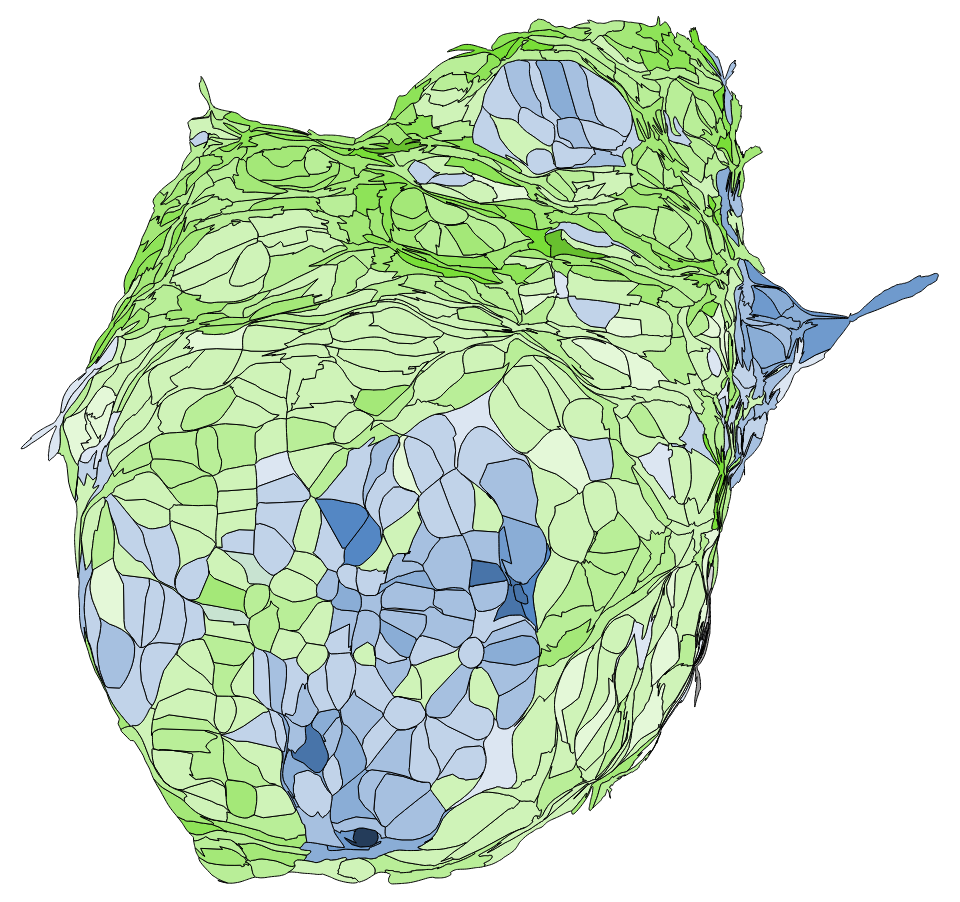

District	Huang Wei-cher		Kao Su-po		Lin Yi-feng		Hsu Chun-hsin		Chen Yung-ho		Su Huan-chih	
District	Votes	%	Votes	%	Votes	%	Votes	%	Votes	%	Votes	%
Sinying District (新營區)	13,462	35.26	14,120	36.98	4,359	11.42	1,616	4.23	3,176	8.32	1,448	3.79
Yanshuei District (鹽水區)	6,555	45.92	3,981	27.89	1,618	11.33	566	3.96	862	6.04	694	4.86
Baihe District (白河區)	7,130	46.44	4,715	30.71	1,371	8.93	562	3.66	705	4.59	871	5.67
Liouying District (柳營區)	5,212	42.68	3,630	29.72	1,578	12.92	506	4.14	777	6.36	510	4.18
Houbi District (後壁區)	6,345	45.95	3,940	28.53	1,458	10.56	552	4.00	662	4.79	852	6.17
Dongshan District (東山區)	4,627	42.01	3,742	33.97	1,111	10.09	495	4.49	475	4.30	565	5.13
Madou District (麻豆區)	11,716	48.58	5,630	23.34	2,086	8.65	1,402	5.81	2,343	9.71	941	3.90
Xiaying District (下營區)	5,492	42.59	3,767	29.21	1,449	11.24	664	5.15	1,031	8.00	492	3.82
Lioujia District (六甲區)	5,309	43.24	3,260	26.55	1,381	11.25	674	5.49	1,022	8.32	633	5.16
Guantian District (官田區)	5,514	45.37	3,107	25.56	1,265	10.41	678	5.58	1,025	8.43	565	4.65
Danei District (大內區)	2,271	39.13	1,687	29.07	673	11.60	397	6.84	481	8.29	295	5.08
Jiali District (佳里區)	12,783	40.53	9,178	29.10	3,005	9.53	2,001	6.34	3,366	10.67	1,205	3.82
Syuejia District (學甲區)	6,509	47.08	3,860	27.92	1,228	8.88	570	4.12	1,107	8.01	552	3.99
Sigang District (西港區)	6,041	43.79	3,593	26.05	1,387	10.06	722	5.23	1,536	11.14	515	3.73
Cigu District (七股區)	5,670	43.39	3,251	24.88	1,347	10.31	960	7.35	1,144	8.75	695	5.32
Jiangjyun District (將軍區)	5,438	45.68	3,109	26.12	1,115	9.37	873	7.33	912	7.66	457	3.84
Beimen District (北門區)	2,757	42.63	1,877	29.02	652	10.08	395	6.11	448	6.93	339	5.24
Sinhua District (新化區)	9,154	38.46	7,591	31.89	2,223	9.34	1,102	4.63	2,822	11.86	911	3.83
Shanhua District (善化區)	9,435	39.40	6,948	29.02	2,001	8.36	1,583	6.61	2,878	12.02	1,099	4.59
Sinshih District (新市區)	7,027	37.42	5,034	26.81	1,605	8.55	2,012	10.71	2,340	12.46	762	4.06
Anding District (安定區)	6,643	40.09	4,752	28.67	1,576	9.51	899	5.42	1,997	12.05	705	4.25
Shanshang District (山上區)	1,521	37.37	1,244	30.57	467	11.47	217	5.33	423	10.39	198	4.86
Yujing District (玉井區)	2,656	32.54	3,442	42.17	665	8.15	302	3.70	632	7.74	465	7.74
Nansi District (楠西區)	1,576	28.48	2,687	48.56	400	7.23	218	3.94	353	6.38	299	5.40
Nanhua District (南化區)	1,792	33.17	2,229	41.26	474	8.77	173	3.20	402	7.44	332	6.15
Zuojhen District (左鎮區)	1,233	41.80	939	31.83	195	6.61	211	7.15	221	7.49	151	5.12
Rende District (仁德區)	14,717	36.41	12,883	31.88	3,522	8.71	1,537	3.80	5,911	14.63	1,846	4.57
Gueiren District (歸仁區)	13,413	37.57	9,264	25.95	2,942	8.24	1,292	3.62	7,202	20.17	1,588	4.45
Guanmiao District (關廟區)	7,670	37.11	5,323	25.76	1,580	7.65	573	2.77	4,778	23.12	742	3.59
Longci District (龍崎區)	814	29.24	676	24.28	180	6.47	82	2.95	917	32.94	115	4.13
Yongkang District (永康區)	38,762	34.70	38,892	34.81	9,587	8.58	4,676	4.19	15,007	13.43	4,787	4.29
East District (東區)	28,636	32.27	36,041	40.61	5,457	6.15	3,522	3.97	11,681	13.16	3,410	3.84
South District (南區)	25,068	39.35	21,036	33.02	5,430	8.52	2,585	4.06	7,661	12.03	1,925	3.02
North District (北區)	22,694	34.49	24,690	37.52	4,510	6.85	2,851	4.33	8,547	12.99	2,515	3.82
Annan District (安南區)	36,754	38.42	27,865	29.13	9,225	9.64	4,807	5.02	13,357	13.96	3,655	3.82
Anping District (安平區)	10,276	34.24	11,056	36.84	2,479	8.26	1,034	3.45	4,075	13.58	1,088	3.63
West Central District (中西區)	14,846	37.54	13,835	34.98	2,552	6.45	1,859	4.70	4,904	12.40	1,556	3.93

2018 Tainan City mayoral results
No.	Candidate	Party	Votes	Percentage
1	Huang Wei-cher (黃偉哲)	Democratic Progressive Party	367,518	38.02%
2	Kao Su-po (高思博)	Kuomintang	312,874	32.37%
3	Lin Yi-feng (林義豐)	Independent	84,153	8.71%
4	Hsu Chun-hsin (許忠信)	Independent	45,168	4.67%
5	Chen Yung-ho (陳永和)	Independent	117,179	12.12%
6	Su Huan-chih (蘇煥智)	Independent	39,778	4.11%
Total voters			1,546,862	
Valid votes			966,670	
Invalid votes				
Voter turnout			62.49%	

=== Kaohsiung ===
Political context prior to the elections

Results of Past Kaohsiung Municipal Mayoral Elections
Year	Winning Candidate	Political Party
1994	Wu Den-yih	Kuomintang
1998	Frank Hsieh Chang-ting	Democratic Progressive Party
2002	Frank Hsieh Chang-ting	Democratic Progressive Party
2006	Chen Chu	Democratic Progressive Party
2010	Chen Chu	Democratic Progressive Party
2014	Chen Chu	Democratic Progressive Party

Results of Past Kaohsiung County Magistrate Elections
Year	Winning Candidate	Political Party
1989	Yu Chen Yueh-ying	Democratic Progressive Party
1993	Yu Cheng-hsien	Democratic Progressive Party
1997	Yu Cheng-hsien	Democratic Progressive Party
2001	Yang Chiu-hsing	Democratic Progressive Party
2005	Yang Chiu-hsing	Democratic Progressive Party

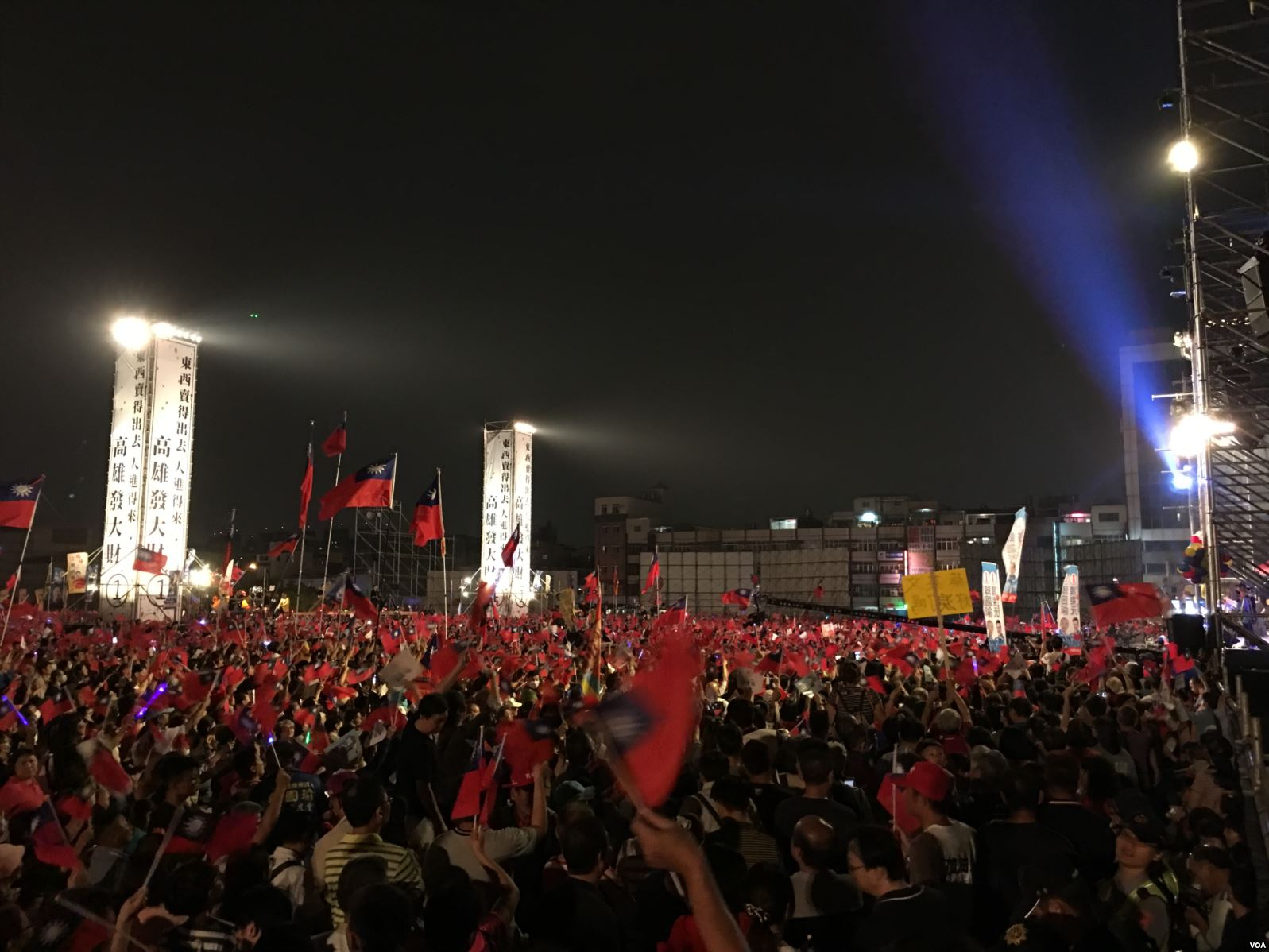
17 November 2018 Han Kuo-yu's campaign rally in Fengshan, Kaohsiung

Kaohsiung is the third largest city in Taiwan and capital of the political and economic center of the southern region. The special municipality city is merged in 2010 with Kaohsiung County from Taiwan Province. The former Kaohsiung County before the 1980s is led by the Kuomintang, and the independents until 1985 where Democratic Progressive Party has led the county until the merger of the county and city.

Since the implementation of local autonomy in 1950, the former Kaohsiung City has been led by the KMT except the 6th mayor Yang Jinhu, who was a non-KMT candidate. After Kaohsiung was elevated into a municipality in 1979, the mayor was appointed by the Central Government and opened up first election in 1994 where Kuomintang's Wu Den-yih was first elected mayor of the city. In 1998, the Democratic Progressive Party's Frank Hsieh won the mayoral election by a slim margin over the incumbent mayor Wu Den-yih, starting the DPP's straight 4 terms, 16 years rule until the merger.

Kaohsiung City

Highest vote share
Party	Year	Vote share %
Democratic Progressive Party	2014 local election	68%
Kuomintang	2008 legislative election	51%

2016 election results
Party	Presidential %	Legislative seats	Legislative %
Democratic Progressive Party	63.39%	9	61%
Kuomintang	26.00%	0	34.86%
New Power Party	-	0	1.06%
Taiwan Solidarity Union	-	0	-
People First Party	10.60%	0	-
Independent/Others	-	0	3.08%

Results of the primary

2018 Democratic Progressive Party Kaohsiung City mayoral primary results
Candidates	Place	DPP	Focus Survey Research	Statinc	Aggregated Result
Chen Chi-mai	Nominated	38.64%	32.61%	36.45%	35.90%
None of the candidates		32.71%	31.76%	34.74%	33.07%
Chao Tien-lin	2nd	12.63%	17.95%	12.77%	14.45%
Lin Tai-hua	3rd	10.69%	12.06%	10.92%	11.22%
Kuan Bi-ling	4th	5.33%	5.61%	5.12%	5.35%

2018 Kuomintang Kaohsiung City mayoral primary results
Candidates	Place	Result
Han Kuo-yu	Nominated	64.898%
Arthur Chen	2nd	35.102%

Opinion polls

Poll organization	Dates conducted	Chen Chi-mai	Han Kuo-yu	Not sure	Lead
TVBS	August 15, 2017	59%	31%	10%	28%
Taiwan Brain Trust	May 22, 2018	52%	21%	27%	31%
China Times	May 29, 2018	39.5%	33.1%	-	6.4%
All Opinions	June 20, 2018	37.6%	26.2%	36.2%	11.4%
GSSC	June 27, 2018	46.9%	23.9%	29.2%	23%
ETtoday^{1}	June 27, 2018	32.0%	30.4%	24.7%	1.6%
TVBS	July 4, 2018	40%	32%	28%	8%
GSSC	July 27, 2018	45.7%	27.3%	21.7%	18.4%
Liberty Times Net	August 3, 2018	38.46%	26.42%	35.22%	12.04%
Formosa	August 13, 2018	38.9%	27.8%	33.3%	11.1%
Wu Yi-zheng Campaign Team	August 17, 2018	33.5%	25.7%	34%	7.8%
ETtoday^{2}	September 3, 2018	36.7%	31%	32.3%	5.7%
TVBS^{3}	September 16, 2018	39%	35%	26%	4%
Shih Shin University^{4}	September 16, 2018	33.8%	31.2%	35%	2.6%
CM Media	September 18, 2018	41.2%	35.5%	22.9%	5.7%
TISR^{5}	September 19, 2018	41%	30.2%	25.9%	10.8%
UDN^{6}	September 20, 2018	34%	32%	31%	2%
TVBS^{8}	October 16, 2018	35%	42%	21%	7%
Taiwan Next Gen Foundation^{9}	October 19, 2018	39.8%	32.5%	24.7%	7.3%
Taiwan Competitiveness Forum^{10}	October 22, 2018	32.7%	39%	26.3%	6.3%
Taiwan Competitiveness Forum^{11}	October 31, 2018	32.3%	43.1%	22.7%	10.8%
Apollo^{12}	November 2, 2018	36.2%	45.3%	14.6%	9.3%
Sanli^{13}	November 4, 2018	44.3%	43.2%	11.1%	1.1%
TVBS^{14}	November 6, 2018	38%	48%	14%	10%
Apollo^{15}	November 7, 2018	37.6%	40.4%	10%	2.8%
CM Media^{16}	November 8, 2018	39.1%	39.3%	20.3%	0.2%
ETtoday	November 8, 2018	36.6%	42.6%	20.8%	6%
Taiwan Competitiveness Forum^{17}	November 8, 2018	27.1%	44.1%	23.8%	17%
UDN^{18}	November 12, 2018	32%	49%	16%	17%
Shih Shin University^{19}	November 12, 2018	32.6%	35.4%	29.9%	2.8%
Apollo	November 12, 2018	38.9%	42.5%	14.9%	3.6%
Sanli^{20}	November 12, 2018	43.6%	40.5%	13.9%	3.1%
Note：* Opinion polls includes independent candidates.^{1}： Chu Mei-feng（1.1%）^{2}： Chu Mei-feng（0.6%）^{3}： Chu Mei-feng（0.1%）； Su Ying-guei（1%）^{4}： Chu Mei-feng（0.7%）； Su Ying-guei（0.4%）^{5}： Chu Mei-feng（0.4%）； Su Ying-guei（2.5%）^{6}： Chu Mei-feng（2%）； Su Ying-guei（1%）^{7}： Chu Mei-feng（1.1%）； Su Ying-guei（1.2%）^{8}： Chu Mei-feng（1%）； Su Ying-guei（1%）^{9}： Chu Mei-feng（1.7%）； Su Ying-guei（1.3%）^{10}： Chu Mei-feng（1.1%）； Su Ying-guei（0.8%）^{11}： Chu Mei-feng（0.8%）； Su Ying-guei（1.1%）^{12}： Chu Mei-feng（0.8%）； Su Ying-guei（2.1%）^{13}： Chu Mei-feng（0.7%）； Su Ying-guei（0.8%）^{14}： Chu Mei-feng（1%）； Su Ying-guei（0.3%）^{15}： Chu Mei-feng（1.1%）； Su Ying-guei（1.2%）^{16}： Chu Mei-feng（0.6%）； Su Ying-guei（0.7%）^{17}： Chu Mei-feng（0.5%）； Su Ying-guei（0.5%）^{18}： Chu Mei-feng（1%）； Su Ying-guei（2%）^{19}： Chu Mei-feng（1.5%）； Su Ying-guei（0.6%）^{20}： Chu Mei-feng（1.3%）； Su Ying-guei（0.7%）

Predictions

Poll organization	Date of completion	Turnout	Chen Chi-mai	Han Kuo-yu
TVBS	October 16, 2018	67%	49%	49%
TVBS	November 6, 2018	72%	47%	52%

Results

Han lead > 4,400 Han lead > 1,100 Han lead < 1,100 Chen lead < 1,100 Chen lead > 1,100 Chen lead > 4,400

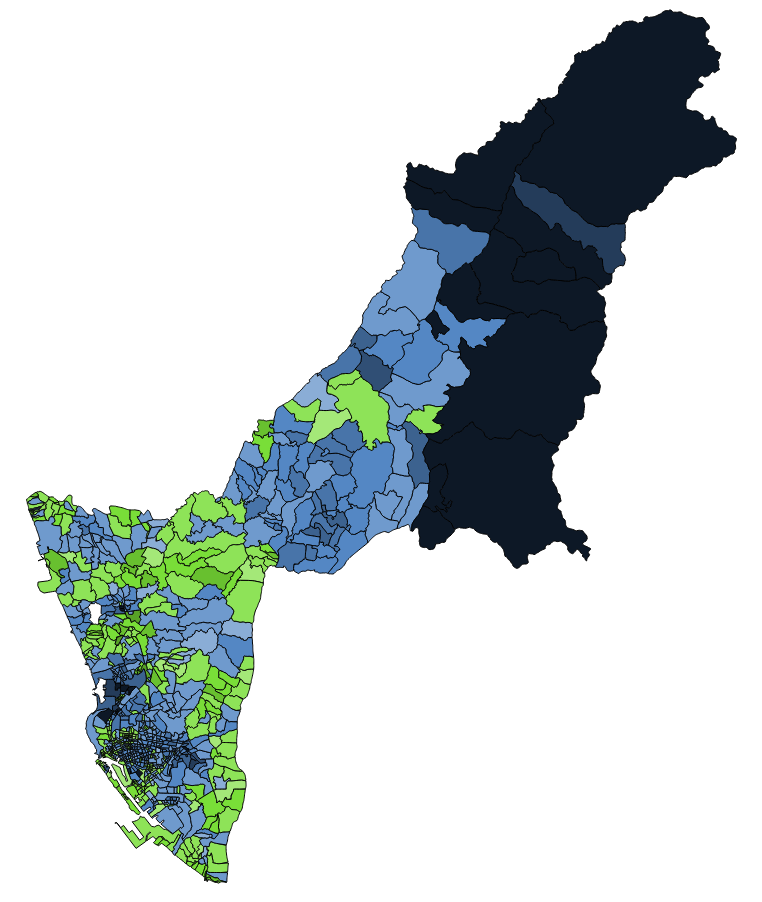

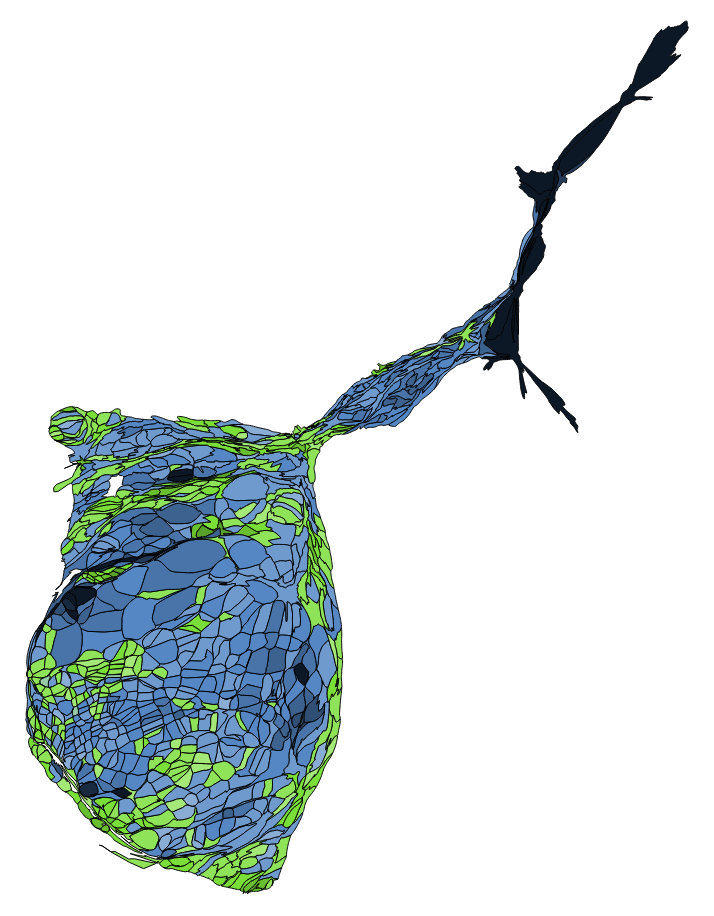

District	Han Kuo-yu		Chen Chi-mai		Chu Mei-feng		Su Ying-guei	
District	Votes	%	Votes	%	Votes	%	Votes	%
Yancheng District (鹽埕區)	7,633	48.28	7,992	50.55	71	0.45	113	0.71
Gushan District (鼓山區)	45,816	57.04	33,547	41.77	267	0.33	691	0.86
Zuoying District (左營區)	68,255	61.99	40,526	36.81	346	0.31	978	0.89
Nanzih District (楠梓區)	59,478	56.58	44,288	42.13	379	0.36	973	0.93
Sanmin District (三民區)	105,406	52.79	91,617	45.88	772	0.39	1,872	0.94
Sinsing District (新興區)	16,776	53.34	14,237	45.26	107	0.34	334	1.06
Cianjin District (前金區)	9,120	53.83	7,608	44.91	53	0.31	161	0.95
Lingya District (苓雅區)	57,171	54.60	46,041	43.97	401	0.38	1,098	1.05
Cianjhen District (前鎮區)	59,572	52.53	52,376	46.19	472	0.42	982	0.87
Cijin District (旗津區)	7,993	45.49	9,360	53.27	95	0.54	124	0.71
Siaogang District (小港區)	47,806	51.70	43,464	47.00	433	0.47	764	0.83
Fongshan District (鳳山區)	118,466	56.54	88,437	42.21	881	0.42	1,739	0.83
Linyuan District (林園區)	20,149	47.40	21,847	51.40	219	0.52	293	0.69
Daliao District (大寮區)	35,636	52.17	31,773	46.51	372	0.54	533	0.78
Dashu District (大樹區)	12,945	48.33	13,493	50.38	174	0.65	173	0.65
Dashe District (大社區)	10,378	48.89	10,512	49.52	142	0.67	197	0.93
Renwu District (仁武區)	26,659	51.40	24,543	47.32	250	0.48	412	0.79
Niaosong District (鳥松區)	14,410	52.23	12,806	46.42	115	0.42	258	0.94
Gangshan District (岡山區)	32,410	54.93	25,829	43.78	313	0.53	446	0.76
Ciaotou District (橋頭區)	10,888	44.45	13,256	54.11	146	0.60	207	0.85
Yanchao District (燕巢區)	9,448	50.88	8,871	47.77	120	0.65	130	0.70
Tianliao District (田寮區)	2,252	43.58	2,768	53.56	135	2.61	13	0.25
Alian District (阿蓮區)	8,322	47.12	8,958	50.72	254	1.44	126	0.71
Lujhu District (路竹區)	16,545	52.43	14,407	45.66	319	1.01	284	0.90
Hunei District (湖內區)	9,133	49.67	8,903	48.42	187	1.02	164	0.89
Qieding District (茄萣區)	8,662	47.72	9,209	50.74	152	0.84	127	0.70
Yong'an District (永安區)	4,545	49.62	4,478	48.89	61	0.67	76	0.83
Mituo District (彌陀區)	6,756	52.77	5,871	45.86	86	0.67	89	0.70
Ziguan District (梓官區)	10,509	46.81	11,646	51.87	129	0.57	168	0.75
Cishan District (旗山區)	12,379	52.34	10,940	46.26	155	0.66	177	0.75
Meinong District (美濃區)	15,478	61.09	9,546	37.68	125	0.49	186	0.73
Liouguei District (六龜區)	4,084	54.29	3,315	37.68	64	0.85	59	0.78
Jiasian District (六龜區)	2,339	60.17	1,483	38.15	35	0.90	30	0.77
Shanlin District (杉林區)	4,129	56.45	3,076	42.05	53	0.72	57	0.78
Neimen District (內門區)	5,446	53.81	4,510	44.57	85	0.84	79	0.78
Maolin District (茂林區)	1,281	91.83	107	7.67	6	0.43	1	0.07
Taoyuan District (桃源區)	2,519	88.51	304	10.68	14	0.49	9	0.32
Namasia District (那瑪夏區)	1,751	85.08	295	14.33	10	0.49	2	0.10

2018 Kaohsiung City mayoral results
No.	Candidate	Party	Votes	Percentage
1	Han Kuo-yu (韓國瑜)	Kuomintang	892,545	53.87%
2	Chen Chi-mai (陳其邁)	Democratic Progressive Party	742,239	44.80%
3	Chu Mei-feng (璩美鳳)	Independent	7,998	0.48%
4	Su Ying-guei (蘇盈貴)	Independent	14,125	0.85%
Total voters			2,281,338	
Valid votes			1,656,907	
Invalid votes			20,743	
Voter turnout			72.63%	

== Taiwan Province ==
=== Keelung ===
Political context prior to the elections

Results of Past Keelung City Mayoral Elections
Year	Winning Candidate	Political Party
1997	Lee Chin-yung	Democratic Progressive Party
2001	Hsu Tsai-li	Kuomintang
2005	Hsu Tsai-li	Kuomintang
2009	Chang Tong-rong	Kuomintang
2014	Lin Yu-chang	Democratic Progressive Party

Keelung City

Highest vote share
Party	Year	Vote share %
Democratic Progressive Party	2014 local election	53%
Kuomintang	2008 legislative election	68%

2016 election results
Party	Presidential %	Legislative seat	Legislative %
Democratic Progressive Party	48.22%	1	41.45%
Kuomintang	35.29%	0	36.15%
New Power Party	-	0	-
Taiwan Solidarity Union	-	0	-
People First Party	16.50%	0	12.37%
Independent/Others	-	0	10.03%

Results of the primary

2018 Democratic Progressive Party Keelung City mayoral primary results
Candidates	Place	Result
Lin Yu-chang	Nominated	Walkover

2018 Kuomintang Keelung City mayoral primary results
Candidates	Place	Results
Hsieh Li-kung	Nominated after negotiation	39.92%
Song Wei-li	1st but withdrew after negotiation	41.49%
Wen-Chieh Dale Jieh	3rd	18.59%

Opinion polls

Poll organization	Dates conducted	Lin Yu-chang	Hsieh Li-kung	Not sure	Lead
Sanli	January 16, 2018	58%	15.2%	26.8%	42.8%
ETtoday	March 30, 2018	44.1%	24.0%	31.9%	20.1%
Apollo	July 5, 2018	50%	15.9%	34.1%	34.1%
Evidence Based	October 20, 2018	54.1%	19.8%	26.1%	34.3%
Real Survey	October 29, 2018	42.4%	29.7%	20.6%	12.7%

Results

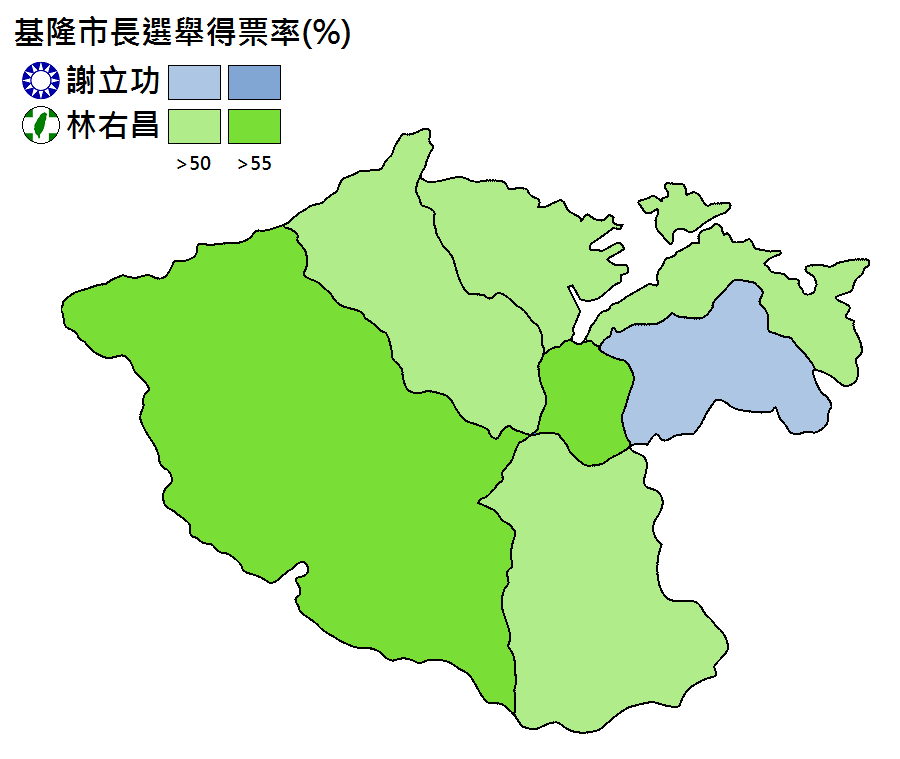

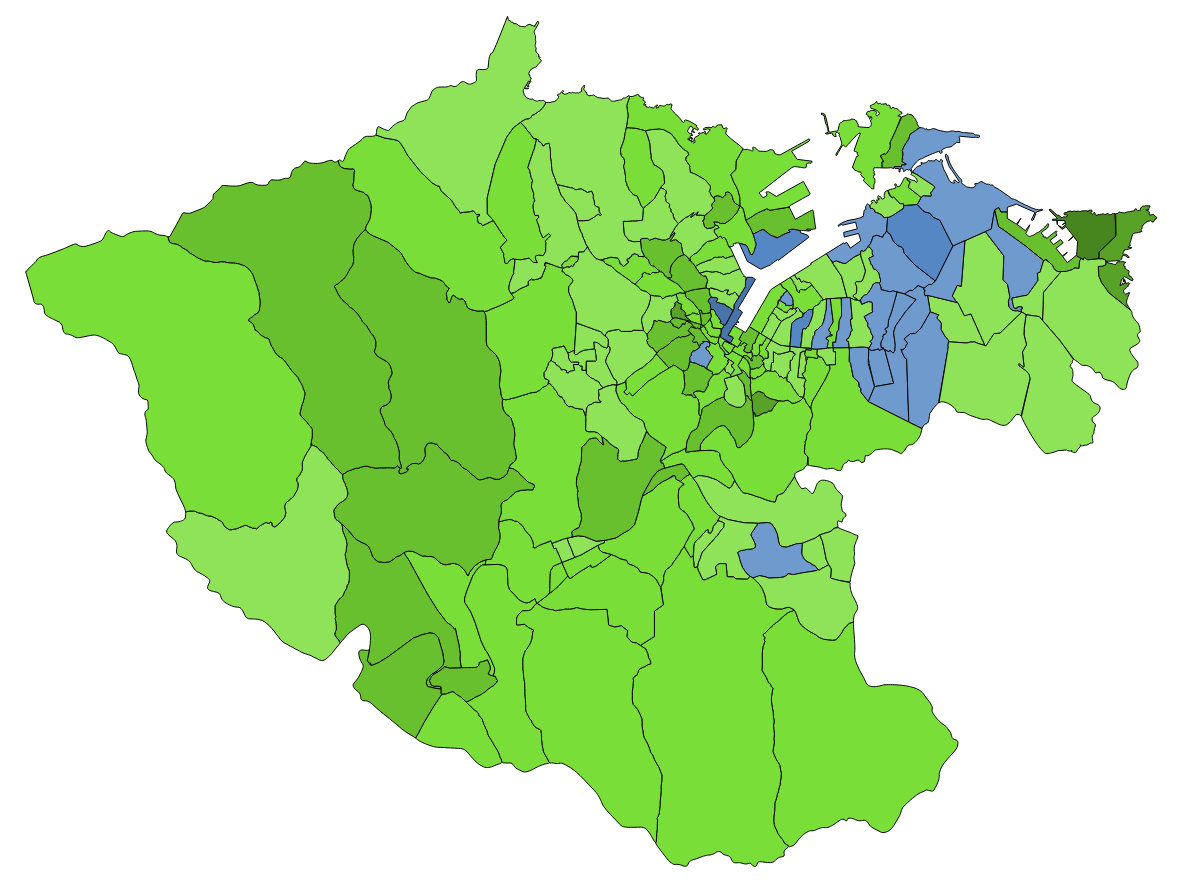
2018 基隆市市長選舉各里得票

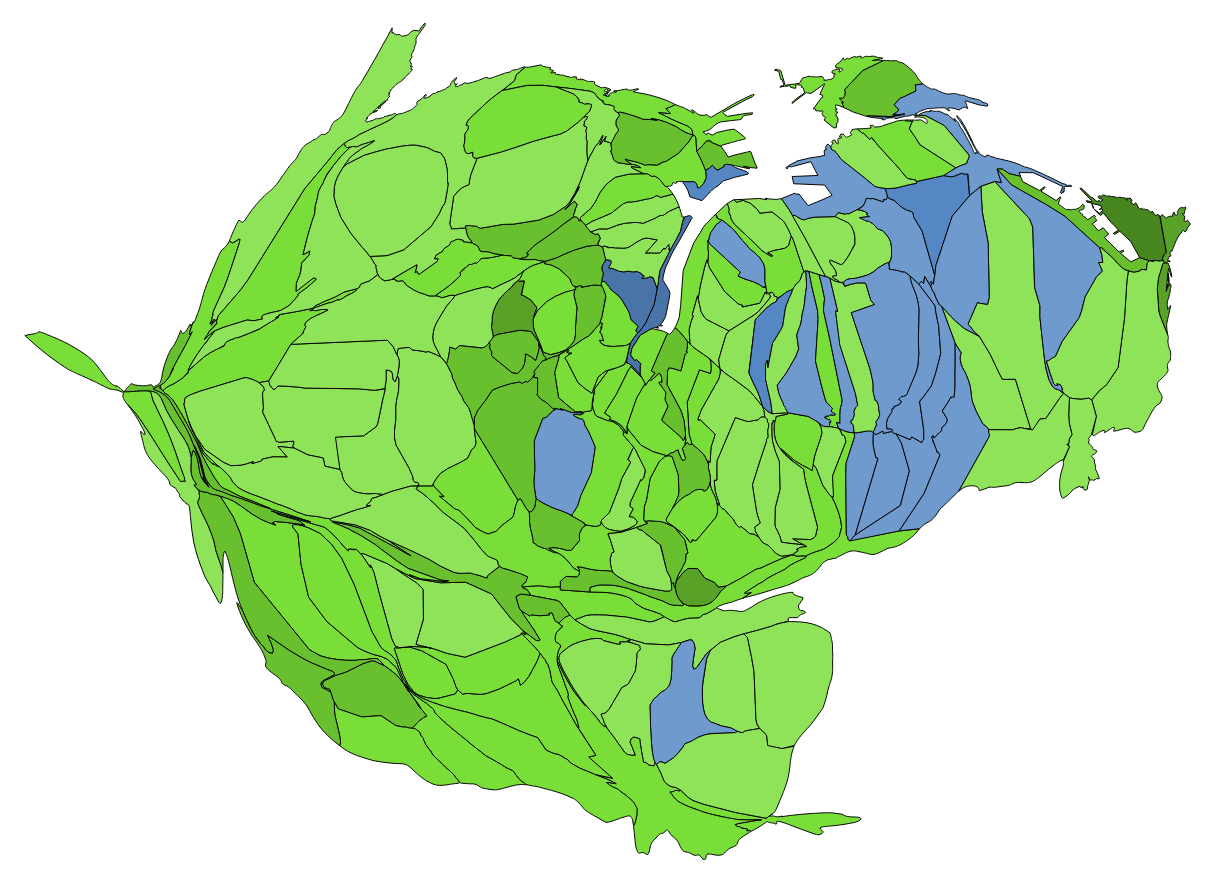
2018 基隆市市長選舉各里得票人口變形圖

District	Hsieh Li-kung		Lin Yu-chang	
District	Votes	%	Votes	%
Zhongzheng District (中正區)	12,009	47.21	13,431	52.79
Qidu District (七堵區)	11,745	42.50	15,891	57.50
Nuannuan District (暖暖區)	9,222	46.76	10,500	53.24
Ren'ai District (仁愛區)	9,877	55.87	12,507	55.87
Zhongshan District (中山區)	11,424	45.51	13,678	54.49
Anle District (安樂區)	18,580	45.04	22,676	54.96
Xinyi District (信義區)	13,672	50.35	13,484	49.65

2018 Keelung City mayoral results
No.	Candidate	Party	Votes	Percentage
1	Hsieh Li-kung (謝立功)	Kuomintang	86,529	45.86%
2	Lin Yu-chang (林右昌)	Democratic Progressive Party	102,167	54.14%
Total voters			309,428	
Valid votes			188,696	
Invalid votes				
Voter turnout			60.98%	

=== Yilan County ===
Political context prior to the elections

Results of Past Yilan County Magistrate Elections
Year	Winning Candidate	Political Party
1997	Liu Shou-ch'eng	Democratic Progressive Party
2001	Liu Shou-ch'eng	Democratic Progressive Party
2005	Lu Kuo-hua	Kuomintang
2009	Lin Tsung-hsien	Democratic Progressive Party
2014	Lin Tsung-hsien	Democratic Progressive Party

Yilan County

Highest vote share
Party	Year	Vote share %
Democratic Progressive Party	2014 local election	64%
Kuomintang	2008 legislative election	53%

2016 election results
Party	Presidential %	Legislative seat	Legislative %
Democratic Progressive Party	62.06%	1	53.68%
Kuomintang	25.38%	0	28.25%
New Power Party	-	0	-
Taiwan Solidarity Union	-	0	-
People First Party	12.55%	0	-
Independent/Others	-	0	18.07%

Results of the primary

2018 Democratic Progressive Party Yilan County magistrate primary results
Candidates	Place	Result
Chen Ou-po	Nominated	Walkover

2018 Kuomintang Yilan County magistrate primary results
Candidates	Place	Result
Lin Zi-miao	Called In	Walkover

Opinion polls

Poll organization	Dates conducted	Chen Ou-po	Lin Tzu-miao	Not sure	Lead
Apollo	April 14, 2017	18.2%	28.6%	53.2%	10.4%
TVBS^{1}	July 21, 2017	23%	57%	20%	34%
Era Com	December 27, 2017	23.37%	45.89%	30.74%	21.52%
ETtoday^{2}	June 11, 2018	15.8%	41.2%	39.1%	25.4%
ETtoday^{3}	September 9, 2018	23.1%	35.6%	25.6%	12.5%
Liberty Times Net^{4}	September 21, 2018	23.38%	37.61%	34.03%	14.23%
CM Media^{5}	September 26, 2018	26.5%	40.1%	25.5%	13.6%
UDN^{6}	October 5, 2018	13%	42%	45%	29%
TVBS^{7}	October 7, 2018	19%	47%	28%	28%
China Times^{8}	October 27, 2018	14.3%	44.6%	36.2%	30.3%
TISR^{9}	November 11, 2018	24.3%	42%	25.9%	17.7%
Chen Ou-po Campaign Team^{10}	November 11, 2018	28.7%	26.6%	28.9%	2.1%
Note：* Opinion polls includes independent candidates.^{1}： Lin Hsin-hua（7.0%）^{2}： Lin Hsin-hua（3.9%）^{3}： Lin Hsin-hua（4.4%）； Chen Qiu-jing（0.7%）； Lin Jin-kun（1.5%）^{4}： Lin Hsin-hua（4.38%）； Chen Qiu-jing（0.3%）； Lin Jin-kun（0.3%）^{5}： Lin Hsin-hua（5.8%）； Chen Qiu-jing（0.5%）； Lin Jin-kun（0.9%）^{6}： Lin Hsin-hua（5%）； Chen Qiu-jing（0.2%）； Lin Jin-kun（0.1%）^{7}： Lin Hsin-hua（5%）； Chen Qiu-jing（1%）； Lin Jin-kun（0.0%）^{8}： Lin Hsin-hua（3.1%）； Chen Qiu-jing（0%）； Lin Jin-kun（0.8%）^{9}： Lin Hsin-hua（4.6%）； Chen Qiu-jing（0.9%）； Lin Jin-kun（0.6%）^{10}： Lin Hsin-hua（15.8%）

Results

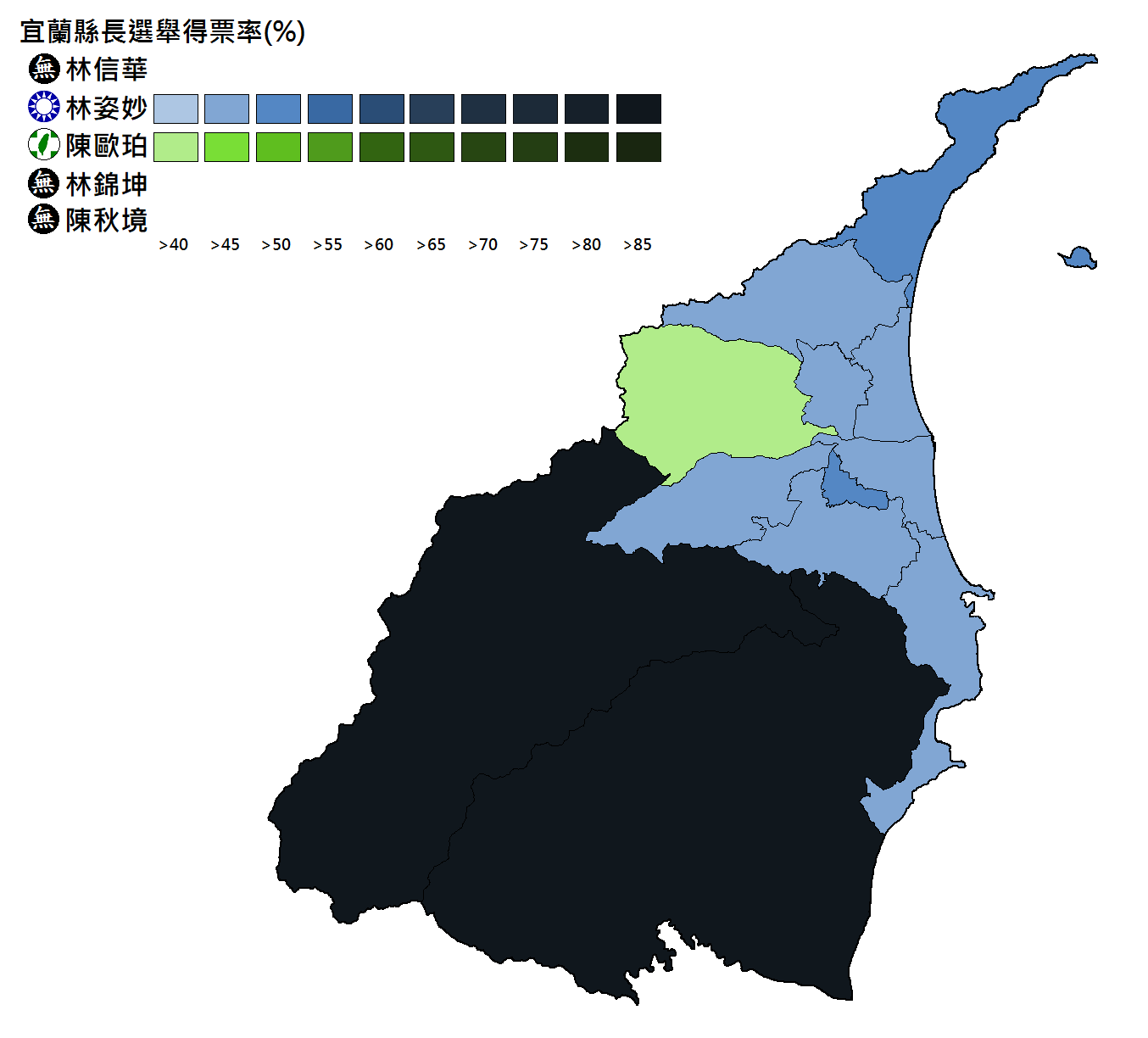

District	Lin Hsin-hua		Lin Zi-miao		Chen Ou-po		Lin Jin-kun		Chen Qiu-jing	
District	Votes	%	Votes	%	Votes	%	Votes	%	Votes	%
Yilan City (宜蘭市)	6,736	13.66	23,891	48.45	18,033	36.57	379	0.76	270	0.54
Luodong Township (羅東鎮)	3,872	11.05	18,457	52.71	18,033	35.39	163	0.46	128	0.36
Su'ao Township (蘇澳鎮)	2,266	9.87	11,341	49.43	8,995	39.20	185	0.80	154	0.67
Toucheng Township (頭城鎮)	1,415	8.25	9,405	54.90	5,973	34.86	167	0.97	171	0.99
Jiaoxi Township (礁溪鄉)	2,314	10.95	9,698	45.91	8,797	41.65	194	0.92	120	0.57
Zhuangwei Township (壯圍鄉)	1,581	10.34	6,978	45.66	6,509	42.59	125	0.82	90	0.59
Yuanshan Township (員山鄉)	1,974	10.77	7,844	42.78	8,154	44.47	264	1.44	101	0.55
Dongshan Township (冬山鄉)	3,138	10.94	13,141	45.83	12,023	41.93	206	0.72	168	0.59
Wujie Township (五結鄉)	1,415	11.84	10,354	47.07	8,782	39.93	142	0.65	112	0.51
Sanxing Township (三星鄉)	1,235	9.69	6,053	47.48	5,314	41.68	74	0.58	72	0.56
Datong Township (大同鄉)	149	3.81	3,360	86.02	374	9.58	9	0.23	14	0.36
Nan'ao Township (南澳鄉)	114	3.12	3,245	88.73	260	7.11	14	0.38	24	0.66

2018 Yilan County mayoral results
No.	Candidate	Party	Votes	Percentage
1	Lin Hsin-hua (林信華)	Independent	27,399	10.95%
2	Lin Zi-miao (林姿妙)	Kuomintang	123,767	49.48%
3	Chen Ou-po (陳歐珀)	Democratic Progressive Party	95,609	38.23%
4	Lin Jin-kun (林錦坤)	Independent	1,922	0.77%
5	Chen Qiu-jing (陳秋境)	Independent	1,424	0.57%
Total voters			373,510	
Valid votes			250,121	
Invalid votes				
Voter turnout			66.97%	

=== Hsinchu County ===
Political context prior to the elections

Results of Past Hsinchu County Magistrate Elections
Year	Winning Candidate	Political Party
1997	Lin Kuang-hua	Democratic Progressive Party
2001	Cheng Yung-chin	Kuomintang
2005	Cheng Yung-chin	Kuomintang
2009	Chiu Ching-chun	Kuomintang
2014	Chiu Ching-chun	Kuomintang

Hsinchu County

Highest vote share
Party	Year	Vote share %
Democratic Progressive Party	2010 legislative by-election	56%
Kuomintang	2008 presidential election	74%

2016 election results
Party	Presidential %	Legislative seat	Legislative %
Democratic Progressive Party	42.52%	0	-
Kuomintang	35.28%	1	36.75%
New Power Party	-	0	-
Taiwan Solidarity Union	-	0	-
People First Party	22.19%	0	-
Independent/Others	-	0	63.25%

Results of the primary

2018 Minkuotang Hsinchu County magistrate primary results
Candidates	Place	Result
Hsu Hsin-ying	Nominated	Walkover

2018 Kuomintang Hsinchu County magistrate primary results
Candidates	Place	Results
Yang Wen-ke	Called In	Walkover
Lin Wei-chou	Failure to get party's nomination	-

2018 Democratic Progressive Party Hsinchu County magistrate primary results
Candidates	Place	Result
Cheng Chao-fang	Called In	Walkover

Opinion polls

Poll organization	Dates conducted	Hsu Hsin-ying	Yang Wen-ko	Cheng Chao-fang	Not sure	Lead
Era Com	January 4, 2018	32.18%	23.59%	-	24.85%	8.59%
China Times	January 26, 2018	17.1%	12.1%	-	-	5%
Apollo	June 16, 2018	20.1%	27%	4.7%	39.8%	6.9%
Apollo	June 21, 2018	18.3%	21.3%	4.5%	38.4%	3%
Era Com	June 22, 2018	40.2%	23.3%	8.82%	18.39%	16.9%
TVBS	June 29, 2018	31%	27%	9%	32%	4%
ETtoday	July 11, 2018	19.7%	26.3%	9.7%	44.2%	6.6%
ETtoday^{Note}	July 27, 2018	27.5%	23.6%	6.5%	17.1%	3.9%
Apollo^{Note}	August 1, 2018	30.5%	25.9%	7.2%	19.2%	4.6%
Daily View^{Note}	August 19, 2018	34.8%	24.47%	21.74%	-	10.33%
Focus Survey Research	August 24, 2018	37.2%	26.7%	12.0%	23.1%	10.5%
Apollo^{Note}	August 25, 2018	20.4%	16.9%	6.2%	31.1%	3.5%
TVBS	August 31, 2018	28%	25%	13%	34%	3%
Era Com	September 10, 2018	32.56%	23.25%	9.11%	35.08%	9.29%
Taiwan Competitiveness Forum^{1}	September 16, 2018	27.8%	23.4%	12.6%	34.8%	4.4%
UDN^{2}	October 2, 2018	31%	25%	11%	32%	6%
TISR^{3}_{c}	October 2, 2018	25.9%	23.3%	9.1%	31.5%	2.6%
Apollo^{4}	October 22, 2018	24.8%	27.5%	10.2%	28.7%	2.7%
Taiwan Competitiveness Forum^{5}	October 29, 2018	24.8%	26%	10.4%	31.4%	1.2%
UDN^{6}	November 2, 2018	36%	29%	11%	23%	7%
Taiwan Competitiveness Forum^{7}	November 7, 2018	25.4%	31.7%	11.7%	26.3%	6.3%
China Times^{8}	November 9, 2018	26.3%	28.7%	10.5%	25.7%	2.4%
Era Com	November 11, 2018	27.56%	33.41%	12.21%	26.82%	5.85%
Trend Survey	November 11, 2018	28.8%	33%	14.8%	23.4%	4.2%
Cheng Chao-fang Campaign Team	November 11, 2018	30%	27%	23%	20%	3%
Note：* Opinion polls includes independent candidates.^{1}： Yeh Fang-tung（1.4%）^{2}： Yeh Fang-tung（1%）^{3}： Yeh Fang-tung（1.9%）^{4}： Yeh Fang-tung（0.6%）^{5}： Yeh Fang-tung（2.2%）^{6}： Yeh Fang-tung（1%）^{7}： Yeh Fang-tung（1.4%）^{8}： Yeh Fang-tung（1.3%）
^{Note}: Poll conducted before Lin was withdraw race

Results

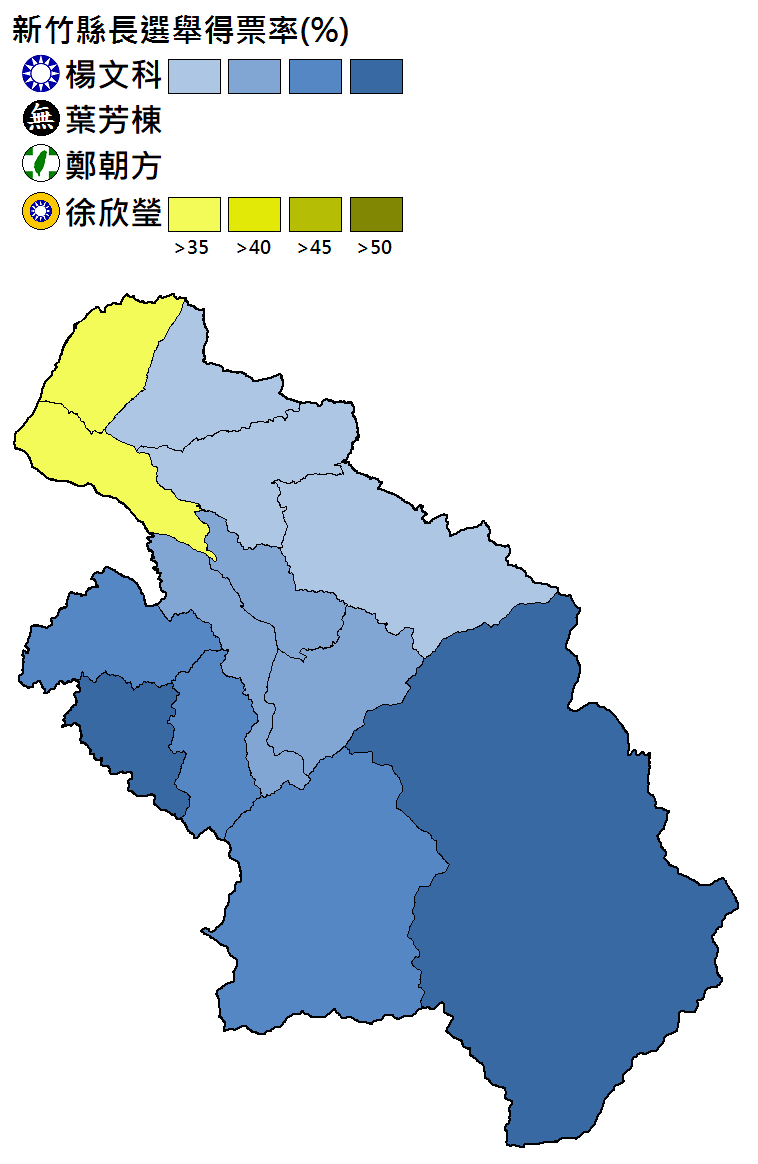

District	Yang Wen-ke		Yeh Fang-tung		Cheng Chao-fang		Hsu Hsin-ying	
District	Votes	%	Votes	%	Votes	%	Votes	%
Zhubei City (竹北市)	27,664	33.50	1,901	2.30	21,725	26.31	31,292	37.89
Zhudong Township (竹東鎮)	19,629	42.05	792	1.70	13,531	28.99	12,724	27.26
Xinpu Township (新埔鎮)	35.99	42.05	317	1.63	6,239	32.16	5,861	30.21
Guanxi Township (關西鎮)	6,017	35.70	217	1.29	4,905	29.10	5,715	33.91
Hukou Township (湖口鎮)	15,866	39.87	702	1.76	10,043	25.24	13,182	33.13
Zhubei City (新豐鄉)	9,826	33.97	475	1.64	7,930	27.42	10,694	36.97
Qionglin Township (芎林鄉)	4,876	40.07	216	1.78	3,702	30.42	3,374	27.73
Hengshan Township (橫山鄉)	3,624	44.23	152	1.86	2,278	27.80	2,140	26.12
Beipu Township (北埔鄉)	2,769	46.27	115	1.92	1,741	29.09	1,359	22.71
Baoshan Township (寶山鄉)	4,172	45.93	133	1.46	2,465	27.14	2,313	25.47
Emei Township (峨眉鄉)	4,876	53.52	57	1.38	1,123	27.10	746	18.00
Jianshi Township (尖石鄉)	2,836	51.39	68	1.23	1,525	27.63	1,090	19.75
Wufeng Township (五峰鄉)	1,398	45.33	23	0.75	963	31.23	700	22.70

2018 Hsinchu County mayoral results
No.	Candidate	Party	Votes	Percentage
1	Yang Wen-ke (楊文科)	Kuomintang	107,877	38.20%
2	Yeh Fang-tung (葉芳棟)	Independent	5,168	1.83%
3	Cheng Chao-fang (鄭朝方)	Democratic Progressive Party	78,170	27.68%
4	Hsu Hsin-ying (徐欣瑩)	Minkuotang	91,190	32.29%
Total voters			427,652	
Valid votes			282,405	
Invalid votes			8,195	
Voter turnout			66.03%	

=== Hsinchu ===
Political context prior to the elections

Results of Past Hsinchu City Mayoral Elections
Year	Winning Candidate	Political Party
1997	James Tsai	Democratic Progressive Party
2001	Lin Junq-tzer	Kuomintang
2005	Lin Junq-tzer	Kuomintang
2009	Hsu Ming-tsai	Kuomintang
2014	Lin Chih-chien	Democratic Progressive Party

Hsinchu City

Highest vote share
Party	Year	Vote share %
Democratic Progressive Party	1997 local election	56%
Kuomintang	2005 local election	69%

2016 election results
Party	Presidential %	Legislative seat	Legislative %
Democratic Progressive Party	51.22%	1	41.33%
Kuomintang	32.42%	0	36.46%
New Power Party	-	0	16.56%
Taiwan Solidarity Union	-	0	-
People First Party	16.35%	0	1.91%
Independent/Others	-	0	3.74%

Results of the primary

2018 Democratic Progressive Party Hsinchu City mayoral primary results
Candidates	Place	Result
Lin Chih-chien	Nominated	Walkover

2018 Kuomintang Hsinchu City mayoral primary results
Candidates	Place	UDN	Apollo Survey & Research	TVBS	Aggregated Result
Hsu Ming-tsai	Nominated	40.55%	42.89%	42.63%	42.02%
Lin Geng-ren	2nd	36.15%	34.63%	34.62%	35.13%
Li Guo-zhang	3rd	23.30%	22.48%	22.75%	22.84%

Opinion polls

Poll organization	Dates conducted	Lin Chih-chien	Hsu Ming-tsai	Hsieh Wen-chin	Not sure	Lead
Trend	November 14, 2017	59.9%	19.8%	-	20.3%	40.1%
Sanli	January 26, 2018	56.4%	23.4%	-	20.2%	33%
ETtoday	March 27, 2018	51.4%	12.0%	-	36.6%	39.4%
GVM	May 30, 2018	59.7%	23.3%	-	20%	36.4%
Green Party	June 20, 2018	40.9%	15.9%	-	20%	25%
Sanli	June 21, 2018	55.5%	15.5%	-	29%	40%
China Times	July 7, 2018	48.4%	15.3%	9.5%	26.8%	33.1%
ETtoday	July 16, 2018	38.5%	16.9%	6.2%	27.1%	21.6%
Taiwan Green Party	August 24, 2018	48.5%	13.6%	7.9%	30%	34.9%
Democratic Progressive Party	September 3, 2018	45.6%	13.2%	9.9%	31.3%	32.4%
Focus Survey Research	October 21, 2018	40.6%	17.1%	14.5%	27.8%	23.5%
Focus Survey Research	November 6, 2018	40.6%	17.6%	13%	28.8%	23%

Results

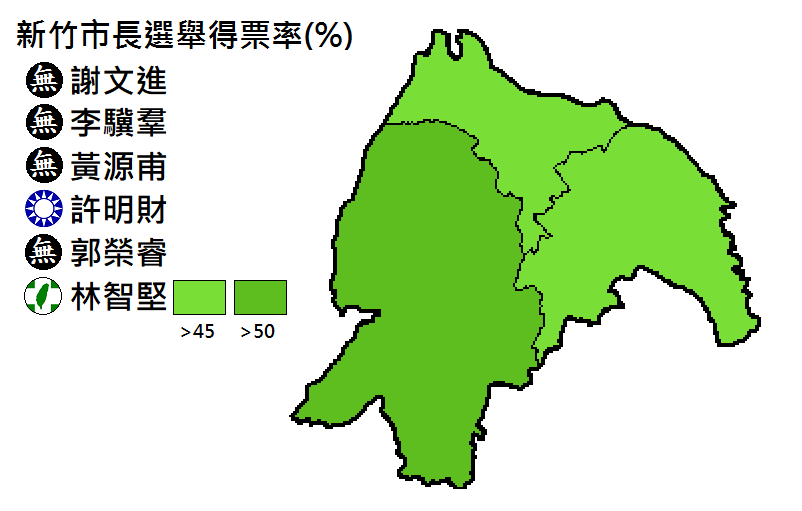

District	Hsieh Wen-chin		Li Chi-qun		Huang Yuan-fu		Hsu Ming-tsai		Kuo Jung-jui		Lin Chih-chien	
District	Votes	%	Votes	%	Votes	%	Votes	%	Votes	%	Votes	%
East District (東區)	19,364	19.45	323	0.32	2,165	2.17	29,097	29.23	261	0.26	48,346	48.56
North District (北區)	17,017	22.39	236	0.31	1,053	1.39	20,850	27.43	195	0.26	36,655	48.23
Xiangshan District (香山區)	7,720	18.58	146	0.35	385	0.93	10,561	25.42	118	0.28	22,611	54.43

2018 Hsinchu City mayoral results
No.	Candidate	Party	Votes	Percentage
1	Hsieh Wen-chin (謝文進)	Independent	44,101	20.31%
2	Li Chi-qun (李驥羣)	Independent	705	0.32%
3	Huang Yuan-fu (黃源甫)	Independent	3,603	1.66%
4	Hsu Ming-tsai (許明財)	Kuomintang	60,508	27.87%
5	Kuo Jung-jui (郭榮睿)	Independent	574	0.26%
6	Lin Chih-chien (林智堅)	Democratic Progressive Party	107,612	49.57%
Total voters			338,323	
Valid votes			217,103	
Invalid votes			4,299	
Voter turnout			64.17%	

=== Miaoli County ===
Political context prior to the elections

Results of Past Miaoli County Magistrate Elections
Year	Winning Candidate	Political Party
1997	Fu Hsueh-peng	Independent
2001	Fu Hsueh-peng	Independent
2005	Liu Cheng-hung	Kuomintang
2009	Liu Cheng-hung	Kuomintang
2014	Hsu Yao-chang	Kuomintang

Miaoli County

2016 election results
Party	Presidential %	Legislative seats	Legislative %
Democratic Progressive Party	45.45%	0	40.44%
Kuomintang	37.55%	2	46.26%
New Power Party	-	0	-
Taiwan Solidarity Union	-	0	-
People First Party	17.00%	0	-
Independent/Others	-	0	13.30%

Results of the primary

2018 Kuomintang Miaoli County magistrate primary results
Candidates	Place	Result
Hsu Yao-chang	Nominated	Walkover

2018 Democratic Progressive Party Miaoli County magistrate primary results
Candidates	Place	Results
Hsu Ting-chen		Supported by DPP

Opinion polls

Poll organization	Dates conducted	Hsu Yao-chang	Hsu Ting-chen	Not sure	Lead
GSSC	January 26, 2018	46.5%	21.1%	32.4%	25.4%
China Times	June 13, 2018	56.9%	17.6%	25.5%	39.3%
ETtoday	July 2, 2018	35.9%	16.5%	29.7%	19.4%
China Times^{1}	November 5, 2018	47.6%	13.2%	37.7%	34.4%
Note：* Opinion polls includes independent candidates.^{1}： Huang Yu-yen（0.1%）, Zhu Tai-ping（0.5%）

Results

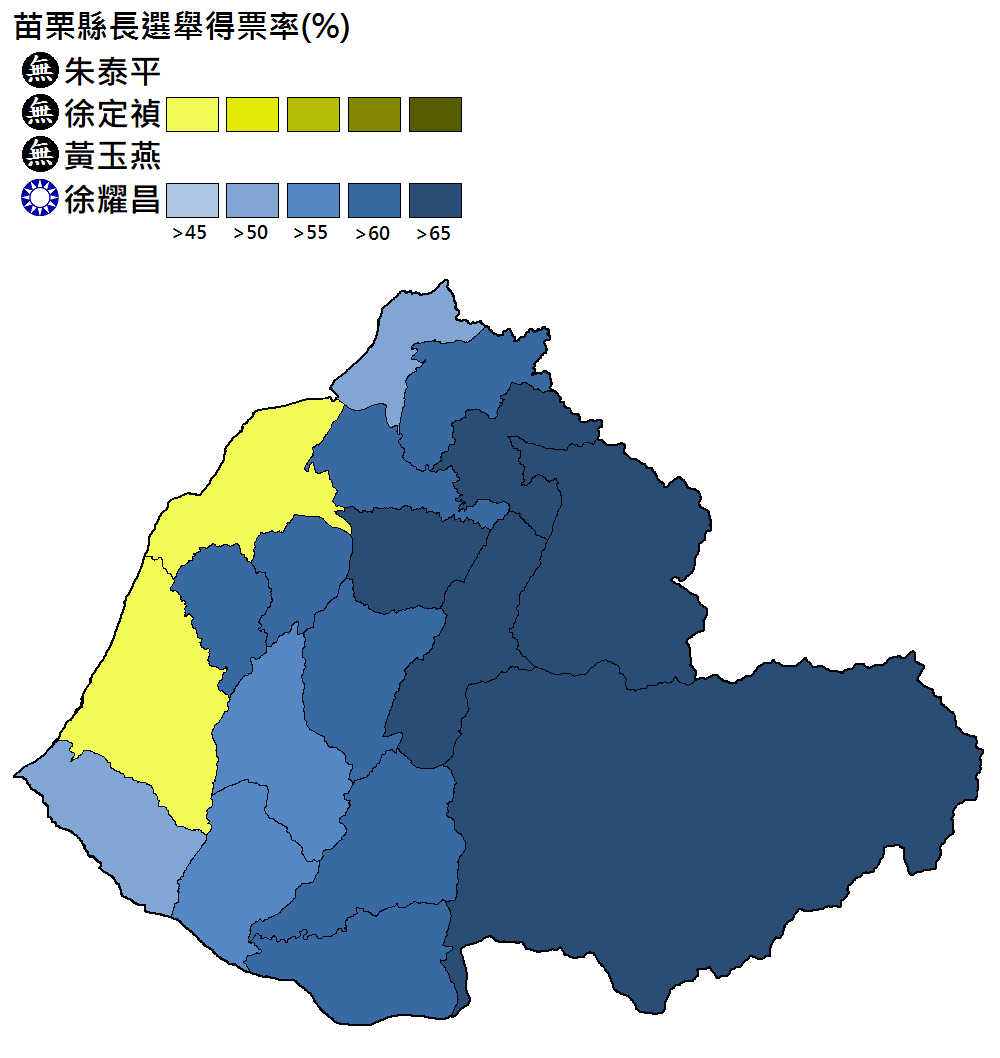

District	Zhu Tai-ping		Hsu Ting-zhen		Huang Yu-yen		Hsu Yao-chang	
District	Votes	%	Votes	%	Votes	%	Votes	%
Miaoli City (苗栗市)	1,070	2.31	15,711	33.92	1,158	2.50	28,376	61.27
Yuanli Township (苑裡鎮)	732	2.81	10,002	38.35	1,023	3.92	14,322	54.92
Tongxiao Township (通霄鎮)	567	2.73	10,375	49.99	841	4.05	8,970	43.22
Zhunan Township (竹南鎮)	1,138	2.70	16,806	39.95	1,342	3.19	22,785	54.16
Toufen City (頭份市)	816	1.57	17,558	33.81	1,421	2.74	32,143	61.89
Houlong Township (後龍鎮)	489	2.29	10,631	49.69	717	3.35	9,556	44.67
Zhuolan Township (卓蘭鎮)	435	4.01	3,315	30.57	378	3.49	6,717	61.94
Dahu Township (大湖鄉)	305	3.50	2,791	32.07	225	2.59	5,382	61.84
Gongguan Township (公館鄉)	362	1.93	6,446	34.28	449	2.39	11,545	61.40
Tongluo Township (銅鑼鄉)	180	1.68	3,894	36.42	286	2.68	6,331	59.22
Nanzhuang Township (南庄鄉)	91	1.51	1,814	30.02	124	2.05	4,014	66.42
Touwu Township (頭屋鄉)	108	1.45	2,307	31.05	151	2.03	4,863	65.46
Sanyi Township (三義鄉)	178	1.80	3,540	35.78	330	3.34	5,845	59.08
Xihu Township (西湖鄉)	72	1.54	1,685	35.95	113	2.41	2,817	60.10
Zaoqiao Township (造橋鄉)	145	1.97	2,561	34.87	194	2.64	4,444	60.51
Sanwan Township (三灣鄉)	62	1.51	1,192	28.97	93	2.26	2,767	67.26
Shitan Township (獅潭鄉)	51	1.74	758	25.85	73	2.49	2,050	69.92
Tai'an Township (泰安鄉)	79	1.82	1,318	30.38	112	2.58	2,829	65.21

2018 Miaoli County mayoral results
No.	Candidate	Party	Votes	Percentage
1	Zhu Tai-ping (朱泰平)	Independent	6,880	2.26%
2	Hsu Ting-zhen (徐定禎)	Independent	112,704	37.03%
3	Huang Yu-yen (黃玉燕)	Independent	9,030	2.97%
4	Hsu Yao-chang (徐耀昌)	Kuomintang	175,756	57.74%
Total voters			446,507	
Valid votes			304,370	
Invalid votes				
Voter turnout			68.17%	

=== Changhua County ===
Political context prior to the elections

Results of Past Changhua County Magistrate Elections
Year	Winning Candidate	Political Party
1997	Juan Kang-meng	Kuomintang
2001	Wong Chin-chu	Democratic Progressive Party
2005	Cho Po-yuan	Kuomintang
2009	Cho Po-yuan	Kuomintang
2014	Wei Ming-ku	Democratic Progressive Party

Changhua County

Highest vote share
Party	Year	Vote share %
Democratic Progressive Party	2016 presidential election	56%
Kuomintang	2008 presidential election	58%

2016 election results
Party	Presidential %	Legislative seats	Legislative %
Democratic Progressive Party	56.47%	3	47.69%
Kuomintang	28.80%	1	44.96%
New Power Party	-	0	0.49%
Taiwan Solidarity Union	-	0	-
People First Party	14.73%	0	2.91%
Independent/Others	-	0	3.95%

Results of the primary

2018 Democratic Progressive Party Changhua County magistrate primary results
Candidates	Place	Result
Wei Ming-ku	Called In	Walkover

2018 Kuomintang Changhua County magistrate primary results
Candidates	Place	TVBS	Apollo Survey & Research	UDN	Aggregated Result
Wang Huei-mei	Nominated	56.66%	59.78%	55.59%	57.34%
Wu Mingzhe	2nd	22.49%	20.99%	26.35%	23.28%
Yang Fu-di	3rd	20.85%	19.23%	18.06%	19.38%

Opinion polls

Poll organization	Dates conducted	Wei Ming-ku	Wang Huei-mei	Not sure	Lead
China Times	April 10, 2017	39.9%	25.7%	34.4%	14.2%
Era Com	January 9, 2018	26.3%	35.9%	33.06%	9.6%
China Times	February 13, 2018	33.6%	28%	38.4%	5.6%
ETtoday	March 13, 2018	31.9%	28.3%	39.8%	3.6%
GSSC	May 24, 2018	25.1%	35.0%	39.9%	9.9%
ETtoday	September 2. 2018	29.6%	29%	26.3%	0.6%
Chienkuo Technology^{1}	September 15. 2018	13.2%	19.9%	33.6%	6.7%
Liberty Times Net^{2}	September 14, 2018	31.3%	30.5%	35.4%	0.8%
UDN^{3}	September 28, 2018	24%	34%	38%	10%
Taiwan Next Gen Foundation^{4}	October 3, 2018	32.3%	31.7%	30%	0.4%
China Times^{5}	October 14, 2018	28.8%	37.7%	26.4%	8.9%
CM Media^{6}	October 16, 2018	34.5%	33.3%	26.2%	1.2%
Taiwan Competitiveness Forum^{7}	October 25, 2018	23.9%	33.4%	35.5%	9.5%
ETtoday^{8}	October 28, 2018	23.2%	38.1%	27.7%	14.9%
UDN^{9}	November 6, 2018	24%	41%	31%	17%
Cross Straits Research Foundation^{10}	November 6, 2018	34.2%	30.9%	28.8%	3.3%
Sanli^{11}	November 6, 2018	35.4%	33.4%	25.3%	2%
Note：* Opinion polls includes independent candidates.^{1}： Huang Wen-ling（4.7%）； Hung Min-xiong（3.2%）^{2}： Huang Wen-ling（2.29%）； Hung Min-xiong（0.3%）； Pai Ya-tsan（0.1%）^{3}： Huang Wen-ling（1%）； Hung Min-xiong（0.1%）； Pai Ya-tsan（0.1%）^{4}： Huang Wen-ling（6%）^{5}： Huang Wen-ling（5.8%）^{6}： Huang Wen-ling（4.8%）； Hung Min-xiong（0.4%）； Pai Ya-tsan（0.1%）^{7}： Huang Wen-ling（2.6%）； Hung Min-xiong（1%）； Pai Ya-tsan（0.6%）^{8}： Huang Wen-ling（4.5%）^{9}： Huang Wen-ling（4%）； Hung Min-xiong（0.3%）； Pai Ya-tsan（1%）^{10}： Huang Wen-ling（6.1%）^{11}： Huang Wen-ling; Others（0.1%）

Results

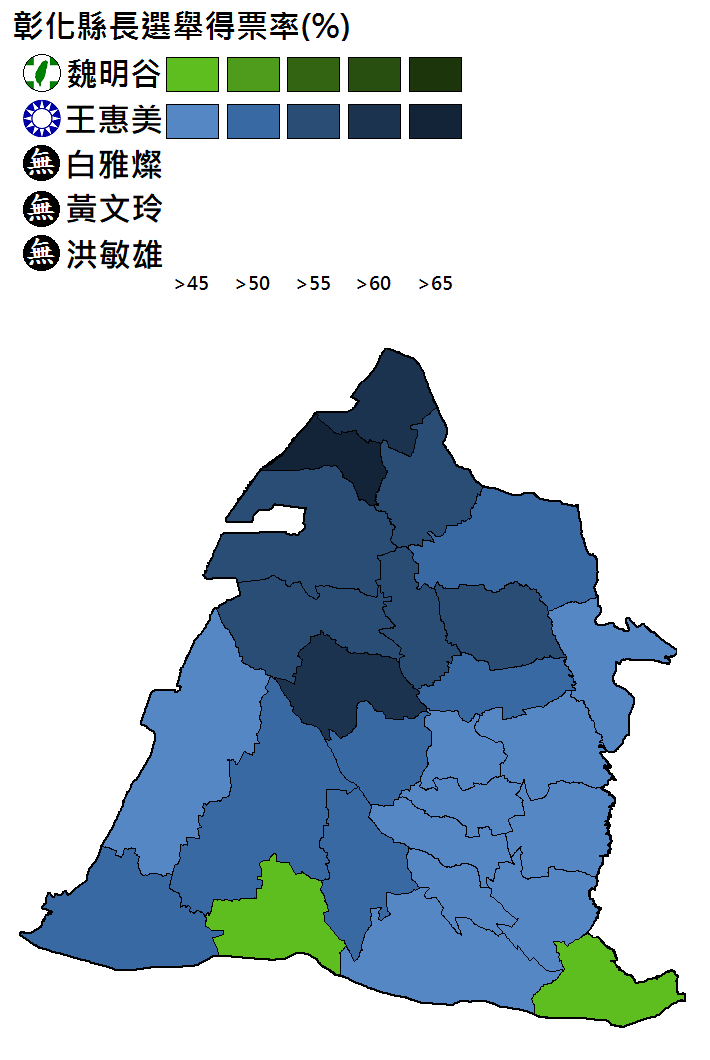

District	Wei Ming-ku		Wang Huei-mei		Pai Ya-tsan		Huang Wen-ling		Hung Min-xiong	
District	Votes	%	Votes	%	Votes	%	Votes	%	Votes	%
Changhua City (彰化市)	47,148	38.02	65,874	53.12	1,375	1.11	8,206	6.62	1,407	1.13
Lugang Township (鹿港鎮)	18,379	38.77	27,397	57.80	266	0.56	1,147	2.42	212	0.45
Hemei Township (和美鎮)	17,596	35.81	29,004	59.03	421	0.85	1,745	3.55	363	0.73
Xianxi Township (線西鄉)	2,818	28.46	6,615	66.82	90	0.91	314	3.17	63	0.64
Shengang Township (伸港鄉)	6,883	33.55	12,781	62.30	135	0.66	615	3.00	101	0.49
Fuxing Township (福興鄉)	9,992	38.08	15,125	57.65	220	0.84	752	2.87	148	0.56
Xiushui Township (秀水鄉)	7,953	35.67	13,132	58.90	173	0.78	836	3.75	203	0.91
Huatan Township (花壇鄉)	9,629	36.90	14,443	55.34	387	1.48	1,366	5.23	273	1.05
Fenyuan Township (芬園鄉)	6,415	46.08	6,594	47.37	119	0.85	669	4.81	124	0.89
Yuanlin City (員林市)	26,724	41.78	31,949	49.95	715	1.12	3,716	5.81	852	1.33
Xihu Township (溪湖鎮)	11,899	38.86	16,431	53.67	284	0.93	1,479	4.83	524	1.71
Tianzhong Township (田中鎮)	10,161	43.96	11,340	49.06	250	1.08	1,136	4.91	228	0.99
Dacun Township (大村鄉)	8,835	41.40	10,826	50.73	235	1.10	1,218	5.71	227	1.06
Puyan Township (埔鹽鄉)	6,620	32.43	12,415	60.82	200	0.98	943	4.62	236	1.16
Puxin Township (埔心鄉)	9,295	45.43	9,694	47.38	195	0.95	1,044	5.10	232	1.13
Yongjing Township (永靖鄉)	9,751	45.35	10,057	46.77	253	1.18	1,188	5.53	252	1.17
Shetou Township (社頭鄉)	10,864	44.60	11,703	48.04	502	2.06	1,094	4.49	196	0.80
Ershui Township (二水鄉)	4,775	49.11	4,452	45.79	78	0.80	357	3.67	61	0.63
Beidou Township (北斗鎮)	7,863	42.83	9,082	49.47	199	1.08	1,013	5.52	202	1.10
Erlin Township (二林鎮)	10,868	37.78	15,652	54.42	349	1.21	1,496	5.20	399	1.39
Tianwei Township (田尾鄉)	6,720	42.16	7,946	49.86	214	1.34	892	5.60	166	1.04
Pitou Township (埤頭鄉)	7,095	42.06	8,548	50.67	191	1.13	852	5.05	183	1.08
Fangyuan Township (芳苑鄉)	8,818	44.80	9,404	47.78	213	1.08	1,005	5.11	241	1.22
Dacheng Township (大城鄉)	4,013	43.29	4,708	50.78	92	0.99	347	3.74	111	1.20
Zhutang Township (竹塘鄉)	4,424	47.20	4,333	46.23	89	0.95	423	4.51	104	1.11
Xizhou Township (溪州鄉)	7,731	45.03	8,290	48.28	157	0.91	837	4.87	155	0.90

2018 Changhua County mayoral results
No.	Candidate	Party	Votes	Percentage
1	Wei Ming-ku (魏明谷)	Democratic Progressive Party	283,269	39.87%
2	Wang Huei-mei (王惠美)	Kuomintang	377,795	53.18%
3	Pai Ya-tsan	Independent	7,402	1.04%
4	Huang Wen-ling (黃文玲)	Independent	34,690	4.88%
5	Hung Min-xiong (洪敏雄)	Independent	7,263	1.02%
Total voters			1,031,222	
Valid votes			710,419	
Invalid votes				
Voter turnout			68.89%	

=== Nantou County ===
Political context prior to the elections

Results of Past Nantou County Magistrate Elections
Year	Winning Candidate	Political Party
1997	Peng Pai-hsien	Independent
2001	Lin Tsung-nan	Democratic Progressive Party
2005	Lee Chao-ching	Kuomintang
2009	Lee Chao-ching	Kuomintang
2014	Lin Ming-chen	Kuomintang

Nantou County

Highest vote share
Party	Year	Vote share %
Democratic Progressive Party	2016 presidential election	52%
Kuomintang	2008 legislative election	62%

2016 election results
Party	Presidential %	Legislative seats	Legislative %
Democratic Progressive Party	52.23%	0	44.24%
Kuomintang	32.08%	2	55.76%
New Power Party	-	0	-
Taiwan Solidarity Union	-	0	-
People First Party	15.68%	0	-
Independent/Others	-	0	-

Results of the primary

2018 Kuomintang Nantou County magistrate primary results
Candidates	Place	Result
Lin Ming-chen	Nominated	Walkover

2018 Democratic Progressive Party Nantou County magistrate primary results
Candidates	Place	Result
Hung Kuo-haw	Called In	Walkover

Opinion polls

Poll organization	Dates conducted	Lin Ming-chen	Hung Kuo-haw	Not sure	Lead
ETtoday	March 13, 2018	59.4%	11.7%	28.9%	47.7%
China Times	March 23, 2018	37.9%	8.9%	53.2%	29%
China Times	October 29, 2018	48.4%	13%	37.6%	35.4%

Results

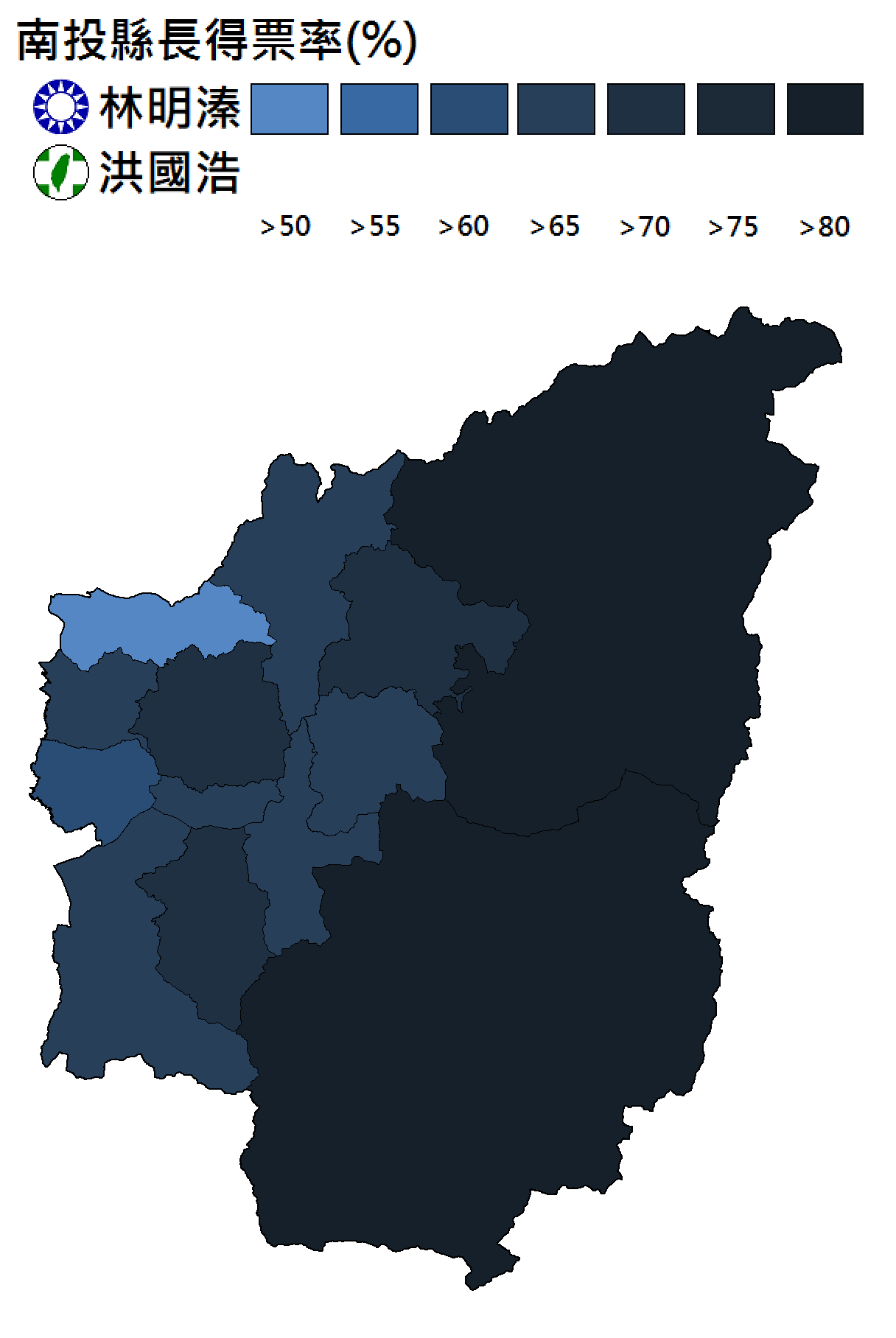

District	Lin Ming-chen		Hung Kuo-haw	
District	Votes	%	Votes	%
Nantou City (南投市)	39,008	68.02	18,342	31.98
Puli Township (埔里鎮)	31,617	70.04	13,527	29.96
Caotun Township (草屯鎮)	29,774	53.79	25,582	46.21
Zhushan Township (竹山鎮)	21,162	68.00	9,960	32.00
Jiji Township (集集鎮)	4,774	68.63	2,182	31.37
Mingjian Township (名間鄉)	15,432	64.75	8,400	35.25
Lugu Township (鹿谷鄉)	8,156	72.48	3,096	27.52
Zhongliao Township (中寮鄉)	6,940	70.31	2,931	29.69
Yuchi Township (魚池鄉)	6,810	68.99	3,061	31.01
Guoxing Township (魚池鄉)	8,152	68.21	3,799	31.79
Shuili Township (水里鄉)	7,621	69.89	3,284	30.11
Xinyi Township (信義鄉)	7,902	80.96	1,858	19.04
Ren'ai Township (仁愛鄉)	8,037	84.82	1,438	15.18

2018 Nantou County mayoral results
No.	Candidate	Party	Votes	Percentage
1	Lin Ming-chen (林明溱)	Kuomintang	195,385	66.72%
2	Hung Kuo-hao (洪國浩)	Democratic Progressive Party	97,460	33.28%
Total voters			413,222	
Valid votes			292,845	
Invalid votes				
Voter turnout			70.87%	

=== Yunlin County ===
Political context prior to the elections

Results of Past Yunlin County Magistrate Elections
Year	Winning Candidate	Political Party
1997	Chang Jung-wei	Independent -> Kuomintang
2001	Chang Jung-wei	Kuomintang
2005	Su Chih-fen	Democratic Progressive Party
2009	Su Chih-fen	Democratic Progressive Party
2014	Lee Chin-yung	Democratic Progressive Party

Yunlin County

Highest vote share
Party	Year	Vote share %
Democratic Progressive Party	2009 local elections	65%
Kuomintang	2001 local elections	62%

2016 election results
Party	Presidential %	Legislative seats	Legislative %
Democratic Progressive Party	63.41%	2	61.27%
Kuomintang	24.93%	0	34.12%
New Power Party	-	0	2.13%
Taiwan Solidarity Union	-	0	-
People First Party	11.66%	0	-
Independent/Others	-	0	2.48%

Results of the primary

2018 Democratic Progressive Party Yunlin County magistrate primary results
Candidates	Place	Result
Lee Chin-yung	Nominated	Walkover

2018 Kuomintang Yunlin County magistrate primary results
Candidates	Place	Result
Chang Li-shan	Called In	Walkover

Opinion polls

Poll organization	Dates conducted	Lee Chin-yung	Chang Li-shan	Not sure	Lead
ETtoday	May 21, 2018	32.8%	19.6%	47.6%	13.2%
Taiwan Competitiveness Forum^{1}	October 17, 2018	32.6%	25.3%	35.8%	7.3%
Taiwan Competitiveness Forum^{2}	November 2, 2018	30.3%	28%	35.9%	2.3%
Note：* Opinion polls includes independent candidates.^{1}： Lin Chia-yu（1.7%）； Wang Li-ping（0.9%）^{2}： Lin Chia-yu（1.4%）； Wang Li-ping（1.7%）

Results

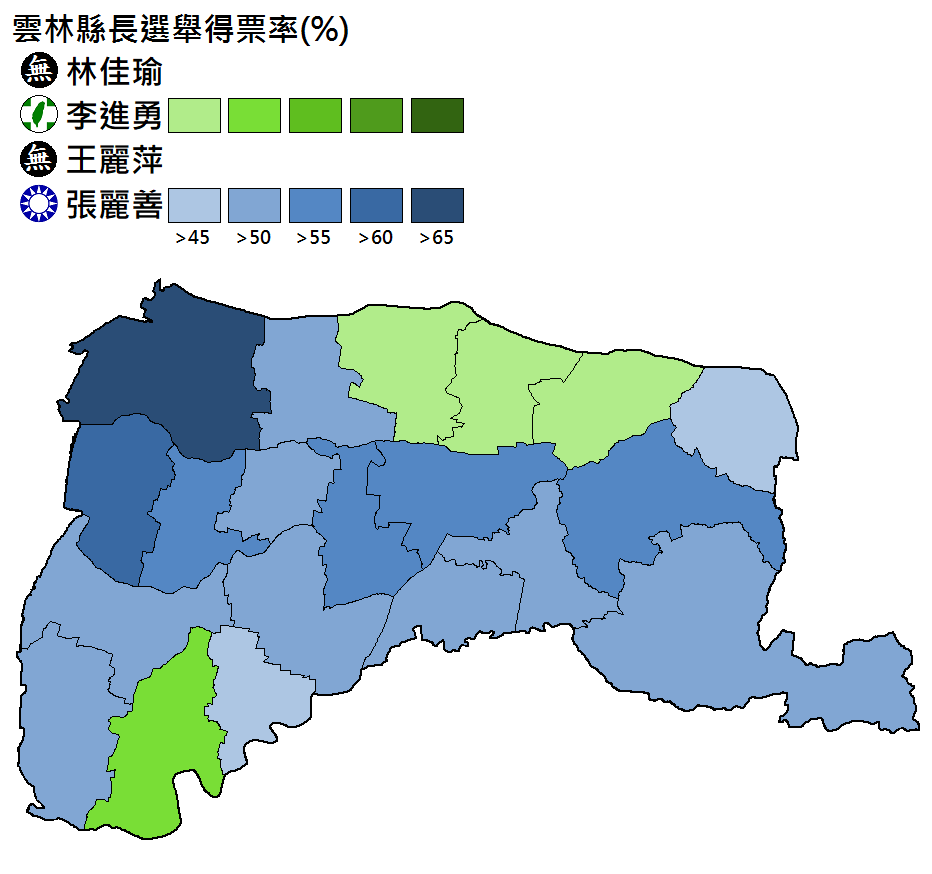

District	Lin Chia-yu		Lee Chin-yung		Wang Li-ping		Chang Li-shan	
District	Votes	%	Votes	%	Votes	%	Votes	%
Douliu City (斗六市)	1,055	1.81	22,922	39.39	2,161	3.71	32,050	55.08
Dounan Township (斗南鎮)	475	1.84	11,005	42.61	901	3.49	13,445	52.06
Huwei Township (虎尾鎮)	743	1.95	14,381	37.68	1,697	4.45	21,349	55.93
Xiluo Township (西螺鎮)	392	1.52	12,644	48.96	679	2.63	12,109	46.89
Tuku Township (土庫鎮)	275	1.58	6,368	36.69	578	3.33	10,136	58.40
Beigang Township (北港鎮)	334	1.44	10,941	47.13	514	2.21	11,426	49.22
Gukeng Township (古坑鄉)	283	1.52	7,693	41.45	496	2.67	10,087	54.35
Dapi Township (大埤鄉)	190	1.62	4,860	41.37	359	3.06	6,339	53.96
Cihtong Township (莿桐鎮)	323	1.84	8,445	48.24	521	2.98	8,218	46.94
Linnei Township (林內鄉)	125	1.19	4,928	46.72	260	2.47	5,234	49.63
Erlun Township (二崙鄉)	240	1.52	7,708	48.78	392	2.48	7,461	47.22
Lunbei Township (崙背鄉)	209	1.44	5,987	41.25	357	2.46	7,961	54.85
Mailiao Township (麥寮鄉)	340	1.49	6,429	28.12	542	2.37	15,550	68.02
Dongshi Township (東勢鄉)	117	1.18	3,902	39.49	174	1.76	5,687	57.56
Baozhong Township (褒忠鄉)	100	1.15	3,638	41.81	217	2.49	4,746	54.55
Taixi Township (臺西鄉)	175	1.26	4,600	33.11	283	2.04	8,833	63.59
Yuanchang Township (元長鄉)	267	1.75	6,483	42.41	418	2.73	8,118	53.11
Sihu Township (四湖鄉)	118	0.95	5,728	46.04	212	1.70	6,384	51.31
Kouhu Township (口湖鄉)	195	1.20	7,059	43.50	236	1.45	8,739	53.85
Shuilin Township (水林鄉)	207	1.38	7,604	50.78	264	1.76	6,898	46.07

2018 Yunlin County mayoral results
No.	Candidate	Party	Votes	Percentage
1	Lin Chia-yu (林佳瑜)	Independent	6,163	1.57%
2	Lee Chin-yung (李進勇)	Democratic Progressive Party	163,325	41.72%
3	Wang Li-ping (王麗萍)	Independent	11,261	2.88%
4	Chang Li-shan (張麗善)	Kuomintang	210,770	53.82%
Total voters			565,078	
Valid votes			391,519	
Invalid votes				
Voter turnout			69.29%	

=== Chiayi County ===
Political context prior to the elections

Results of Past Chiayi County Magistrate Elections
Year	Winning Candidate	Political Party
1997	Lee Ya-jing	Kuomintang
2001	Chen Ming-wen	Democratic Progressive Party
2005	Chen Ming-wen	Democratic Progressive Party
2009	Helen Chang	Democratic Progressive Party
2014	Helen Chang	Democratic Progressive Party

Chiayi County

Highest vote share
Party	Year	Vote share %
Democratic Progressive Party	2016 presidential election	65%
Kuomintang	2008 legislative election	50%

2016 election results
Party	Presidential %	Legislative seats	Legislative %
Democratic Progressive Party	65.37%	2	59.05%
Kuomintang	23.38%	0	38.68%
New Power Party	-	0	-
Taiwan Solidarity Union	-	0	-
People First Party	11.25%	0	-
Independent/Others	-	0	2.27%

Results of the primary

2018 Democratic Progressive Party Chiayi County magistrate primary results
Candidates	Place	Focus Survey Research	Shih Shin	Real Survey	Aggregated Result
Weng Chang-liang	Nominated	43.08%	42.88%	45.34%	43.77%
Chang Ming-ta	2nd	35.57%	36.73%	33.79%	35.36%
None of the candidates		21.35%	20.39%	20.87%	20.87%

2018 Kuomintang Chiayi County magistrate primary results
Candidates	Place	Result
Wu Yu-jen	Called In	Walkover

Opinion polls

Poll organization	Date of completion	Weng Chang-liang	Wu Yu-jen	Not sure	Lead
ETtoday	June 4, 2018	34.3%	15.3%	50.4%	19%
ETtoday	September 24, 2018	29.3%	22.8%	32.4%	6.5%
Note：* Opinion polls includes independent candidates.^{1}： Wu Fang-ming（5%）; Lin Kuo-lung（2.6%）

Results

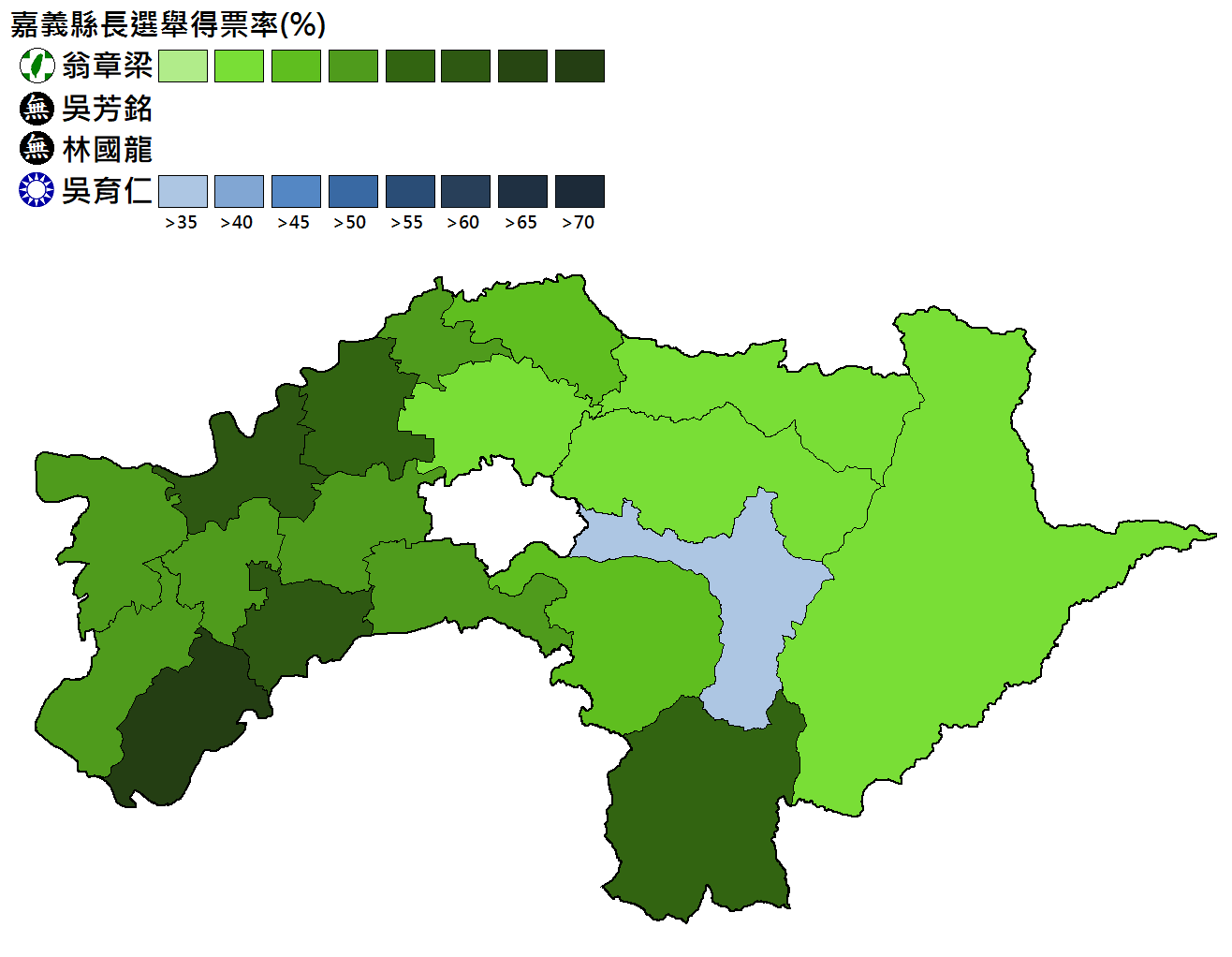

District	Weng Chang-liang		Wu Fang-ming		Lin Kuo-lung		Wu Yu-jen	
District	Votes	%	Votes	%	Votes	%	Votes	%
Taibao City (太保市)	10,506	51.80	3,395	16.73	288	1.42	6,092	30.03
Puzi City (朴子市)	11,907	53.76	3,655	16.50	405	1.82	6,178	27.89
Budai Township (布袋鎮)	8,244	54.46	1,569	10.36	269	1.77	5,053	33.38
Dalin Township (大林鎮)	7,976	45.34	3,945	22.42	242	1.37	5,426	30.84
Minxiong Township (民雄鄉)	17,016	44.72	8,246	21.67	645	1.69	12,139	31.90
Xikou Township (溪口鄉)	4,932	54.42	1,820	20.08	211	2.32	2,099	23.16
Xingang Township (新港鄉)	10,986	58.72	3,095	16.54	329	1.75	4,298	22.97
Lioujiao Township (六腳鄉)	7,675	60.65	1,740	13.75	250	1.97	2,989	23.62
Dongshi Township (東石鄉)	7,275	54.97	2,532	19.13	234	1.76	3,193	24.12
Yizhu Township (義竹鄉)	8,500	70.92	938	7.82	132	1.10	2,414	20.14
Lucao Township (鹿草鄉)	5,411	60.44	844	9.42	152	1.69	2,545	28.42
Shuishang Township (水上鄉)	13,968	50.44	3,529	12.74	458	1.65	9,734	35.15
Zhongpu Township (中埔鄉)	11,500	48.73	4,038	17.11	308	1.30	7,751	32.84
Zhuqi Township (竹崎鄉)	8,791	42.07	5,467	26.16	334	1.59	6,300	30.15
Meishan Township (梅山鄉)	5,175	43.22	3,197	26.70	164	1.36	3,437	28.70
Fanlu Township (番路鄉)	2,253	32.65	2,036	29.51	100	1.44	2,510	36.38
Dapu Township (大埔鄉)	1,724	56.06	397	12.91	35	1.13	919	29.88
Alishan Township (阿里山鄉)	1,449	44.83	577	17.85	40	1.23	1,166	36.07

2018 Chiayi County mayoral results
No.	Candidate	Party	Votes	Percentage
1	Weng Chang-liang (翁章梁)	Democratic Progressive Party	145,288	50.95%
2	Wu Fang-ming (吳芳銘)	Independent	51,020	17.89%
3	Lin Kuo-lung (林國龍)	Independent	4,596	1.61%
4	Wu Yu-jen (吳育仁)	Kuomintang	84,243	29.54%
Total voters			428,649	
Valid votes			285,147	
Invalid votes				
Voter turnout			66.52%	

=== Chiayi City ===
Political context prior to the elections

Results of Past Chiayi City Magistrate Elections
Year	Winning Candidate	Political Party
1997	Chang Po-ya	Independent
2001	Chen Li-chen	Independent
2005	Huang Min-hui	Kuomintang
2009	Huang Min-hui	Kuomintang
2014	Twu Shiing-jer	Democratic Progressive Party

Chiayi City

Highest vote share
Party	Year	Vote share %
Democratic Progressive Party	2016 presidential election	60%
Kuomintang	2005 local election	55%

2016 election results
Party	Presidential %	Legislative seat	Legislative %
Democratic Progressive Party	59.86%	1	53.95%
Kuomintang	27.95%	0	35.66%
New Power Party	-	0	-
Taiwan Solidarity Union	-	0	-
People First Party	12.19%	0	-
Independent/Others	-	0	10.39%

Results of the primary

2018 Democratic Progressive Party Chiayi City mayoral primary results
Candidates	Place	Result
Twu Shiing-jer	Nominated	Walkover

2018 Kuomintang Chiayi City mayoral primary results
Candidates	Place	Results
Huang Min-hui	Nominated	Results not released
Jack Lee	2nd	Results not released

Opinion polls

Poll organization	Dates conducted	Twu Shiing-jer	Huang Min-hui	Hsiao Shu-li	Not sure	Lead
Yam News	September 27, 2017	50.91%	49.09%	-	0%	1.82%
Era Com	January 15, 2018	22.08%	53.23%	-	24.69%	31.15%
GSSC	April 27, 2018	21.9%	34.4%	15.1%	28.6%	12.5%
ETtoday	June 4, 2018	18.2%	31.2%	18.0%	32.6%	13%
CM Media	September 5, 2018	39.5%	24.8%	18.9%	17%	15.3%
ETtoday^{1}	September 16, 2018	26.0%	35.4%	10.7%	18.6%	9.4%
Liberty News Net^{2}	September 29, 2018	30.14%	24.56%	17.91%	27.1%	5.58%
UDN^{3}	October 2, 2018	25%	28%	17%	29%	3%
TVBS^{4}	October 15, 2018	29%	35%	15%	20%	6%
Taiwan Competitiveness Forum^{5}	October 25, 2018	25.6%	28%	15.3%	26.0%	2.4%
Taiwan Competitiveness Forum^{6}	November 4, 2018	26.5%	28.8%	13.2%	25.9%	2.3%
UDN^{7}	November 7, 2018	28%	31%	15%	24%	3%
Note：* Opinion polls includes independent candidates.^{1}： Huang Hung Chen Taiwan Ah Chen World Great Person Rich President（3.0%）^{2}： Huang Hung Chen Taiwan Ah Chen World Great Person Rich President（0.29%）^{3}： Huang Hung Chen Taiwan Ah Chen World Great Person Rich President（1%）^{4}： Huang Hung Chen Taiwan Ah Chen World Great Person Rich President（1%）^{5}： Huang Hung Chen Taiwan Ah Chen World Great Person Rich President（1.4%）^{6}： Huang Hung Chen Taiwan Ah Chen World Great Person Rich President（1.6%）^{7}： Huang Hung Chen Taiwan Ah Chen World Great Person Rich President（2%）

Predictions

Poll organization	Date of completion	Turnout	Twu Shiing-jer	Huang Min-hui	Hsiao Shu-li	Huang Hung Chen Taiwan Ah Chen World Great Person Rich President
TVBS	October 15, 2018	70%	41%	40%	15%	1%

Results

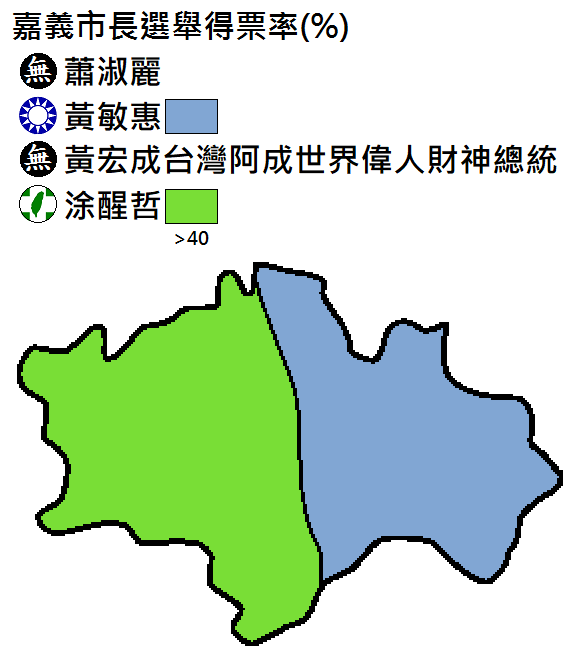

District	Hsiao Shui-li		Huang Min-hui		Huang Hung Chen Taiwan Ah Chen World Great Person Rich President		Twu Shiing-jer	
District	Votes	%	Votes	%	Votes	%	Votes	%
East District (東區)	10,703	16.95	27,558	43.64	806	1.28	24,081	38.13
West District (西區)	14,869	0.40	31,000	39.21	1,016	1.29	32,175	40.70

2018 Chiayi City mayoral results
No.	Candidate	Party	Votes	Percentage
1	Hsiao Shui-li (蕭淑麗)	Independent	25,572	17.98%
2	Huang Min-hui (黃敏惠)	Kuomintang	58,558	41.18%
3	Huang Hung Chen Taiwan Ah Chen World Great Person Rich President (黃宏成台灣阿成 世界偉人財神總統)	Independent	1,822	1.28%
4	Twu Shiing-jer (涂醒哲)	Democratic Progressive Party	56,256	39.56%
Total voters			212,843	
Valid votes			142,208	
Invalid votes				
Voter turnout			66.81%	

=== Pingtung County ===
Political context prior to the elections

Results of Past Pingtung County Magistrate Elections
Year	Winning Candidate	Political Party
1997	Su Jia-chyuan	Democratic Progressive Party
2001	Su Jia-chyuan	Democratic Progressive Party
2005	Tsao Chi-hung	Democratic Progressive Party
2009	Tsao Chi-hung	Democratic Progressive Party
2014	Pan Men-an	Democratic Progressive Party

Pingtung County

Highest vote share
Party	Year	Vote share %
Democratic Progressive Party	2016 presidential election	63%
Kuomintang	2008 presidential election	49%

2016 election results
Party	Presidential %	Legislative seats	Legislative %
Democratic Progressive Party	63.49%	3	58.94%
Kuomintang	26.99%	0	30.89%
New Power Party	-	0	-
Taiwan Solidarity Union	-	0	-
People First Party	9.52%	0	-
Independent/Others	-	0	10.17%

Results of the primary

2018 Democratic Progressive Party Pingtung County magistrate primary results
Candidates	Place	Result
Pan Men-an	Nominated	Walkover

2018 Kuomintang Pingtung County magistrate primary results
Candidates	Place	Result
Su Ching-chuan	Called In	Walkover

Opinion polls

Poll organization	Date of completion	Pan Men-an	Su Ching-chuan	Not sure	Lead
ETtoday	June 19, 2018	37.9%	20.9%	29.9%	17%
ETtoday^{1}	September 30, 2017	36.4%	24.8%	22.5%	11.6%
TISR^{2}	October 22, 2018	43.4%	17.1%	33.1%	26.3%
TISR^{2}	November 10, 2018	41.6%	19.3%	33.4%	22.3%
Note：* Opinion polls includes independent candidates.^{1}： Lee Jung-jen（4.5%）^{2}： Lee Jung-jen（1.5%）^{3}： Lee Jung-jen（0.7%）

Results

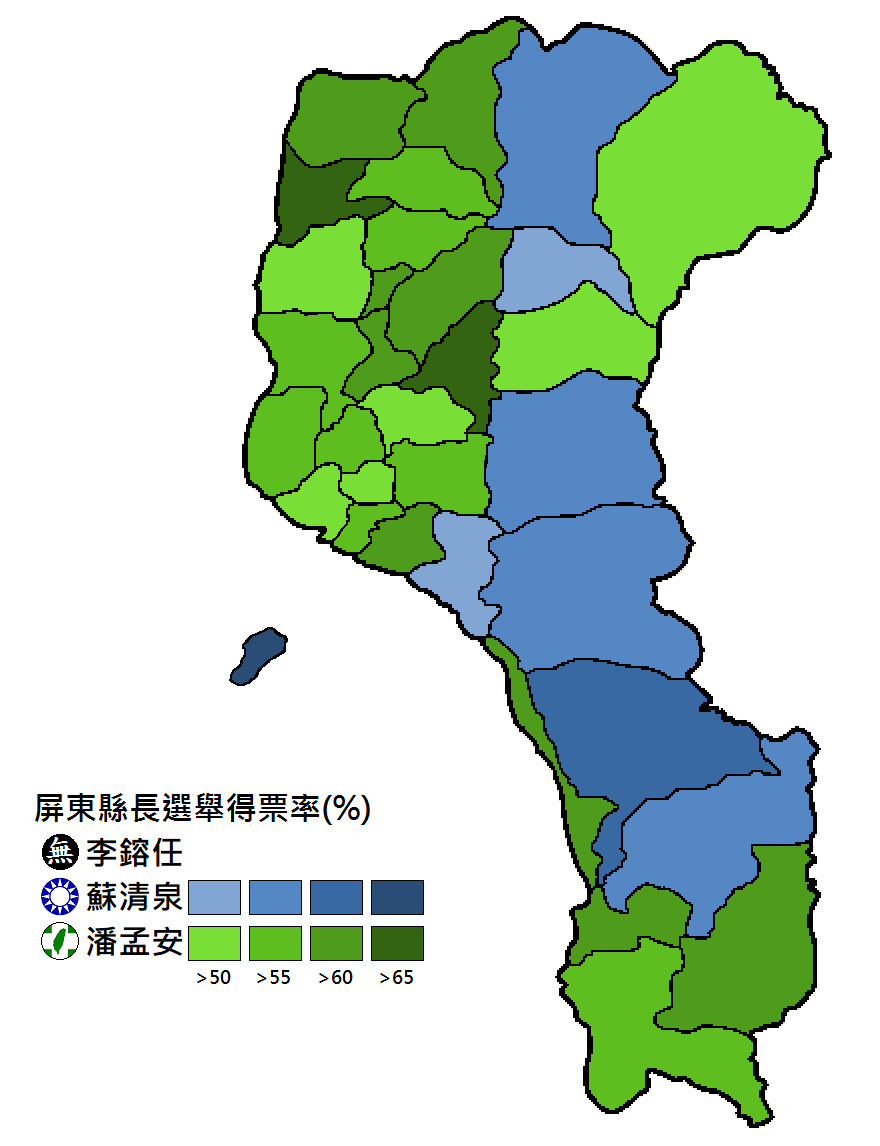

District	Lee Jung-jen		Su Ching-chuan		Pan Men-an	
District	Votes	%	Votes	%	Votes	%
Pingtung City (屏東市)	2,182	2.14	46,320	45.47	53,370	52.39
Chaozhou Township (潮州鎮)	623	2.16	12,571	43.62	15,628	54.22
Donggang Township (東港鎮)	575	2.38	11,387	47.04	12,243	50.58
Hengchun Township (恆春鎮)	232	1.40	6,729	40.55	9,632	58.05
Wandan Township (萬丹鄉)	825	2.84	11,272	38.87	16,905	58.29
Changzhi Township (長治鄉)	381	2.20	6,939	40.05	10,006	57.75
Linluo Township (麟洛鄉)	160	2.25	2,526	35.45	4,440	62.31
Jiuru Township (九如鄉)	294	2.22	3,977	30.03	8,972	67.75
Ligang Township (里港鄉)	393	2.54	5,371	34.75	9,692	62.71
Yanpu Township (鹽埔鄉)	387	2.43	6,561	41.20	8,977	56.37
Gaoshu Township (高樹鄉)	347	2.22	5,402	34.53	9,897	63.26
Wanluan Township (萬巒鄉)	198	1.61	3,866	31.41	8,245	66.98
Neipu Township (內埔鄉)	539	1.86	10,697	36.84	17,799	61.30
Zhutian Township (竹田鄉)	216	1.94	4,040	36.23	6,894	61.83
Xinpi Township (新埤鄉)	100	1.55	2,663	41.34	3,678	57.10
Fangliao Township (枋寮鄉)	308	2.03	7,635	50.44	7,194	47.53
Xinyuan Township (新園鄉)	523	2.52	8,167	39.28	12,100	58.20
Kanding Township (崁頂鄉)	155	1.87	3,219	38.80	4,923	59.33
Linbian Township (林邊鄉)	193	1.71	4,376	38.84	6,699	59.45
Nanzhou Township (南州鄉)	159	2.25	3,024	42.84	3,876	54.91
Jiadong Township (佳冬鄉)	165	1.39	4,432	37.29	7,288	61.32
Liqiu Township (琉球鄉)	116	1.69	4,763	69.26	1,998	29.05
Checheng Township (車城鄉)	74	1.40	1,786	33.67	3,444	64.93
Manzhou Township (滿州鄉)	89	1.68	1,994	37.68	3,209	60.64
Fangshan Township (枋山鄉)	72	1.85	1,385	35.63	2,430	62.52
Sandimen Township (三地門鄉)	85	1.65	2,895	56.14	2,177	42.21
Wutai Township (霧臺鄉)	46	1.85	1,129	45.34	1,315	52.81
Majia Township (瑪家鄉)	65	1.42	2,350	51.40	2,157	47.18
Taiwu Township (泰武鄉)	42	1.17	1,668	46.62	1,868	52.21
Laiyi Township (來義鄉)	64	1.35	2,673	56.24	2,016	42.42
Chunri Township (春日鄉)	71	2.35	1,737	57.38	1,219	40.27
Shizi Township (獅子鄉)	72	2.10	2,192	64.02	1,160	33.88
Mudan Township (牡丹鄉)	68	2.13	1,772	55.41	1,358	42.46

2018 Pingtung County mayoral results
No.	Candidate	Party	Votes	Percentage
1	Lee Jung-jen (李鎔任)	Independent	9,819	2.09%
2	Su Ching-chuan (蘇清泉)	Kuomintang	197,518	42.01%
3	Pan Men-an (潘孟安)	Democratic Progressive Party	262,809	55.90%
Total voters			689,393	
Valid votes			470,146	
Invalid votes				
Voter turnout			68.20%	

=== Hualien County ===
Political context prior to the elections

Results of Past Hualien County Magistrate Elections
Year	Winning Candidate	Political Party
1997	Chang Fu-hsin	Kuomintang
2001	Chang Fu-hsin	Kuomintang
2005	Hsieh Shen-shan	Kuomintang
2009	Fu Kun-chi	Independent
2014	Fu Kun-chi	Independent

Hualien County

Highest vote share
Party	Year	Vote share %
Democratic Progressive Party	2016 legislative election	53%
Kuomintang	2008 presidential election	77%

2016 election results
Party	Presidential %	Legislative seat	Legislative %
Democratic Progressive Party	36.94%	1	53.77%
Kuomintang	47.72%	0	43.58%
New Power Party	-	0	-
Taiwan Solidarity Union	-	0	-
People First Party	15.34%	0	-
Independent/Others	-	0	2.65%

Results of the primary

2018 Kuomintang Hualien County magistrate primary results
Candidates	Place	Result
Hsu Chen-wei	Called In	Walkover

2018 Democratic Progressive Party Hualien County magistrate primary results
Candidates	Place	Result
Liu Siao-Mei	Called In	Walkover

Opinion polls

Poll organization	Dates conducted	Hsu Chen-wei	Liu Siao-Mei	Not sure	Lead
China Times	March 25, 2018	40.1%	17.0%	42.9%	23.1%
ETtoday	June 13, 2018	44.4%	19.0%	36.6%	25.4%

Results

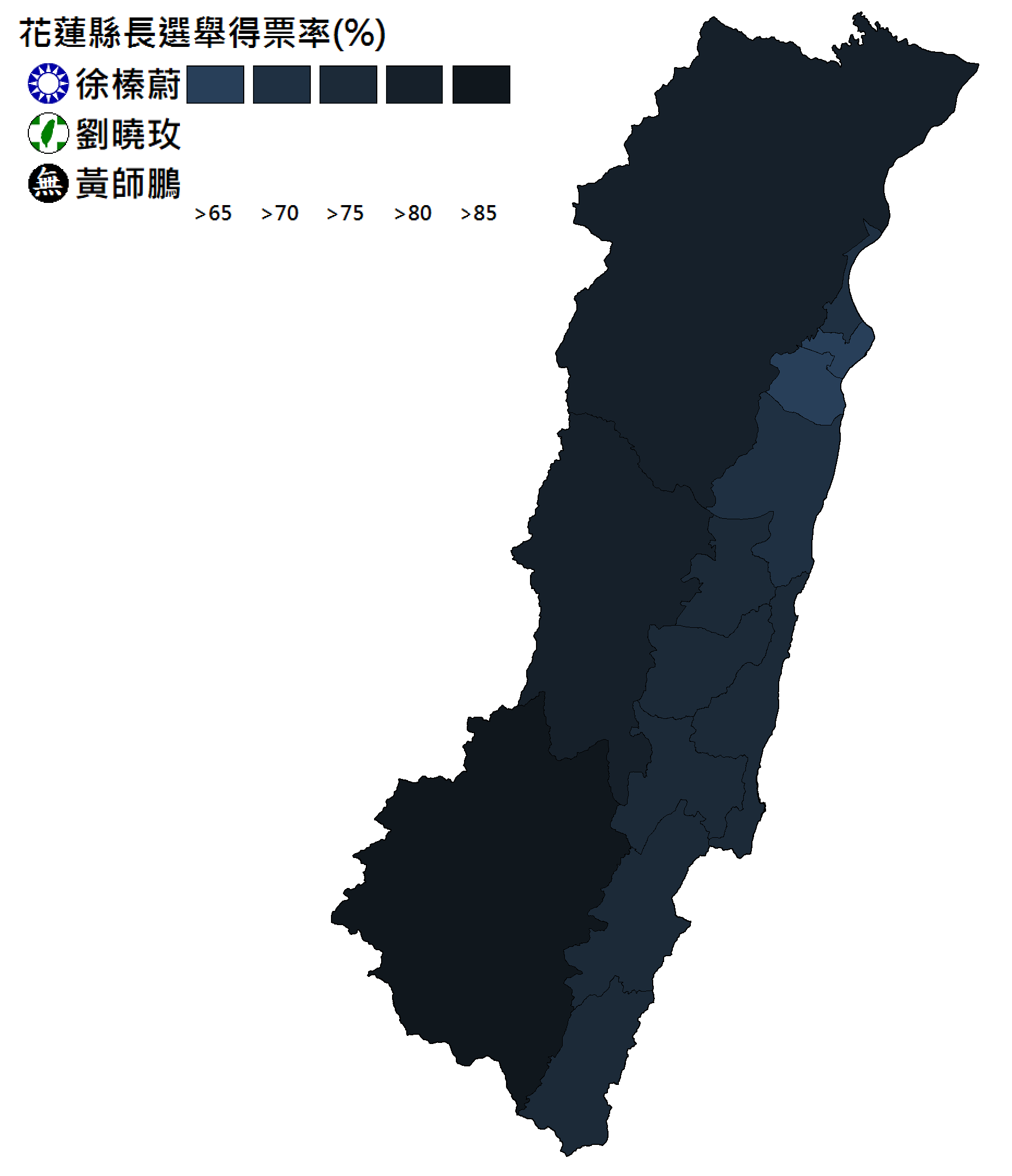

District	Hsu Chen-wei		Liu Siao-Mei		Huang Shih-peng	
District	Votes	%	Votes	%	Votes	%
Hualien City (花蓮市)	32,399	65.99	15,065	30.68	1,635	3.33
Fenglin Township (鳳林鎮)	4,991	76.26	1,418	21.67	136	2.08
Yuli Township (玉里鎮)	9,193	76.13	2,646	21.91	237	1.96
Xincheng Township (新城鄉)	7,551	71.41	2,716	25.69	307	2.90
Ji'an Township (吉安鄉)	28,510	68.51	11,845	28.46	1,260	3.03
Shoufeng Township (壽豐鄉)	7,438	71.53	2,732	26.27	229	2.20
Guangfu Township (光復鄉)	5,830	77.36	1,553	20.61	153	2.03
Fengbin Township (豐濱鄉)	2,471	77.70	629	19.78	80	2.52
Ruisui Township (瑞穗鄉)	5,010	75.78	1,487	22.49	114	1.72
Fuli Township (富里鄉)	4,628	77.81	1,229	20.66	91	1.53
Xiulin Township (秀林鄉)	7,074	80.55	1,629	18.55	79	0.90
Wanrong Township (萬榮鄉)	3,205	83.70	567	14.81	57	1.49
Zuoxi Township (卓溪鄉)	2,997	88.10	363	10.67	42	1.23

2018 Hualien County mayoral results
No.	Candidate	Party	Votes	Percentage
1	Hsu Chen-wei (徐榛蔚)	Kuomintang	121,297	71.52%
2	Liu Siao-Mei (劉曉玫)	Democratic Progressive Party	43,879	25.87%
3	Huang Shih-peng (黃師鵬)	Independent	4,420	2.61%
Total voters			268,817	
Valid votes			169,596	
Invalid votes				
Voter turnout			63.09%	

=== Taitung County ===
Political context prior to the elections

Results of Past Taitung County Magistrate Elections
Year	Winning Candidate	Political Party
1997	Chen Jen-nian	Kuomintang
2001	Hsu Ching-yuan	People First Party
2005	Wu Chun-li	Independent
2006	Kuang Li-chen	Kuomintang
2009	Justin Huang	Kuomintang
2014	Justin Huang	Kuomintang

Taitung County

Highest vote share
Party	Year	Vote share %
Democratic Progressive Party	2016 legislative election	64%
Kuomintang	2008 presidential election	73%

2016 election results
Party	Presidential %	Legislative seat	Legislative %
Democratic Progressive Party	38.41%	1	64.18%
Kuomintang	44.62%	0	35.82%
New Power Party	-	0	-
Taiwan Solidarity Union	-	0	-
People First Party	16.96%	0	-
Independent/Others	-	0	-

Results of the primary

2018 Democratic Progressive Party Taitung County magistrate primary results
Candidates	Place	Result
Liu Chao-hao	Called In	Walkover

2018 Kuomintang Taitung County magistrate primary results
Candidates	Place	Results
Rao Ching-ling	Nominated	Results not released
Liao Kuo-tung	2nd	Results not released

Opinion polls

Poll organization	Dates conducted	Rao Ching-ling	Liu Chao-hao	Not sure	Lead
ETtoday	June 22, 2018	34.1%	27.8%	38.1%	6.3%
China Times	October 2, 2018	38.6%	30.3%	27.8%	8.3%
TVBS^{2}	October 10, 2018	40%	31%	24%	9%
ETtoday^{3}	October 21, 2018	36.7%	25.9%	23.1%	9%
Note：* Opinion polls includes independent candidates.^{1}： Kuang Li-zhen（3.3%）; Peng Chuan-kuo（1.0%）; Huang Yu-pin（0.0%） ^{2}： Kuang Li-zhen（5%）; Peng Chuan-kuo（0.2%）; Huang Yu-pin（1.0%）^{3}： Kuang Li-zhen（4.6%）; Peng Chuan-kuo（4%）; Huang Yu-pin（1.3%）

Results

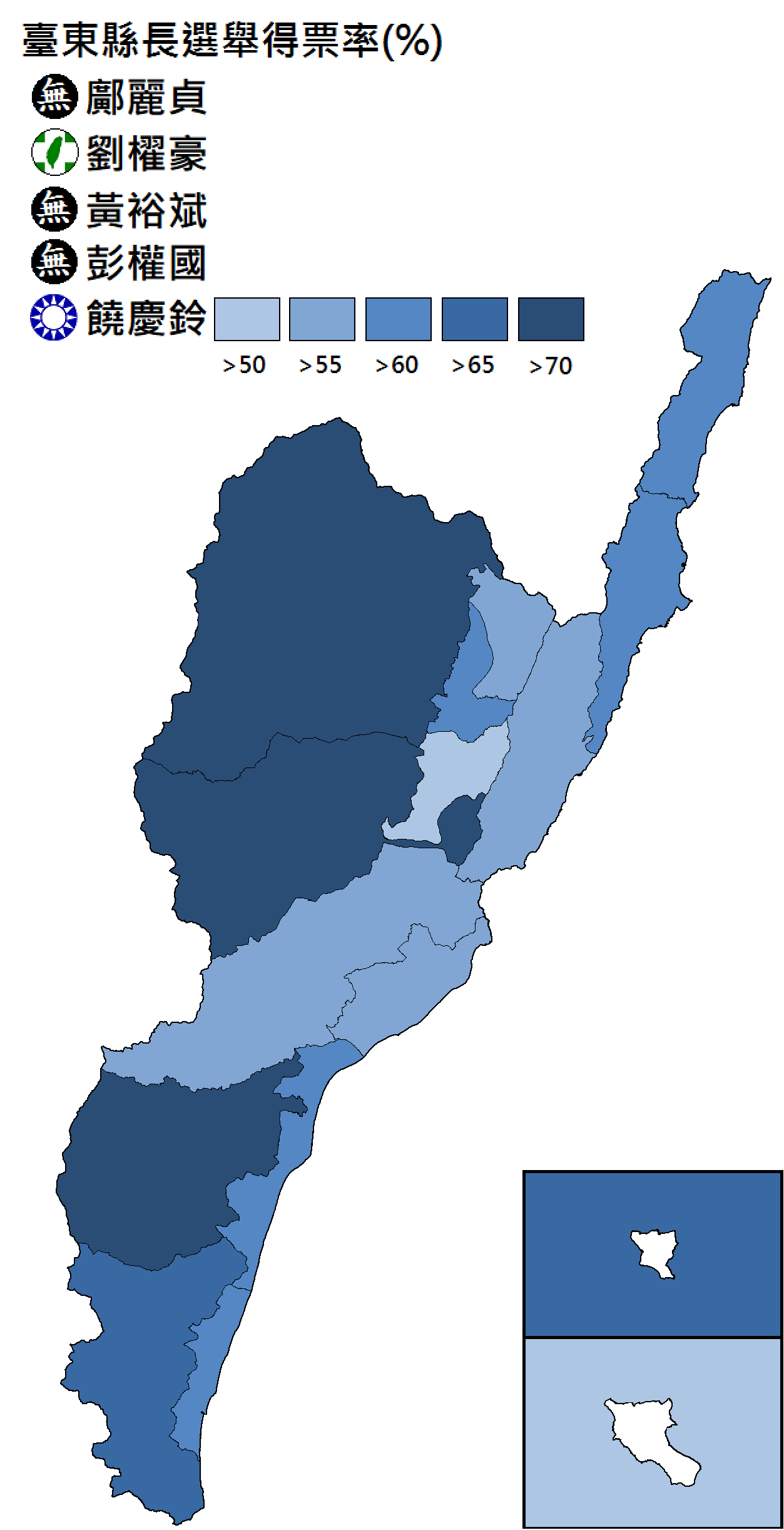

District	Kuang Li-zhen		Liu Chao-hao		Huang Yu-pin		Peng Chuan-kuo		Rao Ching-ling	
District	Votes	%	Votes	%	Votes	%	Votes	%	Votes	%
Taitung City (臺東市)	994	1.78	22,681	40.72	282	0.51	525	0.94	31,213	65.99
Chenggong Township (成功鎮)	251	3.41	2,536	34.41	43	0.58	59	0.80	4,481	60.80
Guanshan Township (關山鎮)	120	2.37	1,779	35.12	28	0.55	44	0.87	3,094	61.09
Binan Township (卑南鄉)	227	2.36	3,583	37.28	37	0.39	64	0.67	5,699	59.30
Luye Township (鹿野鄉)	134	2.93	1,992	43.50	33	0.72	35	0.76	2,385	52.09
Chishang Township (池上鄉)	103	2.32	1,704	38.40	23	0.52	19	0.43	2,588	58.33
Donghe Township (東河鄉)	160	3.40	1,687	35.83	31	0.66	48	1.02	2,782	59.09
Changbin Township (長濱鄉)	186	4.79	1,293	33.32	25	0.64	29	0.75	2,347	60.49
Taimali Township (太麻里鄉)	164	2.46	2,184	32.75	33	0.49	37	0.55	4,251	63.74
Dawu Township (大武鄉)	126	3.47	1,172	32.27	23	0.63	29	0.80	2,282	62.83
Ludao Township (綠島鄉)	48	2.06	719	30.81	5	0.21	26	1.11	1,536	65.81
Haiduan Township (海端鄉)	68	3.06	467	21.04	9	0.41	15	0.68	1,661	74.82
Yanping Township (延平鄉)	104	4.58	460	20.25	20	0.88	11	0.48	1,677	73.81
Jinfeng Township (金峰鄉)	60	2.45	606	24.75	6	0.25	6	0.25	1,770	72.30
Daren Township (達仁鄉)	97	3.93	641	25.95	16	0.65	9	0.36	1,707	69.11
Lanyu Township (蘭嶼鄉)	207	9.72	607	35.70	26	1.22	32	1.50	1,104	51.86

2018 Taitung County mayoral results
No.	Candidate	Party	Votes	Percentage
1	Kuang Li-zhen (鄺麗貞)	Independent	3,049	2.55%
2	Liu Chao-hao (劉櫂豪)	Democratic Progressive Party	44,264	37.04%
3	Huang Yu-pin (黃裕斌)	Independent	640	0.54%
4	Peng Chuan-kuo (彭權國)	Independent	988	0.83%
5	Rao Ching-ling (饒慶鈴)	Kuomintang	70,577	59.05%
Total voters			179,706	
Valid votes			119,518	
Invalid votes				
Voter turnout			66.51%	

=== Penghu County ===
Political context prior to the elections

Results of Past Penghu County Magistrate Elections
Year	Winning Candidate	Political Party
1997	Lai Feng-wei	Kuomintang
2001	Lai Feng-wei	Kuomintang
2005	Lai Feng-wei	Kuomintang
2009	Wang Chien-fa	Kuomintang
2014	Chen Kuang-fu	Democratic Progressive Party

Penghu County

Highest vote share
Party	Year	Vote share %
Democratic Progressive Party	Taiwan local election, 1993	58%
Kuomintang	2008 presidential election	58%

2016 election results
Party	Presidential %	Legislative seat	Legislative %
Democratic Progressive Party	50.81%	1	55.40%
Kuomintang	29.48%	0	39.99%
New Power Party	-	0	-
Taiwan Solidarity Union	-	0	-
People First Party	19.71%	0	-
Independent/Others	-	0	4.61%

Result of the primary

2018 Democratic Progressive Party Penghu County magistrate primary results
Candidates	Place	Result
Chen Kuang-fu	Nominated	Walkover

2018 Kuomintang Penghu County magistrate primary results
Candidates	Place	Results
Lai Feng Wei	Called In	Called in after negotiation

Opinion polls

Poll organization	Date of completion	Chen Kuang-fu	Lai Feng-wei	Not sure	Lead
Era Com	January 19, 2018	26.41%	39.39%	34.2%	12.98%
ETtoday^{1}	July 8, 2018	20.1%	29.1%	32.1%	9%
Shih Shin University^{2}	October 17, 2018	14.9%	23.3%	45%	8.4%
Note:* Opinion polls includes independent candidates.^{1}： Cheng Ching-fa(4.8%); Wu Cheng-lung(3.1%)^{2}： Cheng Ching-fa(5.6%); Wu Cheng-lung(2.3%); Chen Ta-sung(5.0%); On Lee-la (0.8%); Lu Hwa-yuann(0.0%)

Results

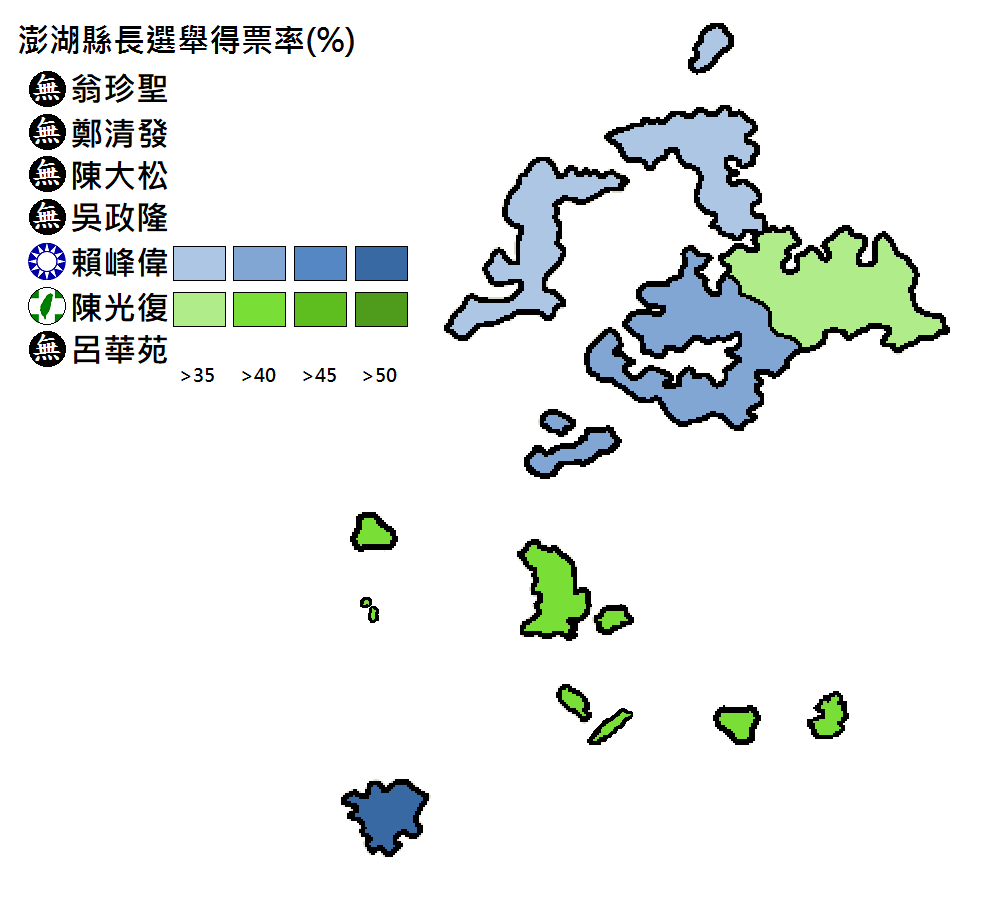

District	On Lee-la		Cheng Ching-fa		Chen Ta-sung		Wu Cheng-lung		Lai Feng-wei		Chen Kuang-fu		Lu Hwa-yuann	
District	Votes	%	Votes	%	Votes	%	Votes	%	Votes	%	Votes	%	Votes	%
Magong City (馬公市)	664	2.13	2,536	8.15	4,215	13.54	1,606	5.16	12,806	41.14	9,043	29.05	257	0.83
Huxi Township (湖西鄉)	93	1.19	797	10.17	563	7.18	733	9.35	2,452	31.28	3,084	39.34	117	1.49
Baisha Township (白沙鄉)	95	1.86	322	6.29	475	9.28	306	5.98	1,951	38.13	1,931	37.74	37	0.72
Xiyu Township (西嶼鄉)	434	10.73	218	5.39	305	7.54	209	5.17	1,558	38.54	1,294	32.01	25	0.62
Wangan Township (望安鄉)	70	2.40	392	13.44	195	6.69	88	3.02	841	28.84	1,310	44.92	20	0.69
Cimei Township (七美鄉)	23	1.23	65	3.47	69	3.68	57	3.04	962	51.36	685	36.57	12	0.64

2018 Penghu County mayoral results
No.	Candidate	Party	Votes	Percentage
1	On Lee-la (翁珍聖)	Independent	1,379	2.61%
2	Cheng Ching-fa (鄭清發)	Independent	4,330	8.18%
3	Chen Ta-sung (陳大松)	Independent	5,822	11.00%
4	Wu Cheng-lung (吳政隆)	Independent	2,999	5.67%
5	Lai Feng-wei (賴峰偉)	Kuomintang	20,570	38.87%
6	Chen Kuang-fu (陳光復)	Democratic Progressive Party	17,347	32.78%
7	Lu Hwa-yuann (呂華苑)	Independent	468	0.88%
Total voters			86,603	
Valid votes			52,915	
Invalid votes				
Voter turnout			61.10%	

== Fujian Province ==
=== Kinmen County ===
Political context prior to the elections

Results of Past Kinmen County Magistrate Elections
Year	Winning Candidate	Political Party
1997	Chen Shui-zai	Kuomintang
2001	Lee Chu-feng	New Party
2005	Lee Chu-feng	New Party
2009	Li Wo-shi	Kuomintang
2014	Chen Fu-hai	Independent

Kinmen County

Highest vote share
Party	Year	Vote share %
Democratic Progressive Party	2016 legislative election	23%
Kuomintang	2008 presidential election	95%

2016 election results
Party	Presidential %	Legislative seat	Legislative %
Democratic Progressive Party	18.00%	0	23.07%
Kuomintang	66.10%	1	45.08%
New Power Party	-	0	-
Taiwan Solidarity Union	-	0	-
People First Party	15.90%	0	-
Independent/Others	-	0	31.85%

Results of the primary

2018 Kuomintang Kinmen County magistrate primary results
Candidates	Place	Result
Yang Cheng-wu	Called In	Walkover

Opinion polls

Poll organization	Date of completion	Yang Cheng-wu	Chen Fu-hai	Not sure	Lead
Polls	July 17, 2018	32.7%	30.6%	36.7%	2.1%
ETtoday	July 23, 2018	28%	23%	40.4%	5%

Results

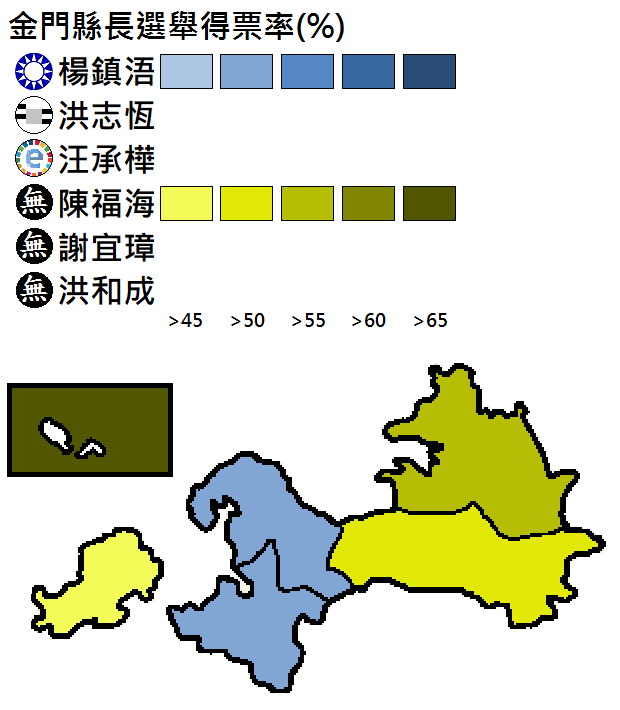

District	Yang Cheng-wu		Kinmen Gaoliang Party Hung Chih-heng		UNESCO budget e-league Wang Cheng-hua		Chen Fu-hai		Hsieh Yi-zhen		Hong Ho-cheng	
District	Votes	%	Votes	%	Votes	%	Votes	%	Votes	%	Votes	%
Jincheng Township (金城鎮)	8,137	54.28	299	1.99	257	0.80	5,916	39.47	412	2.75	106	0.71
Jinsha Township (金沙鎮)	2,974	38.56	87	1.13	50	0.65	4,412	57.20	151	1.96	39	0.51
Jinhu Township (金湖鎮)	4,204	39.07	115	1.07	75	0.70	5,855	54.42	457	4.25	53	0.49
Jinning Township (金寧鄉)	5,989	54.92	206	1.89	140	1.28	4,204	38.55	275	2.52	90	0.83
Lieyu Township (烈嶼鄉)	2,154	46.28	124	2.66	18	0.39	2,186	46.97	94	2.02	78	1.68
Wuqiu Township (烏坵鄉)	62	29.67	1	0.48			146	69.86				

2018 Kinmen County mayoral results
No.	Candidate	Party	Votes	Percentage
1	Yang Cheng-wu (楊鎮浯)	Kuomintang	23,520	47.48%
2	Hung Chih-heng (洪志恒)	Kinmen Gaoliang Party	832	1.69%
3	Wang Cheng-hua (汪承樺)	UNESCO budget e-league	403	0.82%
4	Chen Fu-hai (陳福海)	Independent	22,719	46.15%
5	Hsieh Yi-zhen (謝宜璋)	Independent	1,389	2.82%
6	Hong Ho-cheng (洪和成)	Independent	366	0.74%
Total voters			117,913	
Valid votes			49,229	
Invalid votes				
Voter turnout			41.75%	

=== Lienchiang County ===
Political context prior to the elections

Results of Past Lienchiang County Magistrate Elections
Year	Winning Candidate	Political Party
1997	Liu Li-qun	Kuomintang
2001	Chen Hsueh-sheng	People First Party
2005	Chen Hsueh-sheng	People First Party
2009	Yang Sui-sheng	Kuomintang
2014	Liu Cheng-ying	Kuomintang

Lienchiang County

Highest vote share
Party	Year	Vote share %
Democratic Progressive Party	2016 presidential election	17%
Kuomintang	2009 local election	49%

2016 election results
Party	Presidential %	Legislative seat	Legislative %
Democratic Progressive Party	16.54%	0	-
Kuomintang	68.60%	1	68.07%
New Power Party	-	0	-
Taiwan Solidarity Union	-	0	-
People First Party	14.86%	0	-
Independent/Others	-	0	31.93%

Results of the primary

2018 Kuomintang Lienchiang County magistrate primary results
Candidates	Place	Result
Liu Cheng-ying	Called In	Walkover

Opinion polls

Poll organization	Date of completion	Liu Cheng-ying	Su Po-hao	Not sure	Lead
ETtoday	July 8, 2018	50%	9.8%	24.2%	40.2%

Results

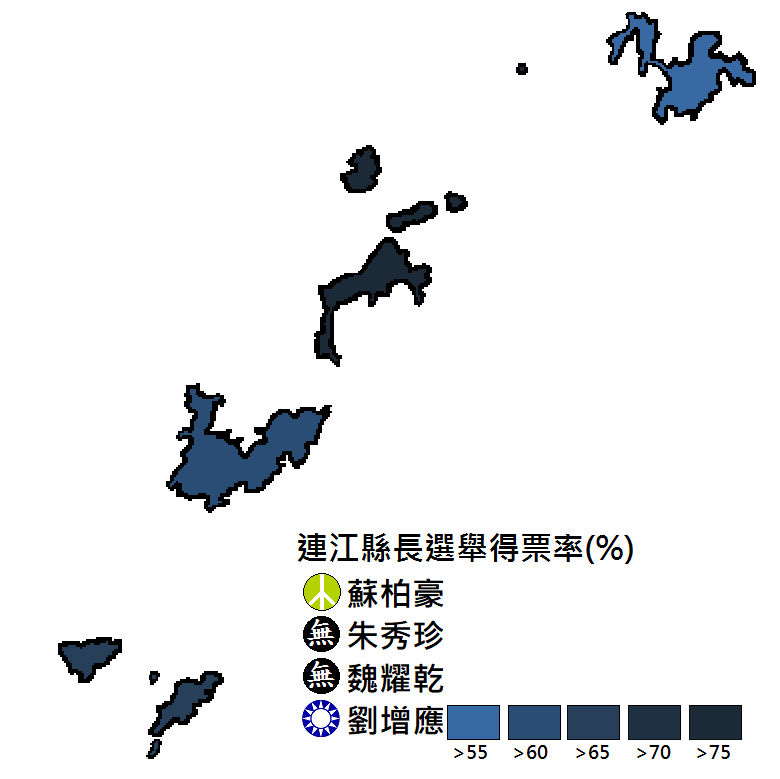

District	Su Po-hao		Chu Hsiu-chen		Wei Yao-kan		Liu Cheng-ying	
District	Votes	%	Votes	%	Votes	%	Votes	%
Nangan Township (南竿鄉)	542	12.98	871	20.86	169	4.05	2,594	62.12
Beigan Township (北竿鄉)	135	9.17	147	9.99	51	3.46	1,139	77.38
Luguang Township (莒光鄉)	100	9.17	182	16.70	76	6.97	732	67.16
Dongyin Township (東引鄉)	150	22.39	84	12.54	40	5.97	396	59.10

2018 Lienchiang County mayoral results
No.	Candidate	Party	Votes	Percentage
1	Su Po-hao (蘇柏豪)	Tree Party	927	12.51%
2	Chu Hsiu-chen (朱秀珍)	Independent	1,284	17.33%
3	Wei Yao-kan (魏耀乾)	Independent	356	4.54%
4	Liu Cheng-ying (劉增應)	Kuomintang	4,861	65.62%
Total voters			10,773	
Valid votes			7,408	
Invalid votes				
Voter turnout			68.76%	

== See also ==
- 2018 Taiwanese local elections
- 2019 Taiwanese by-elections
- 2020 Taiwan legislative election
- 2020 Taiwan presidential election
