= Puzi =

County-administered city in Chiayi County, Taiwan

Puzi 朴子市 Bokushi
- County-administered city
- Puzi City
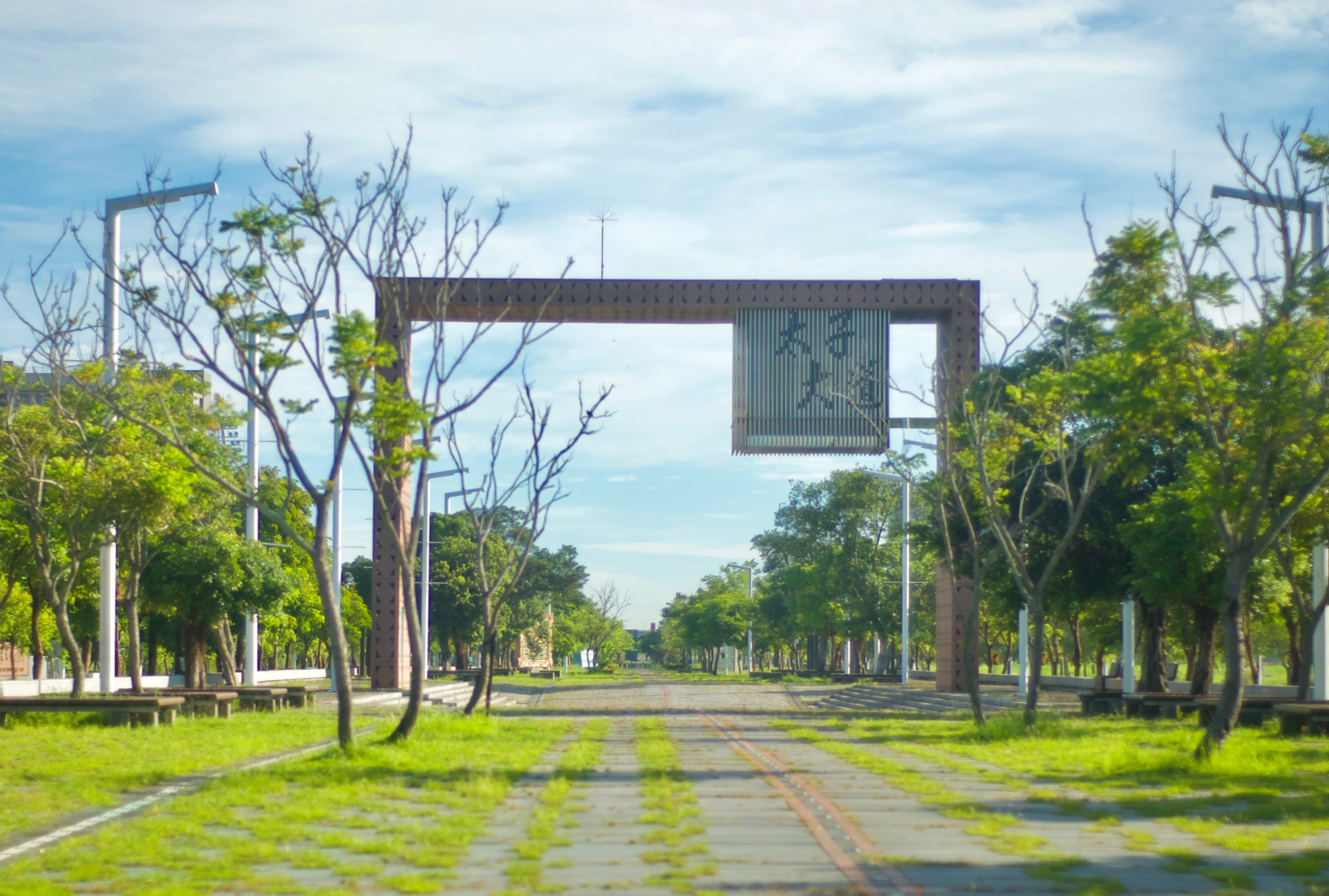

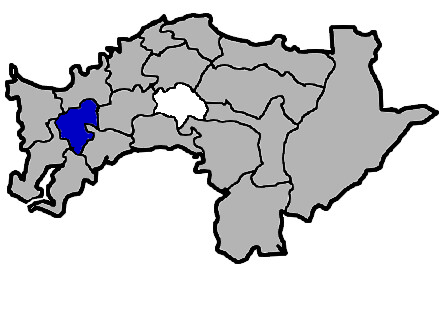

- Location within Taiwan
- Coordinates: 23°27′40″N 120°14′30″E
- Location: Chiayi County, Taiwan

Government
  - Supervisor: Wang Ru-jing

Area
  - Total: 50 km^{2} (19 sq mi)

Population (May 2022)
  - Total: 41,043
  - Density: 820/km^{2} (2,100/sq mi)
- Time zone: UTC+8 (National Standard Time)

Puzi City
- Chinese: 朴子市
Transcriptions
Standard Mandarin
- Hanyu Pinyin: Púzǐ Shì
- Bopomofo: ㄆㄨˊ ㄗˇ ㄕˋ
- Gwoyeu Romatzyh: Pwutzyy Shyh
- Wade–Giles: Pʻu²-tzŭ³ Shih⁴
- Tongyong Pinyin: Púzǐh Shìh
- Yale Romanization: Púdž Shr̀
- MPS2: Pútž Shr̀
- IPA: [pʰǔ.tsɹ̩̀ ʂɻ̩̂]
Hakka
- Pha̍k-fa-sṳ: Phú-chṳ́-sṳ
Southern Min
- Hokkien POJ: Phò-chú-chhī
- Tâi-lô: Phò-tsú-tshī

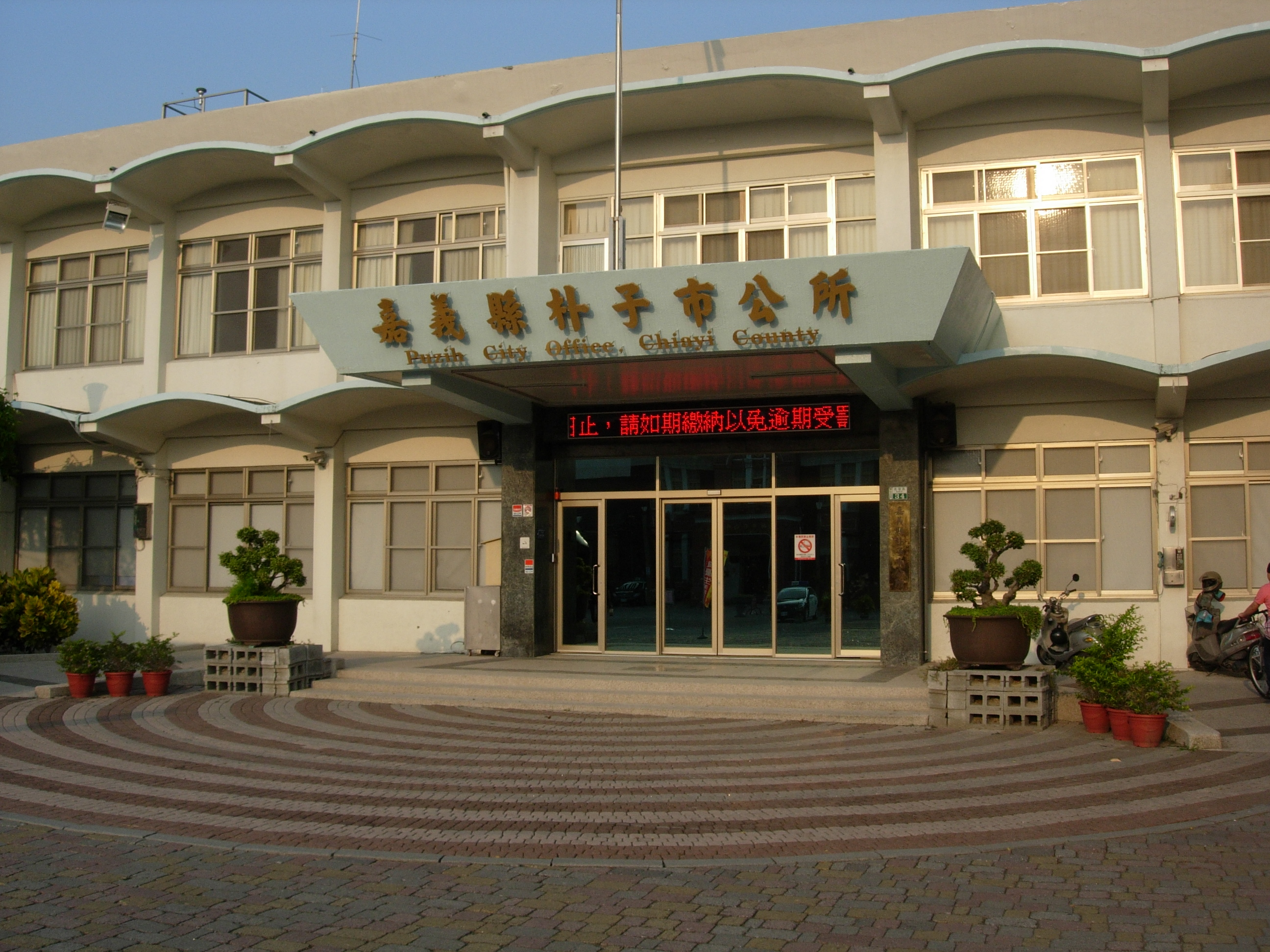
Puzi City Hall

Puzi (Hokkien POJ: Phò-chú) is a county-administered city in Chiayi County, Taiwan. The Chiayi County Council is located in Puzi.

== History ==
The settlement was formerly called Pho-a-kha (Chinese: 樸仔脚; Pe̍h-ōe-jī: Phoh-á-kha) in Hokkien. In 1920, during Japanese rule, it was renamed Bokushi Town (朴子街) and governed under Tōseki District, Tainan Prefecture.

After the World War II in October 1945, Puzi Township was incorporated into Tainan County. On 11 December 1945, the Puzi Township Office was established. In October 1950, Chiayi County Government was established and Puzi Township was incorporated into Chiayi County as a rural township. On 1 July 1992, Puzi Township was upgraded to a county-administered city.

== Geography ==
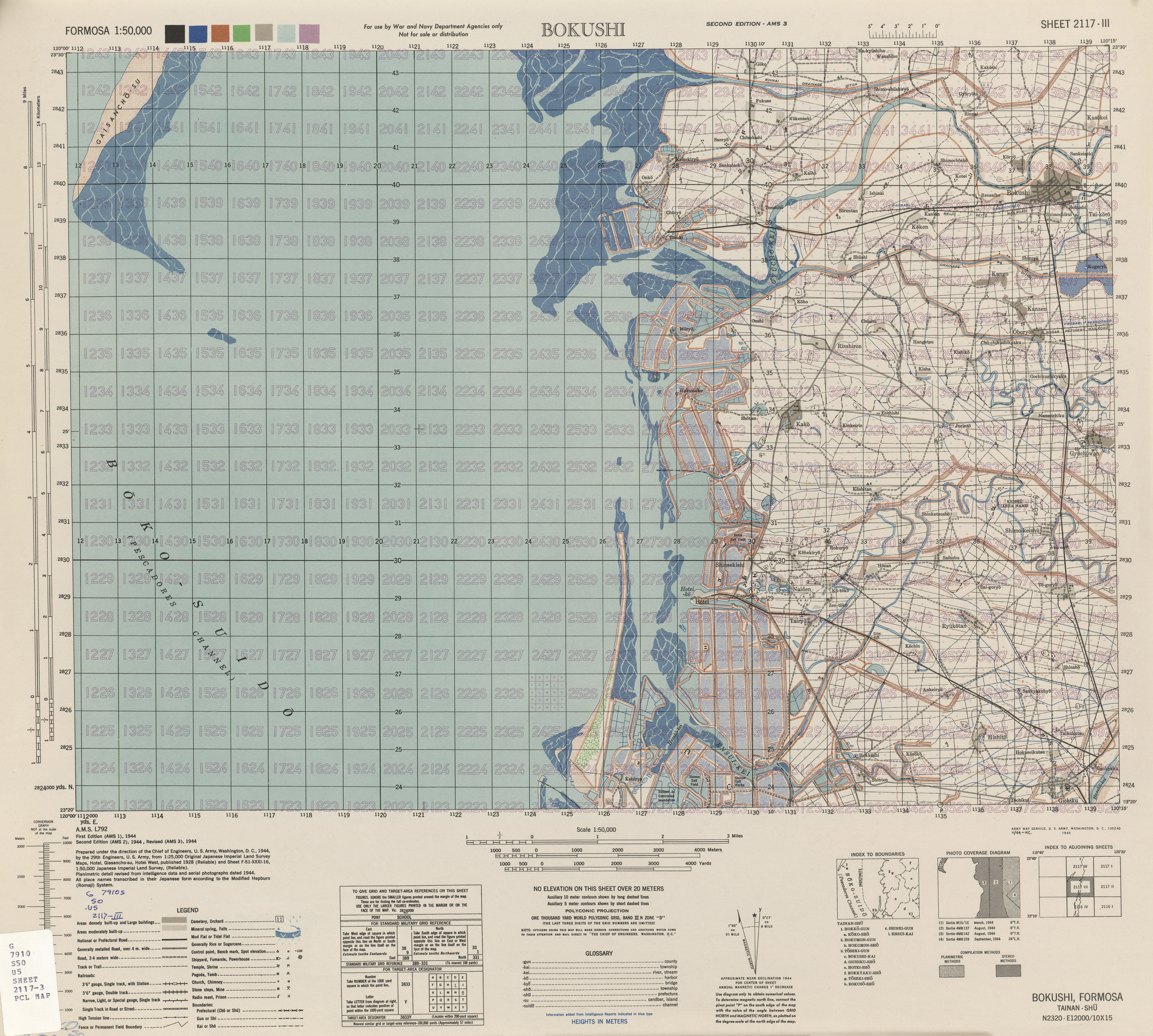
Map of Puzi (labeled as Bokushi) and surrounding area (1944)

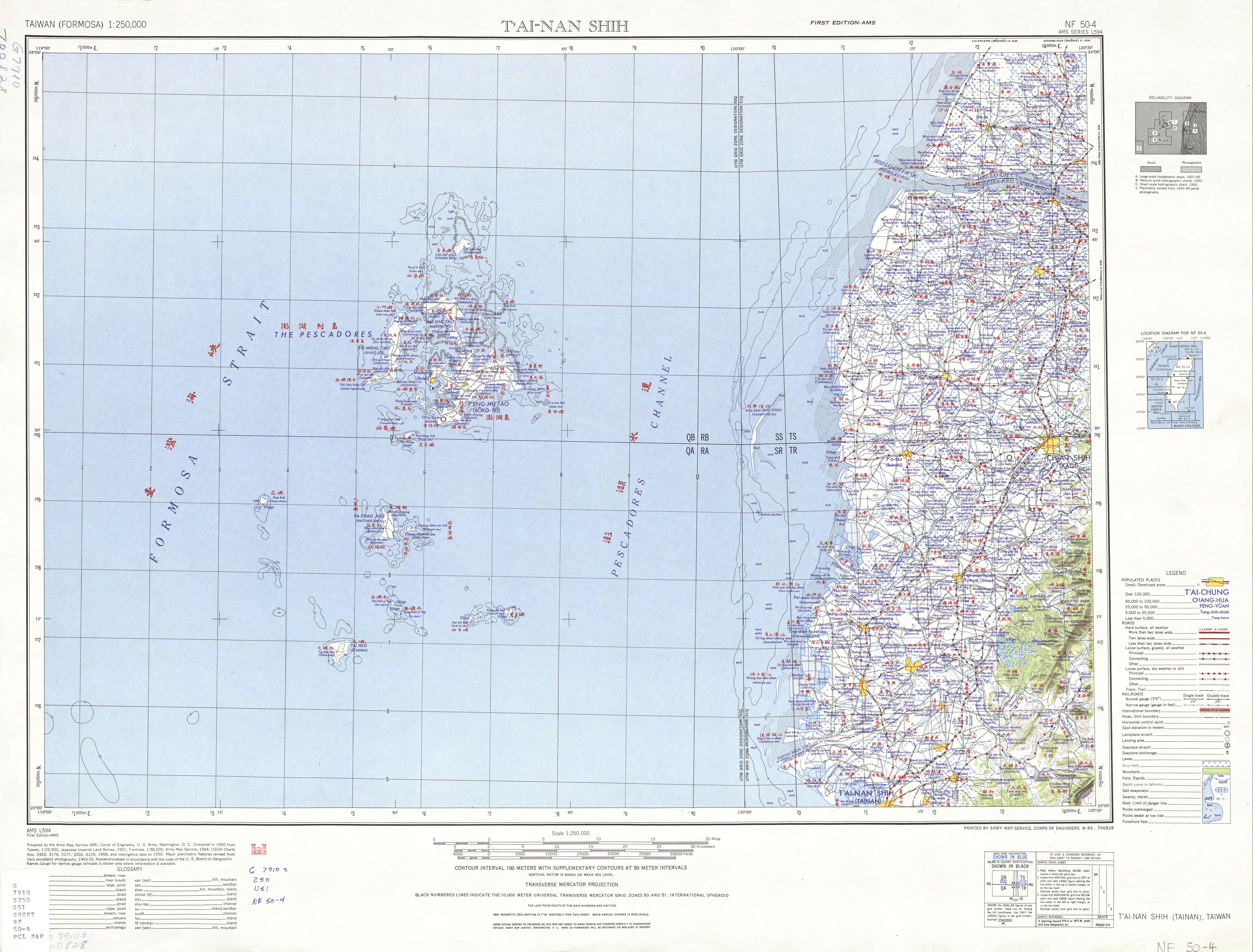
Map including Puzi (labeled as P'o-tzu (Bokushi) 朴子) (1950)

- Area: 49.57 km^{2}
- Population: 41,043 people (May 2022)

== Administrative divisions ==
The township comprises 27 villages: Anfu, Bohou, Dage, Daxiang, Dejia, Dexing, Jiahe, Kaiyuan, Kanhou, Kanqian, Meihua, Nanzhu, Neicuo, Pinghe, Renhe, Songhua, Shuangxi, Shunan, Shuntian, Wenhua, Xikou, Xinliao, Xinzhuang, Yonghe, Zhongzheng, Zhucun and Zhuwei.

== Government institutions ==
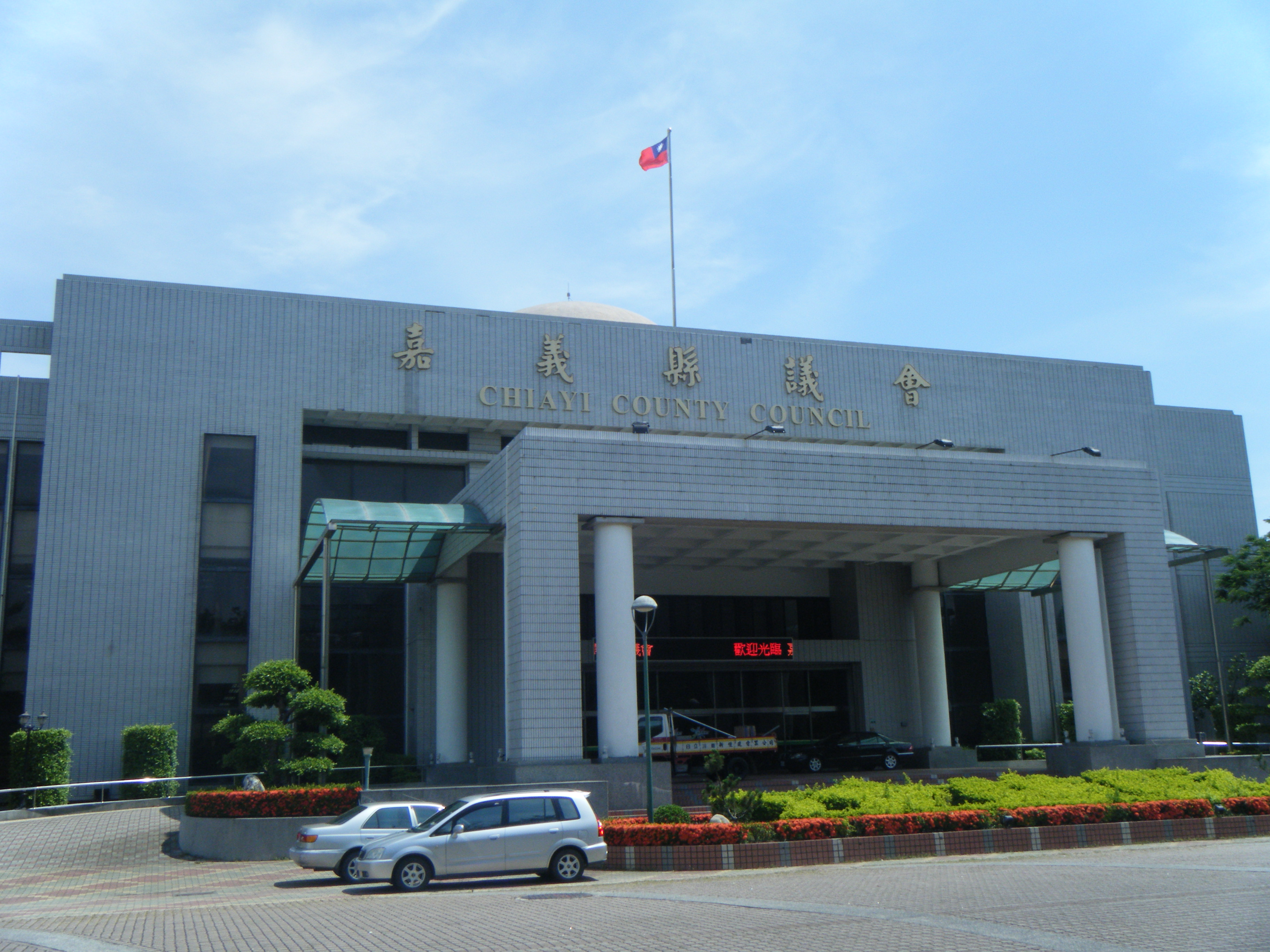
Chiayi County Council

- Chiayi County Council

== Education ==
- Chang Gung University of Science and Technology
- Toko University (defunct)

== Tourist attractions ==
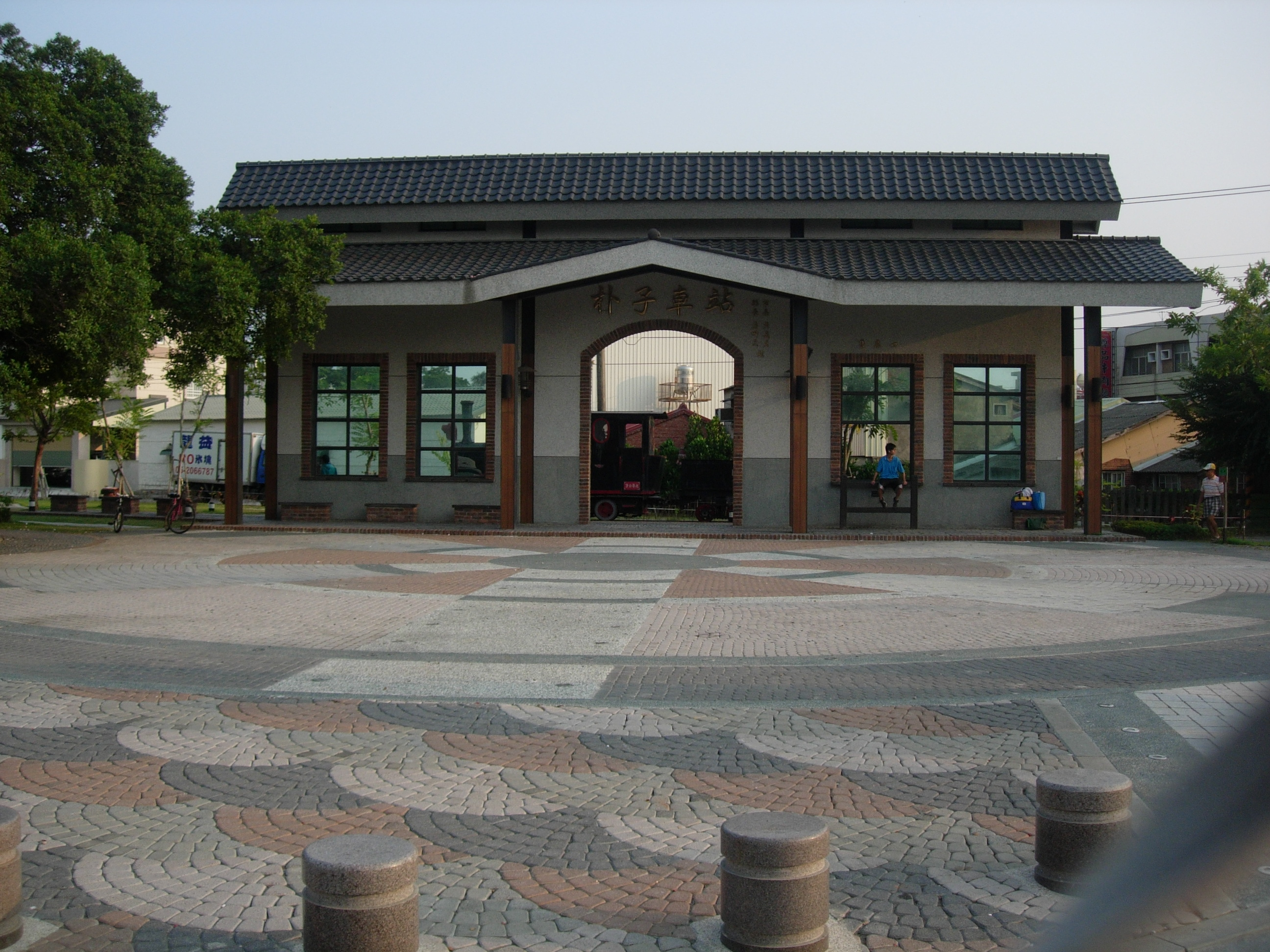
Puzi Railway Park

- Mei-Ling Fine Arts Museum
- Peitian Temple
- Puzih Art Park
- Puzih Embroidery Cultural Hall
- Puzih Railway Park

== Transportation ==
Bus station in the city is Puzi Bus Station of Chiayi Bus.

== Notable natives ==
- Momofuku Ando, inventor of instant noodles
- Hou You-yi, Mayor of New Taipei
- Lin Chieh-liang, physician, nephrologist and toxicologist
- Twu Shiing-jer, Mayor of Chiayi City (2014–2018)
- Wu Rong-ming, Vice President of Examination Yuan (2004–2008)

== Climate ==
Climate data for Puzi (2016–2023 normals, extremes 2016–present)
Month	Jan	Feb	Mar	Apr	May	Jun	Jul	Aug	Sep	Oct	Nov	Dec	Year
Record high °C (°F)	29.2 (84.6)	31.4 (88.5)	31.1 (88.0)	32.1 (89.8)	34.5 (94.1)	35.3 (95.5)	35.2 (95.4)	34.9 (94.8)	34.9 (94.8)	34.2 (93.6)	32.4 (90.3)	29.8 (85.6)	35.3 (95.5)
Mean daily maximum °C (°F)	21.7 (71.1)	22.2 (72.0)	25.2 (77.4)	27.9 (82.2)	30.4 (86.7)	32.1 (89.8)	32.5 (90.5)	32.0 (89.6)	32.0 (89.6)	30.0 (86.0)	27.3 (81.1)	23.1 (73.6)	28.0 (82.5)
Daily mean °C (°F)	17.1 (62.8)	17.5 (63.5)	20.4 (68.7)	23.5 (74.3)	26.5 (79.7)	28.3 (82.9)	28.9 (84.0)	28.4 (83.1)	28.0 (82.4)	25.6 (78.1)	22.7 (72.9)	18.8 (65.8)	23.8 (74.9)
Mean daily minimum °C (°F)	14.3 (57.7)	14.4 (57.9)	16.9 (62.4)	20.2 (68.4)	23.5 (74.3)	25.3 (77.5)	25.9 (78.6)	25.7 (78.3)	25.2 (77.4)	22.7 (72.9)	19.7 (67.5)	15.9 (60.6)	20.8 (69.5)
Record low °C (°F)	4.9 (40.8)	7.3 (45.1)	9.4 (48.9)	12.7 (54.9)	15.8 (60.4)	22.9 (73.2)	21.8 (71.2)	22.7 (72.9)	21.2 (70.2)	15.3 (59.5)	12.0 (53.6)	8.6 (47.5)	4.9 (40.8)
Average precipitation mm (inches)	30.4 (1.20)	21.8 (0.86)	49.3 (1.94)	82.2 (3.24)	155.4 (6.12)	253.3 (9.97)	210.2 (8.28)	326.9 (12.87)	115.3 (4.54)	17.2 (0.68)	11.8 (0.46)	29.4 (1.16)	1,303.1 (51.30)
Average precipitation days	4.4	3.7	6.1	6.3	8.9	12.8	11.9	15.1	5.6	3.0	2.6	3.4	83.8
Average relative humidity (%)	80.4	79.7	79.2	79.6	82.7	83.4	81.7	84.3	80.1	78.4	80.3	78.3	80.7
Source 1: Central Weather Administration
Source 2: Atmospheric Science Research and Application Databank (precipitation days and humidity 2015–2024)
