= Toko University =

Defunct university in Chiayi County, Taiwan

- 稻江科技暨管理學院
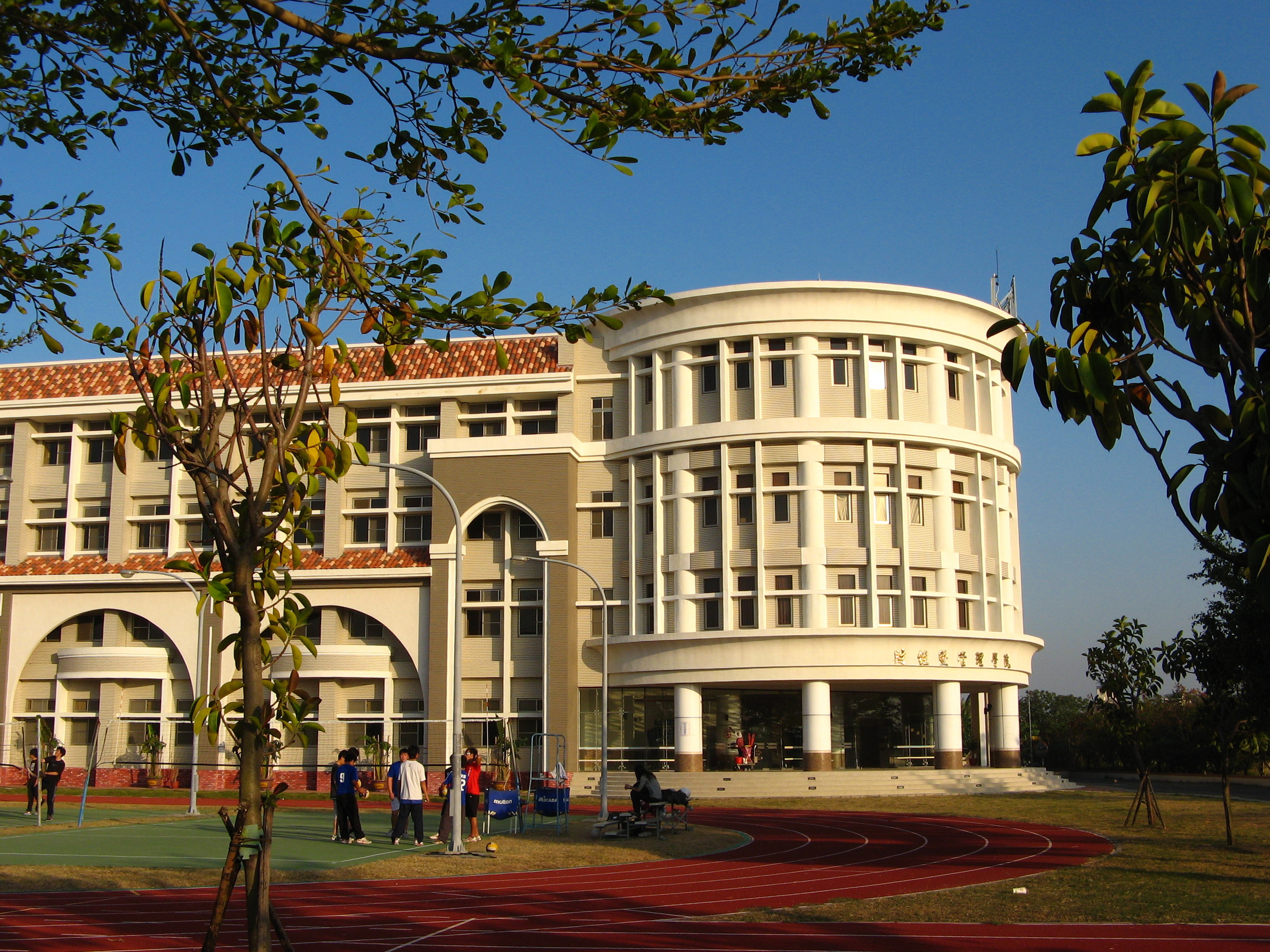
- Motto: 科技、智慧、創造、榮譽
- Motto in English: Science and technology, intelligence, creativity, honor
- Type: private
- Active: August 2001–31 July 2021
- President: Dr. Shih Kuang-hsun
- Location: Puzi, Chiayi County, Taiwan; 23°26′55.7″N 120°17′23.1″E
- Website: www.toko.edu.tw

Toko University
- Traditional Chinese: 稻江科技暨管理學院
- Simplified Chinese: 稻江科技暨管理学院
Transcriptions
Standard Mandarin
- Hanyu Pinyin: Dàojiāng Kējìjì Guǎnlǐ Xuéyuàn

Toko University (TOKO; Chinese: 稻江科技暨管理學院; lit. 'Daojiang Technology and Management College') was a private university from 2001 to 2021 in Puzi, Chiayi County, Taiwan.

== History ==
The university was founded in 2001. In 2019, the university had only 37.23% of enrollment rate. In May 2020, the university announced its planning of closure due to low enrollment. In July 2020, the Ministry of Education rejected the university's plan to close down. In May 2021, the university filled an application again for closing down to the ministry and on 23 June 2021, the ministry announced that the university would close down on 31 July 2021.

== Faculties ==
- College of Technology and Design
- College of Economy and Management
- College of Human Ecology
- Center for General Education

== Alumni ==
- Yu Cheng-ta, Speaker of Chiayi County Council

== See also ==
- List of universities in Taiwan
