= Chang Gung University of Science and Technology =

University in Guishan, Taoyuan City, Taiwan

Coordinates: 25.0333°N 121.3901°E

- 長庚科技大學
- Former names: Ming Chi College of Technology; Chang Gung Institute of Nursing; Chang Gung Institute of Technology
- Motto: 勤勞樸實(Pe̍h-ōe-jī: Khîn-lô Phok-si̍t)
- Motto in English: Diligence, Perseverance, Frugality and Trustworthiness
- Type: private university
- Established: 1983 (as Ming Chi College of Technology); August 2011 (as CGUST)
- Location: Guishan, Taoyuan City, Taiwan; Puzi, Chiayi County, Taiwan
- Website: Official website

Chang Gung University of Science and Technology
- Traditional Chinese: 長庚科技大學
- Simplified Chinese: 长庚科技大学
Transcriptions
Standard Mandarin
- Hanyu Pinyin: Chánggēng Kējì Dàxué
Southern Min
- Hokkien POJ: Tióng-keng Kho-ki Tāi-ha̍k

Chang Gung University of Science and Technology (CGUST; Chinese: 長庚科技大學; Pe̍h-ōe-jī: Tióng-keng Kho-ki Tāi-ha̍k) is a private university in Guishan District, Taoyuan City, and Puzi City, Chiayi County of Taiwan.

== History ==
CGUST was originally established as Ming Chi College of Technology in 1983. In 1988, the Chang Gung Institute of Nursing was established as a two-year junior college program for nursing. A five-year program was established in 1991 and the institute was promoted to Chang Gung Institute of Technology. It also offered a two-year college program. In 2004, the institute offered a four-year college program. In August 2011 the name was changed to Chang Gung University of Science and Technology.

== Faculties ==
- College of Nursing
- College of Human Ecology
- Center for General Education

== Transportation ==
The Taoyuan Campus is within walking distance south of National Taiwan Sport University Station of Taoyuan Airport MRT. The Chiayi Campus is within walking distance west from Chiayi Station of the Taiwan High Speed Rail.

== See also ==
- List of universities in Taiwan
