= Shuishang =

Rural township in Chiayi County, Taiwan

Coordinates: 23°25′55″N 120°24′53″E

Shuishang Township 水上鄉 Mizukami
- Rural township
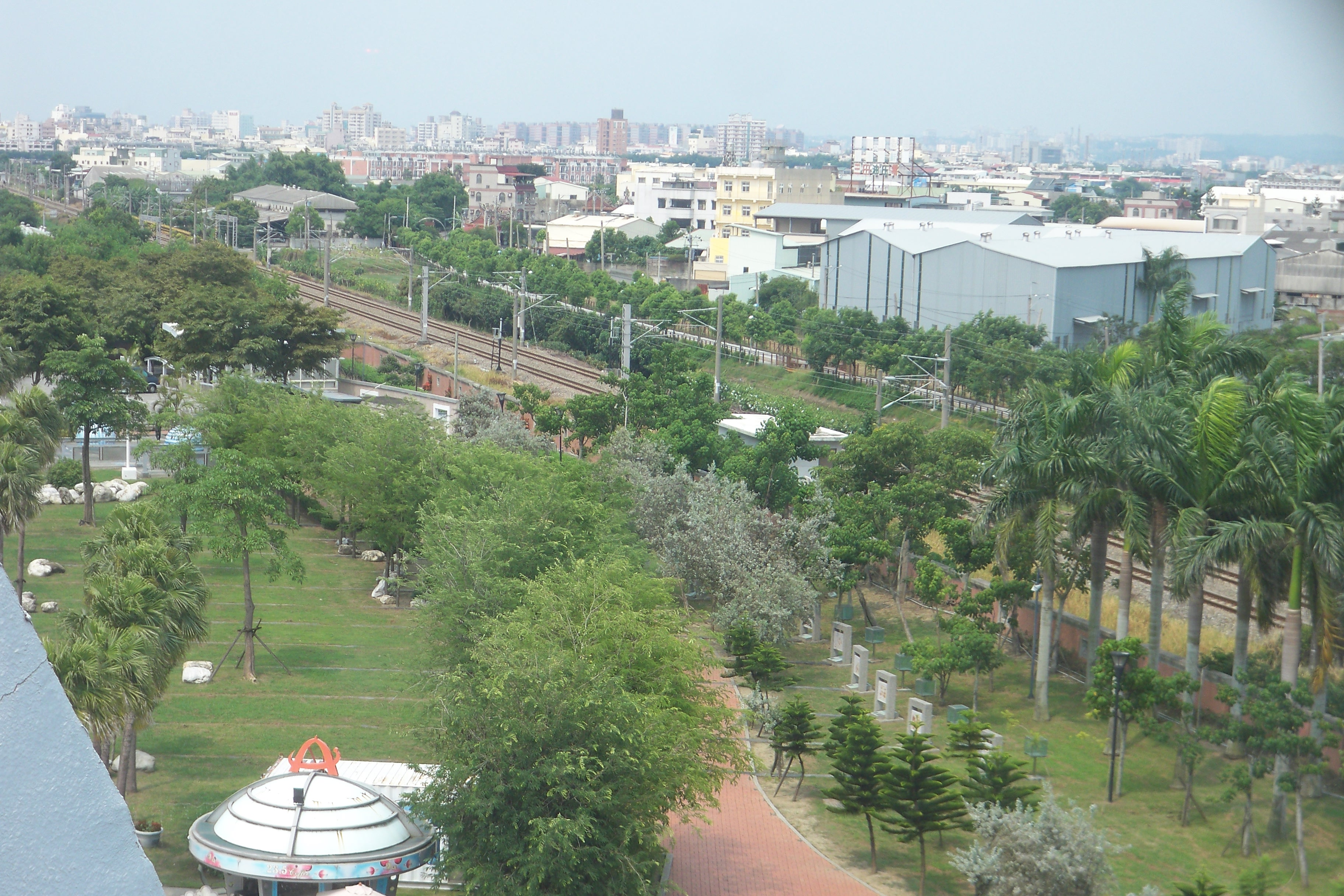

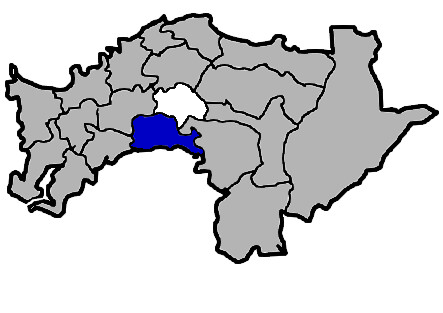
- Shuishang Township in Chiayi County
- Location: Chiayi County, Taiwan

Area
  - Total: 69.1198 km^{2} (26.6873 sq mi)

Population (May 2022)
  - Total: 48,164

Shuishang Township (Chinese: 水上鄉; pinyin: Shuǐshàng Xiāng, meaning "near water") is a rural township in Chiayi County, Taiwan.

== History ==
After the handover of Taiwan from Japan to the Republic of China in 1945, Shuishang was established as part of Tainan County. In 1946, it was incorporated into Chiayi City as a district. In 1950, Chiayi County was established after being separated from Tainan County and Shuishang was made a rural township of Chiayi County.

== Geography ==
The Taiwanese township has a population total of 48,164 and an area of 69.1198 km^{2}.

== Administrative divisions ==
The township comprises 25 villages: Cuxi, Daku, Dalun, Guoxing, Huigui, Jinghe, Kuanshi, Liulin, Liuxiang, Liuxin, Longde, Minsheng, Nanhe, Nanxiang, Neixi, Sanhe, Sanjie, Sanzeng, Shuishang, Shuitou, Tugou, Xialiao, Xizhou, Yixing, Zhonghe and Zhongzhuang.

== Tourist attractions ==
- Tropic of Cancer Monument

== Transportation ==
=== Air ===
The township houses the Chiayi Airport.

=== Rails ===
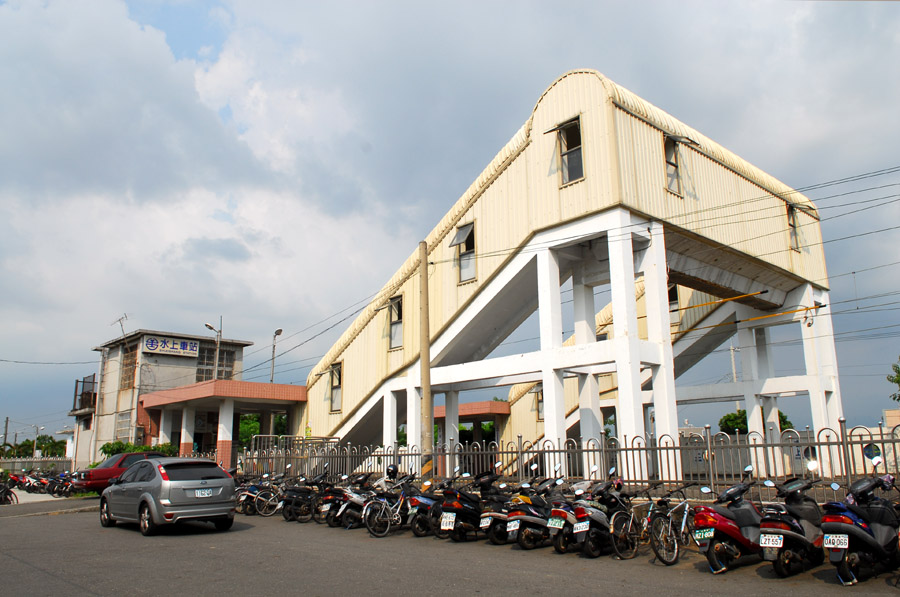
Shuishang Station

- TR Nanjing Station
- TR Shuishang Station

=== Roads ===
The township is connected to Dongshi Township through Provincial Highway 82.
