= Xikou, Chiayi =

Rural township in Chiayi County, Taiwan

Coordinates: 23°35′41.0″N 120°23′41.2″E

Xikou Township 溪口鄉 Sikou
- Rural township
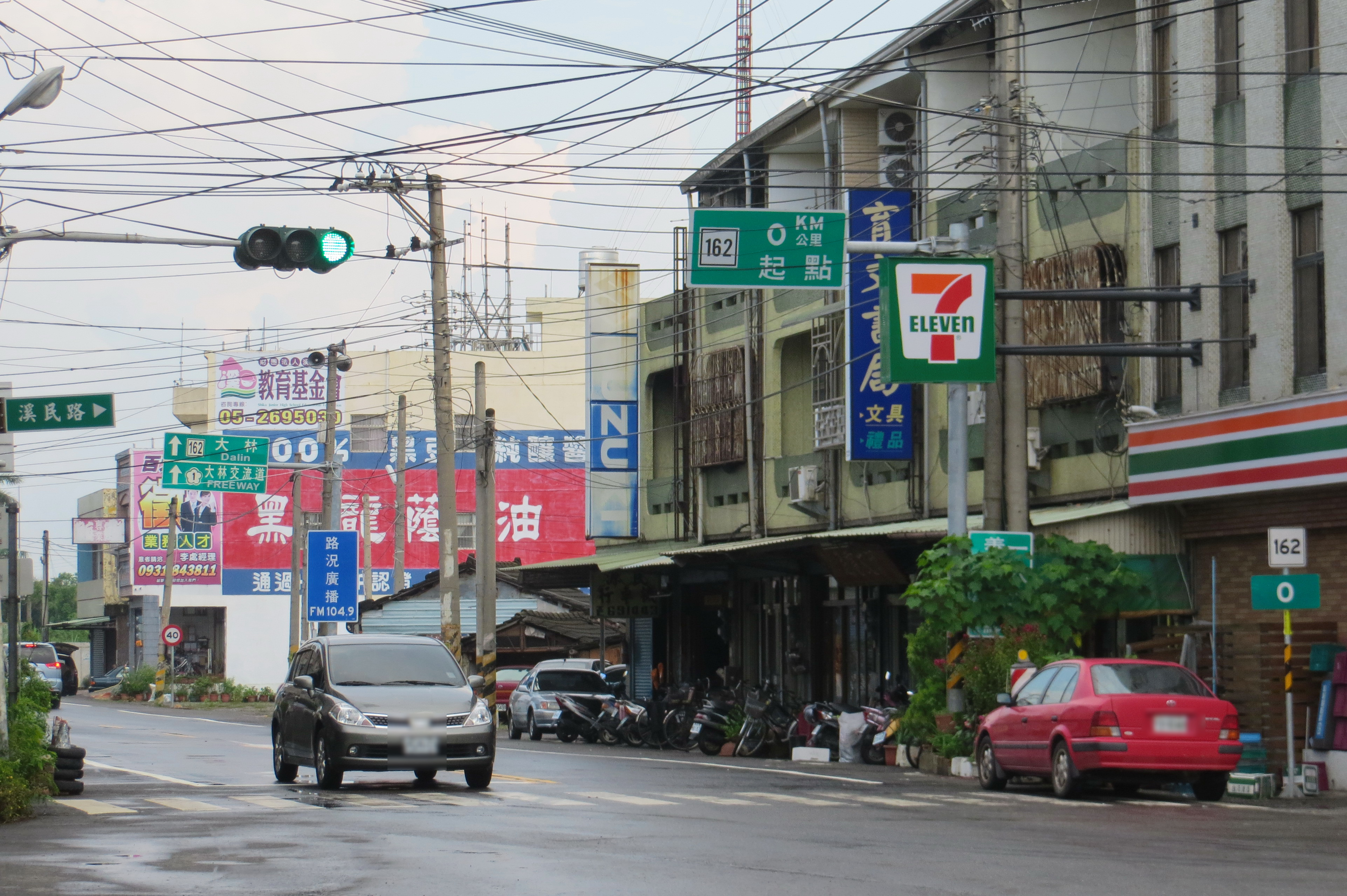

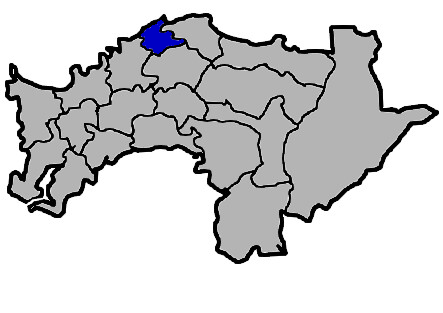
- Country: Taiwan

Area
  - Total: 33 km^{2} (13 sq mi)

Population (May 2022)
  - Total: 13,658
  - Density: 410/km^{2} (1,100/sq mi)

Xikou Township or Sikou Township (Chinese: 溪口鄉; pinyin: Xīkǒu Xiāng) is a rural township in Chiayi County, Taiwan.

== Name ==
Xikou's former name (Chinese: 雙溪口; Pe̍h-ōe-jī: Siang-khe-kháu; lit. 'two river mouth') refers to the confluence of two rivers, which are Huasing River (華興溪) and Sandie River (三疊溪) coming from the northwest and southwest respectively.

== History ==
Han Chinese firstly settled around the area of Xikou Township since more than 200 years ago. In early 1980s, its population peaked at 21,000 but has been declining since then.

== Geography ==
It has a population total of 13,658 and an area of 33.0463 km^{2}. It is the smallest area of any city or township of Chiayi County. The township land is generally well-watered and flat.

== Administration ==
The township consists of 14 villages, which are Bencuo, Chailin, Deisi, Linjiao, Liougou, Meibei, Meinan, Miaolun, Pingding, Sibei, Sidong, Sisi, Youdong and Yousi.

== Economy ==
Agriculture is the predominant industry in the county. Crops include tomatoes and muskmelon. There are only a few factories in the area.

== Tourist attractions ==
- Xikou Township Cultural Life Center

== Notable natives ==
- Jody Chiang, singer
