= Tropic of Cancer Monument =

Monument in Shuishang, Chiayi County, Taiwan

- 嘉義北回歸線標誌
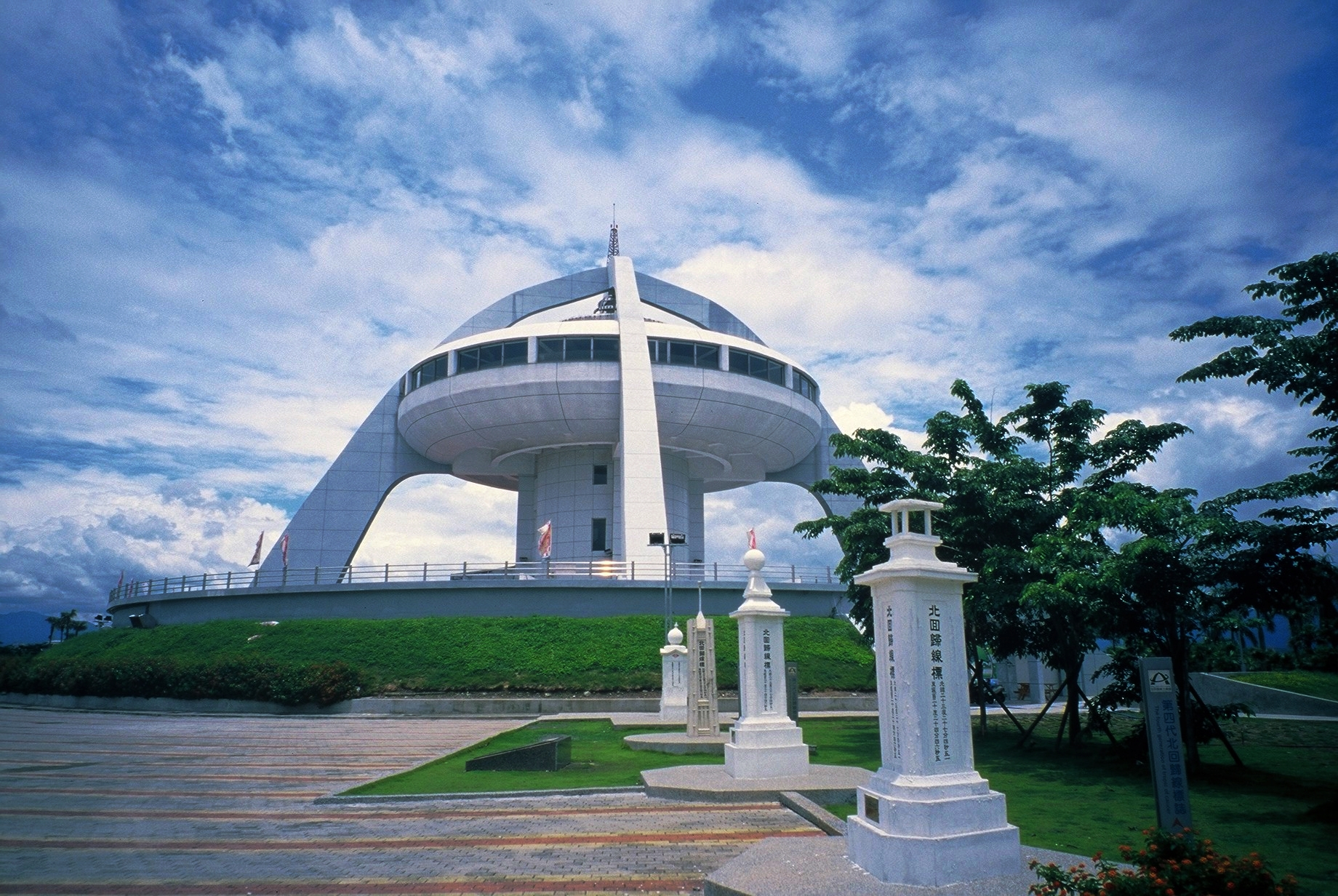
- Interactive map of Tropic of Cancer Monument
- Location: Shuishang, Chiayi County, Taiwan
- Coordinates: 23°27′14.1″N 120°25′00.2″E
- Type: monument
- Opening date: 1995
- Dedicated to: Tropic of Cancer

The Tropic of Cancer Monument (traditional Chinese: 嘉義北回歸線標誌; simplified Chinese: 嘉义北回归线标志; pinyin: Jiāyì Běi Huíguīxiàn Biāozhì) is a monument in Shuishang Village, Shuishang Township, Chiayi County, Taiwan.

== History ==
The monument was originally built in 1908 during the Japanese colonial era, to celebrate the completion of the Taiwan Railway from north to south. The second-generation marker was rebuilt on the same site in 1921. In 1923, a third-generation marker was built about 50 meters west of the original site, moving from beside the railway to the east side of the provincial highway. In 1935, the marker was reinforced and repaired, and by 1942, the fifth-generation marker was inscribed with "North Tropic of Cancer Line Marker" and the coordinates were removed.

The current building was completed in 1995. Since then, the site has expanded from a single monument to include a building complex.

== Geography ==
The monument is located along the Tropic of Cancer line which cut across Taiwan.

== See also ==
- List of tourist attractions in Taiwan
