= Shuishang railway station =

Railway station in Shuishang, Chiayi County, Taiwan

Shuishang Station 水上車站
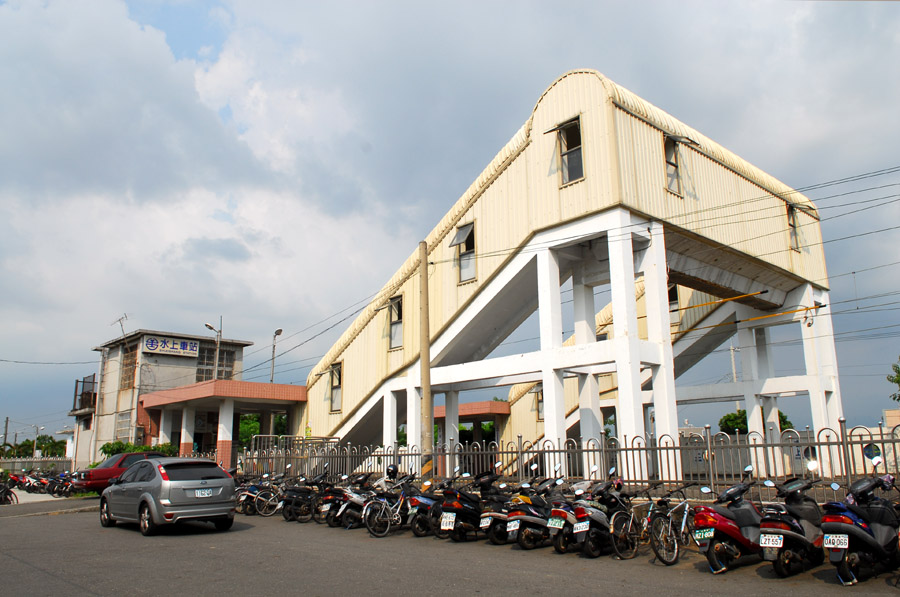

General information
- Location: Shuishang, Chiayi County, Taiwan
- Coordinates: 23°26′02″N 120°23′58.2″E
- System: Train station
- Owner: Taiwan Railway Corporation
- Operator: Taiwan Railway Corporation
- Line: Western Trunk line
- Train operators: Taiwan Railway Corporation

Passengers
- 1,323 daily (2024)
Location

Shuishang (Chinese: 水上車站; Hanyu Pinyin: Shuǐshàng Chēzhàn; Tongyong Pinyin: Shuěishàng Chejhàn) is a railway station on the Taiwan Railway West Coast line located in Shuishang Township, Chiayi County, Taiwan.

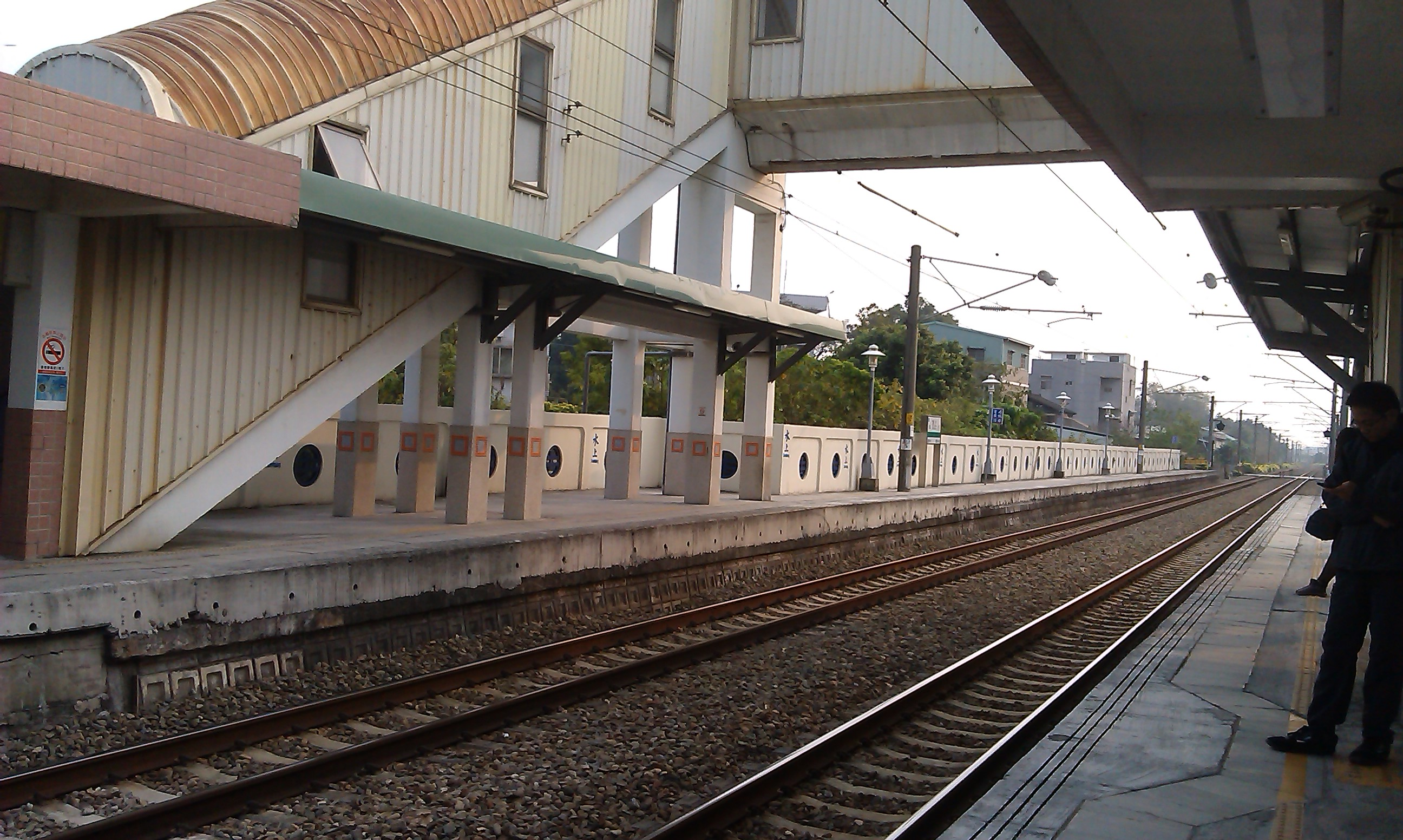
Shuishang station platform

== History ==
The station was established on 20 April 1920.

== See also ==
- List of railway stations in Taiwan

Preceding station	Taiwan Railway	Following station
Chiayi towards Keelung	Western Trunk line	Nanjing towards Pingtung
