= Budai, Chiayi =

Urban township in Chiayi County, Taiwan

Coordinates: 23°21′36″N 120°10′12″E

Budai Township 布袋鎮 Putai
- Urban township
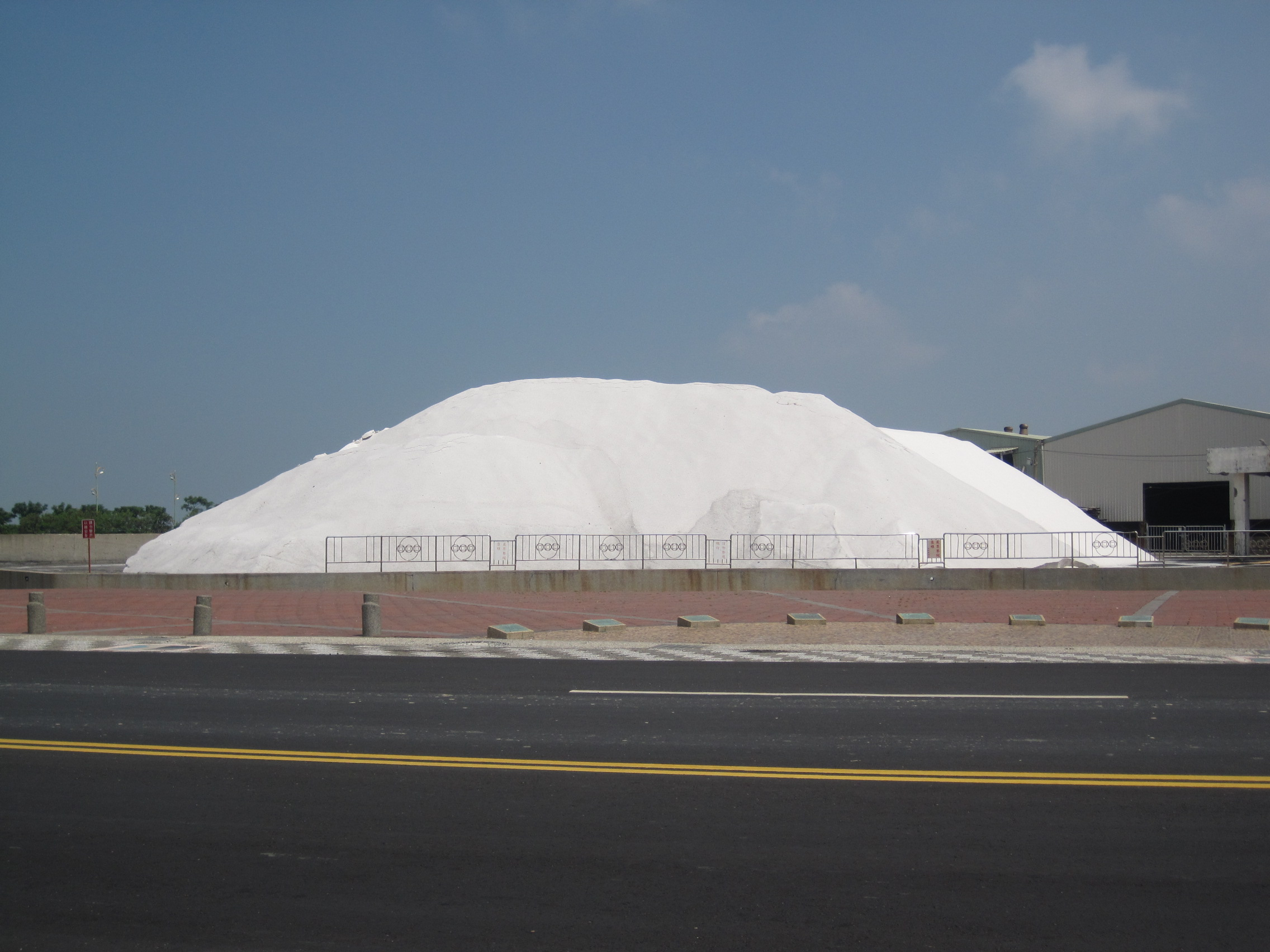
- Salt mound in Budai Township

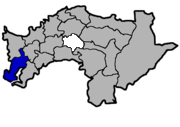
- Budai Township in Chiayi County
- Country: Taiwan
- Province: Taiwan Province
- County: Chiayi

Government
  - Supervisor: Cai Kun-bin

Area
  - Total: 61.7307 km^{2} (23.8344 sq mi)

Population (May 2022)
  - Total: 25,267
  - Density: 409.31/km^{2} (1,060.1/sq mi)
- Website: www.budai.gov.tw

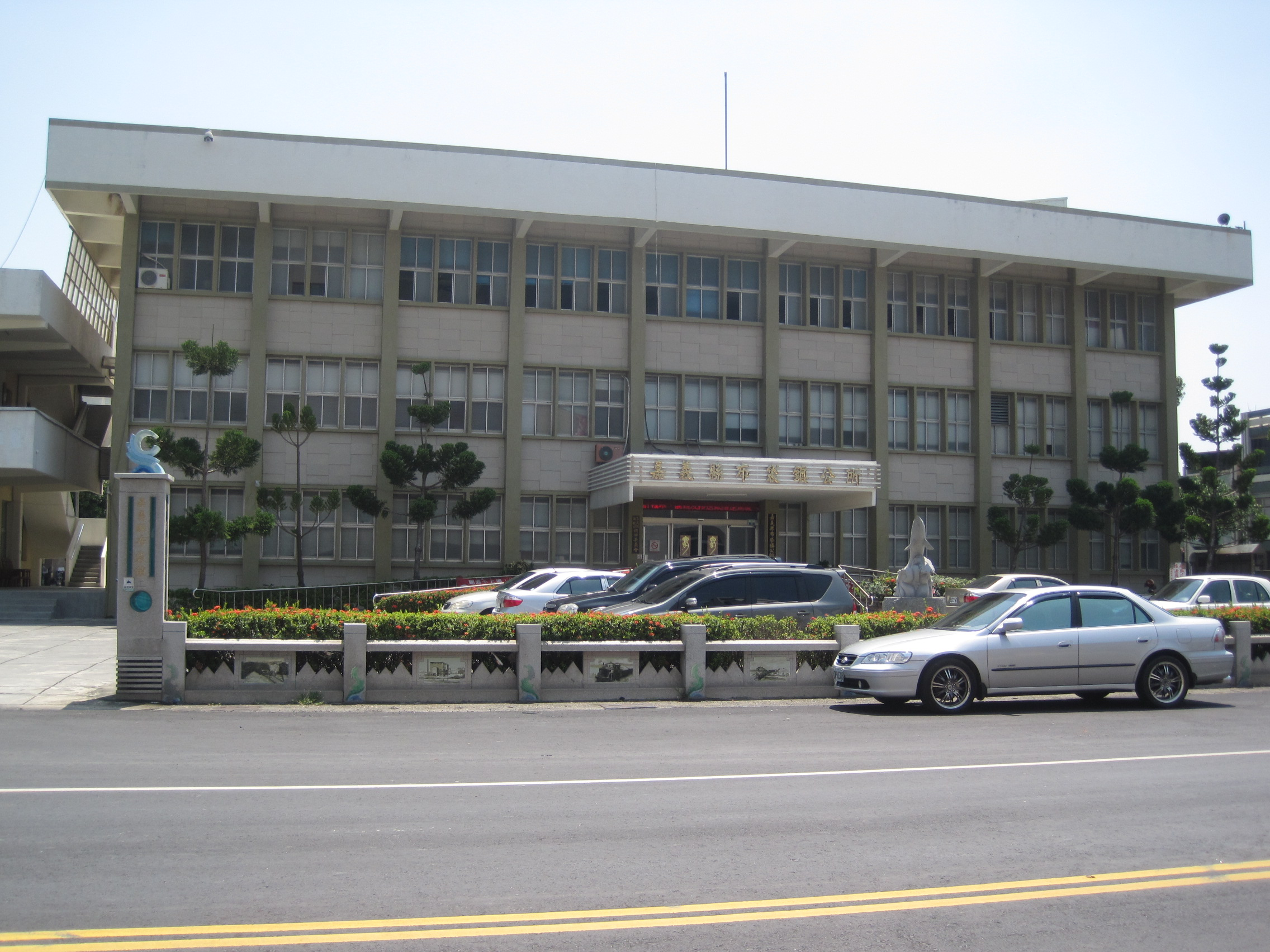
Budai Township Office

Budai Township (Chinese: 布袋鎮; pinyin: Bùdài Zhèn) is an urban township in Chiayi County, Taiwan.

== History ==
Formerly known as Po-te-chhui (Chinese: 布袋嘴; Pe̍h-ōe-jī: Pò͘-tē-chhùi), it was the site where Japanese forces landed and completed the encirclement of Tainan during the Japanese invasion in 1895.

== Administrative divisions ==
The township comprises 23 villages: Caipu, Cenhai, Daijiang, Fuxing, Guangfu, Guishe, HaomeiJiangshan, Jianlong, Jiulong, Kaoshi, Longjiang, Shulin, Tungan, Tunggang, Xian, Xincen, Xincuo, Xingzhong, Xinmin, Yongan, Zhenliao, and Zhongan.

== Economy ==
Its industry is mainly made up of fishery.

== Tourist attractions ==
- Haomeiliao Wetland
- High-Heel Wedding Church

== Transportation ==
- Budai Harbor

== Notable natives ==
- Chai Trong-rong, member of Legislative Yuan (1993–1996, 1997–2012)
