= High-Heel Wedding Church =

Building in Budai, Chiayi County, Taiwan

- 高跟鞋教堂
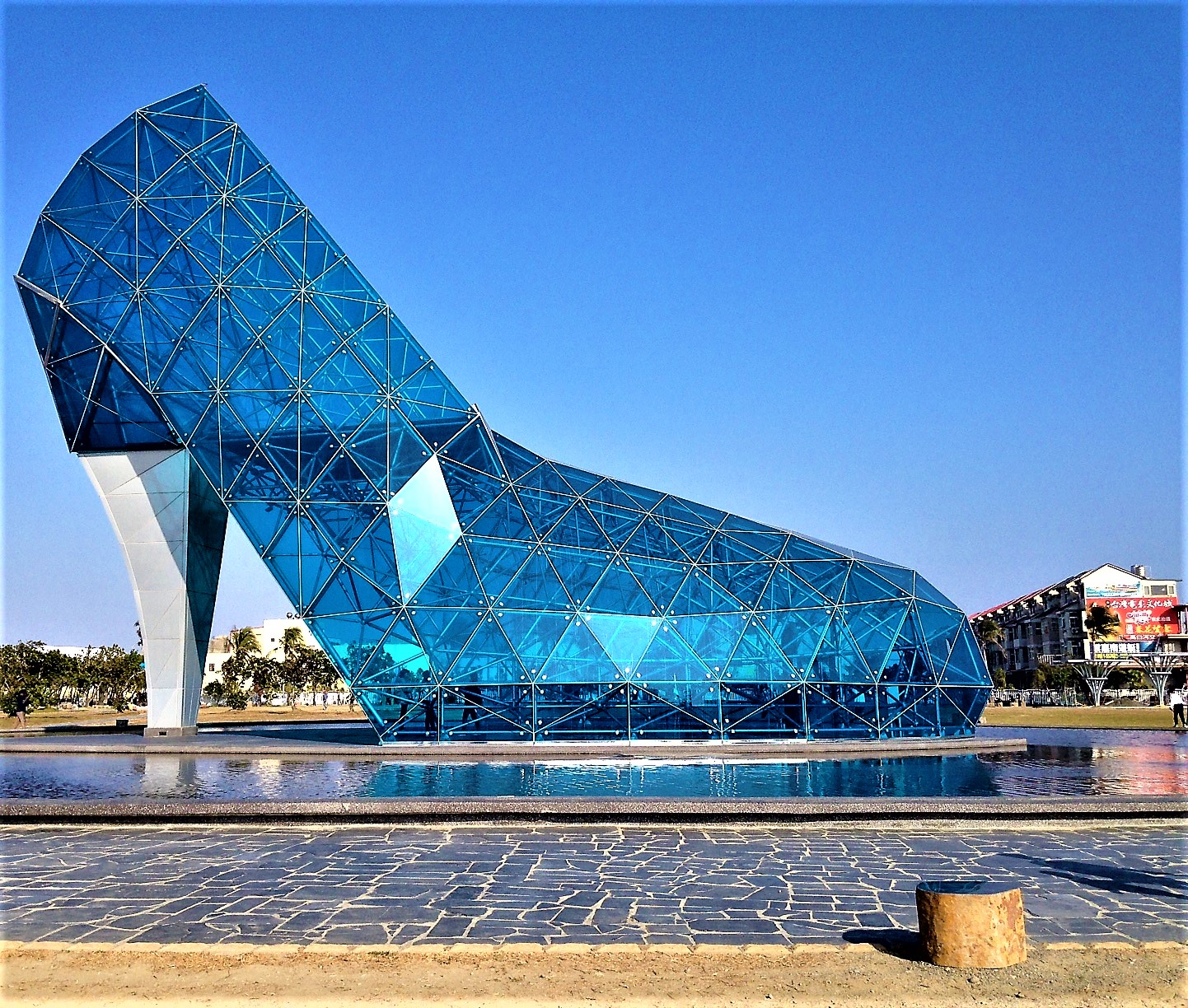
- Interactive map of the High-Heel Wedding Church area

General information
- Architectural style: Contemporary modern, novelty
- Location: Budai, Chiayi County, Taiwan
- Coordinates: 23°22′40.3″N 120°08′55.5″E
- Completed: 10 January 2016
- Cost: US$686,000

The High-Heel Wedding Church (Chinese: 高跟鞋教堂; pinyin: Gāogēnxié Jiàotáng) is a high-heel-shaped building in Budai Township, Chiayi County, Taiwan. It is managed by Southwest Coast National Scenic Area Administration.

== History ==
The construction was completed on 10 January 2016 and was opened for trial in February 2016. It was officially opened on 23 July 2016. Later in the same year, the church received the Guinness World Records certification as the world's largest high-heel shoe-shaped structure. In 2017, the Tourism Bureau planned to upgrade the facilities around the church and launch a series of promotions for the church.

== Architecture ==
The building is shaped like a high-heel shoe 17.76 meters in height, 11.91 meters in width, and 25.16 meters in length. It is composed of over 300 pieces of blue-tinted glass.

== Events ==
The place is famous for its use as a wedding venue. Though colloquially referred to as a 'church', the building is not consecrated and has no religious function.

== See also ==
- List of tourist attractions in Taiwan
