= Nanjing railway station (Taiwan) =

Railway station in Chiayi, Taiwan

Nanjing 南靖車站
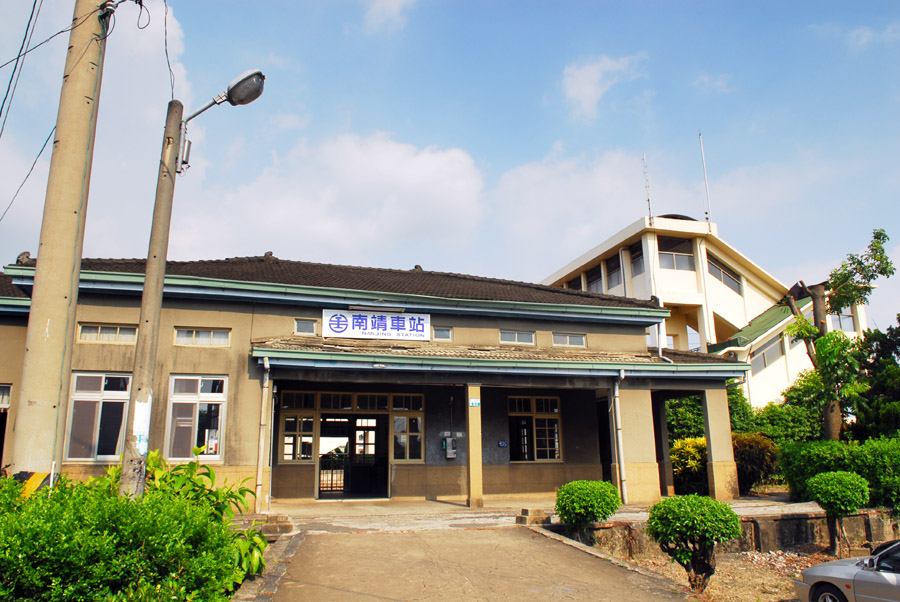

General information
- Location: Shuishang, Chiayi County, Taiwan
- Coordinates: 23°24′48.6″N 120°23′10.1″E
- System: Train station
- Owner: Taiwan Railway
- Operator: Taiwan Railway
- Line: Western Trunk line
- Train operators: Taiwan Railway

History
- Opened: 20 March 1911

Passengers
- 404 daily (2024)
Location

Nanjing station (Chinese: 南靖車站; pinyin: Nánjìng Chēzhàn) is a railway station on Taiwan Railway West Coast line located in Shuishang Township, Chiayi County, Taiwan.

== History ==
The station was opened on 20 March 1911.

== See also ==
- List of railway stations in Taiwan

Preceding station	Taiwan Railway	Following station
Shuishang towards Keelung	Western Trunk line	Houbi towards Pingtung
