= Dongshi Fisherman's Wharf =

Wharf in Dongshi, Chiayi County, Taiwan

Dongshi Fisherman's Wharf 東石漁人碼頭
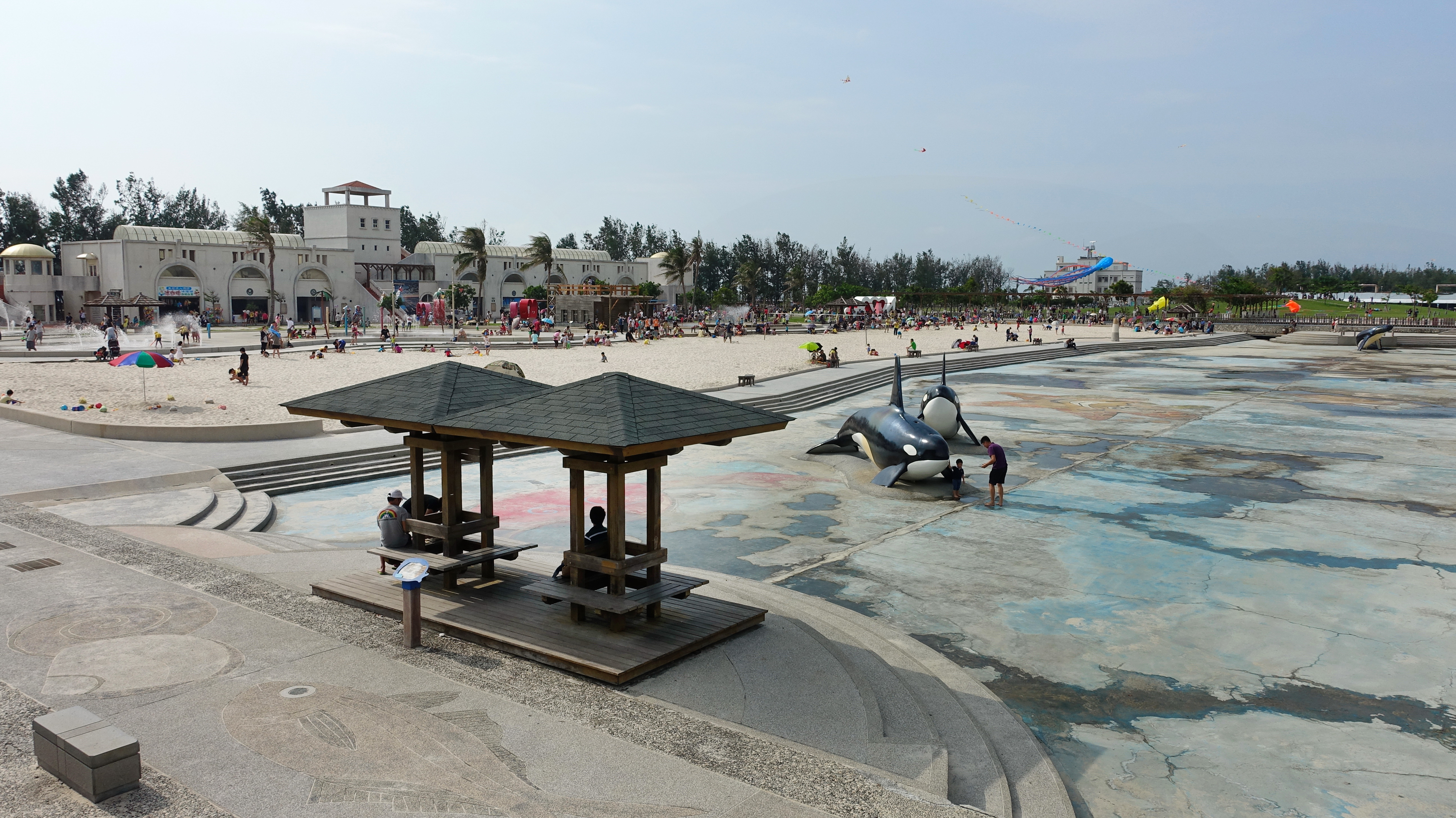
- Interactive map of Dongshi Fisherman's Wharf 東石漁人碼頭
- Location within Taiwan

Location
- Location: Dongshi, Chiayi County, Taiwan
- Coordinates: 23°26′56.0″N 120°08′09.3″E

Details
- Type of Harbor: wharf

The Dongshi Fisherman's Wharf (traditional Chinese: 東石漁人碼頭; simplified Chinese: 东石渔人码头; pinyin: Dongshi Yúrenmatou) is a fisherman's wharf in Dongshi Township, Chiayi County, Taiwan.

== History ==
After Taiwan joined World Trade Organization on 1 January 2002, the government realized the need to reform and change Taiwan traditional fishing industries towards recreational-oriented business to face the competition from Mainland China. Taking the advantage of the environment of Dongshi Township, the government transformed a fishing port in the township to become the multipurpose Dongshi Fisherman's Wharf.

== Architecture ==
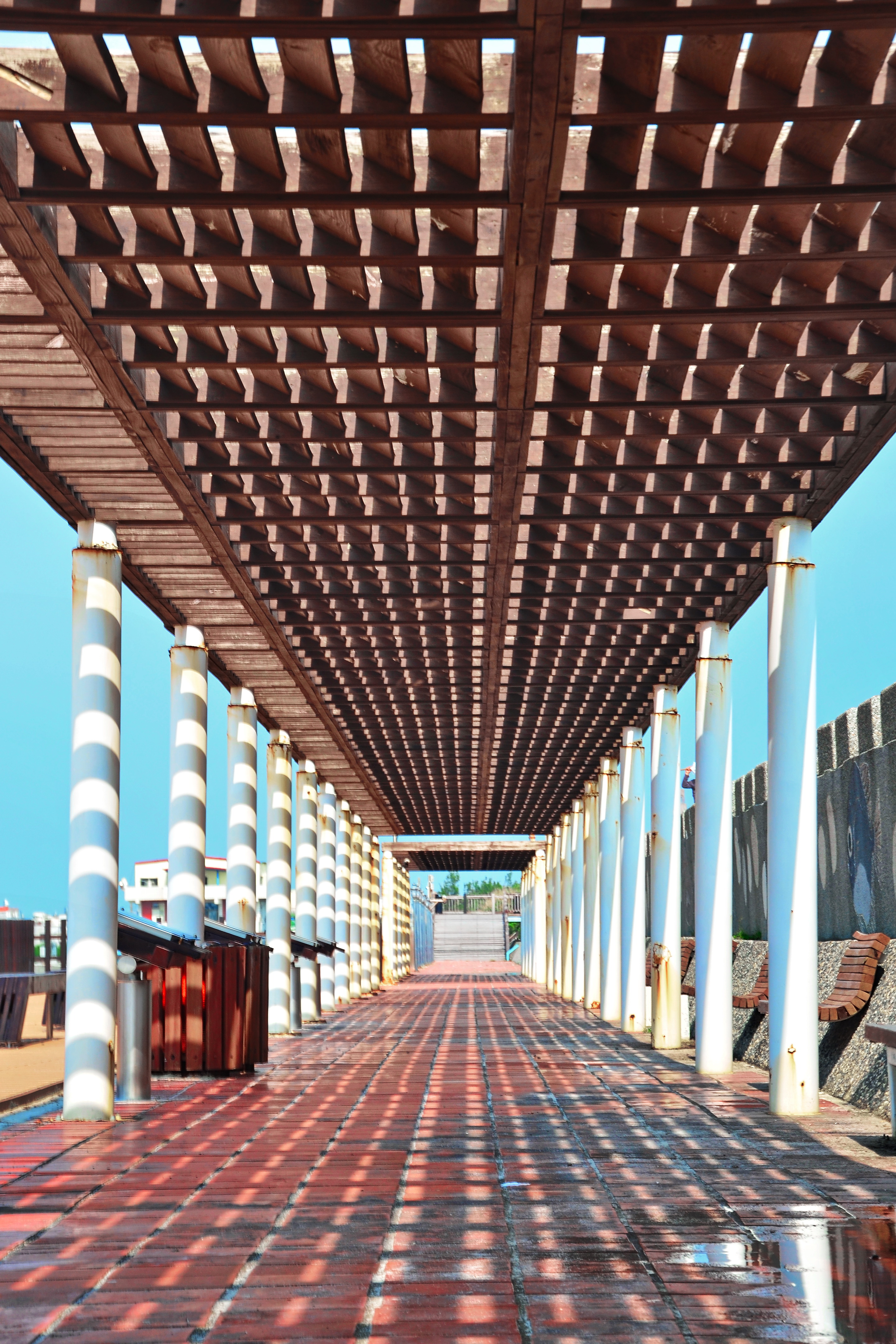
Dongshi Fisherman's Wharf

- Ocean Culture Hall
- Special Products Hall
- Shop Street
- Sea-Watching Pavilion
- Floating Bridge Market
- Coast Walking Platform

== Transportation ==
Bus
number	Operator	from	via	to	bus stop
7702	Chiayi Bus Co.LTD	Chiayi	THSR Chiayi Station	Dongshi Fisherman's Wharf	Dongshi Fisherman's Wharf

== Notable singers ==
- FanFan, Taiwanese singer

== See also ==
- Economy of Taiwan
