= Mei-Ling Fine Arts Museum =

Museum in Puzi, Chiayi County, Taiwan

- 梅嶺美術館
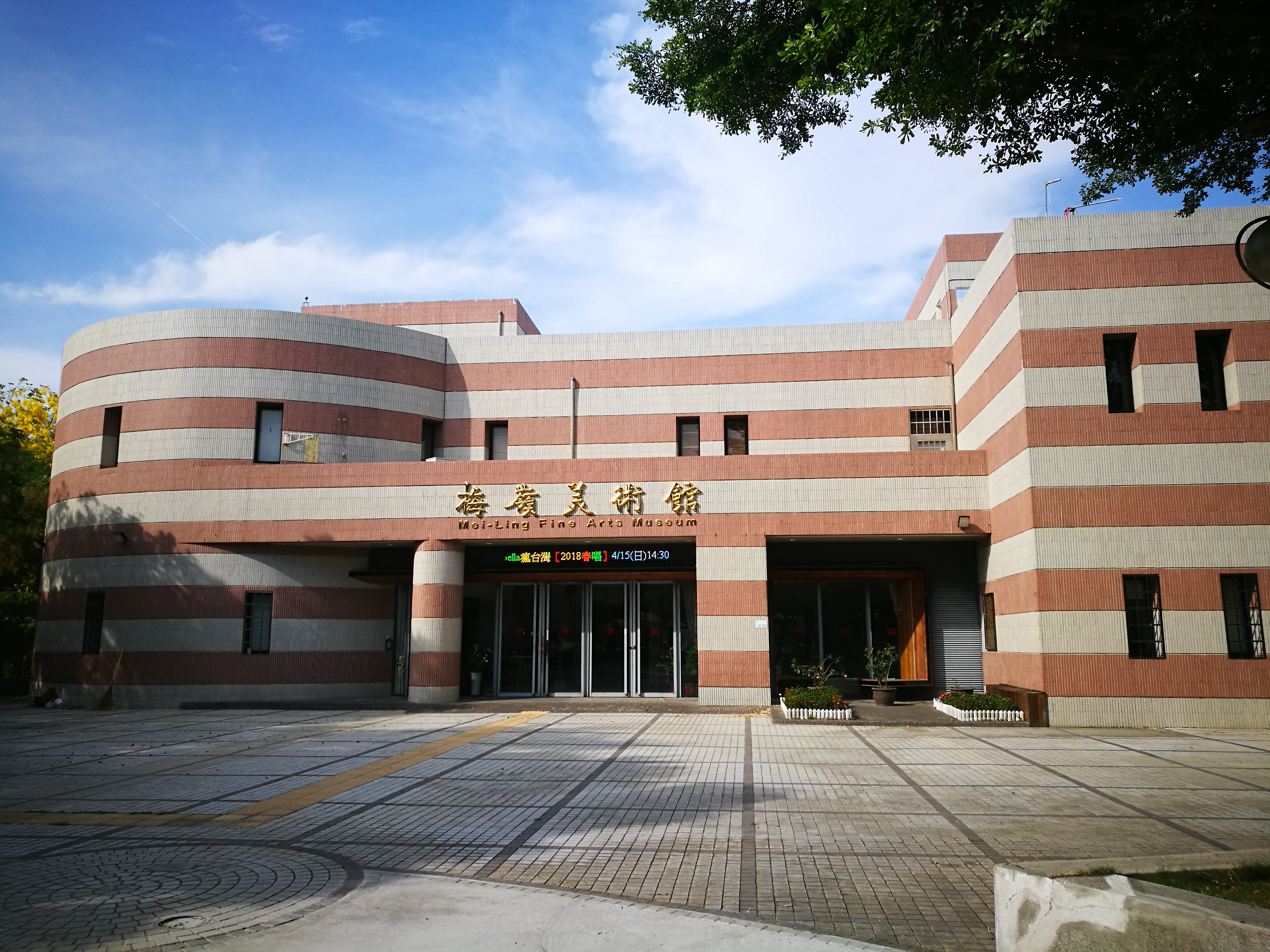
- Location: Puzi, Chiayi County, Taiwan
- Coordinates: 23°28′02.0″N 120°15′15.2″E
- Type: art museum

The Mei-Ling Fine Arts Museum (traditional Chinese: 梅嶺美術館; simplified Chinese: 梅岭美术馆; pinyin: Méilǐng Měishùguǎn) is an art museum in Puzi Art Park, Puzi City, Chiayi County, Taiwan.

== Architecture ==
The museum spans over an area of 1,653 m^{2}. The building consists of the administrative office, collection area, exhibition hall and four regions of learning classroom.

== Temporary exhibitions ==
- Tibetan and Mongolian Art and Culture

== See also ==
- List of museums in Taiwan
