= Haomeiliao Wetland =

Wetland in Budai, Chiayi County, Taiwan

- 好美寮濕地 (Chinese)
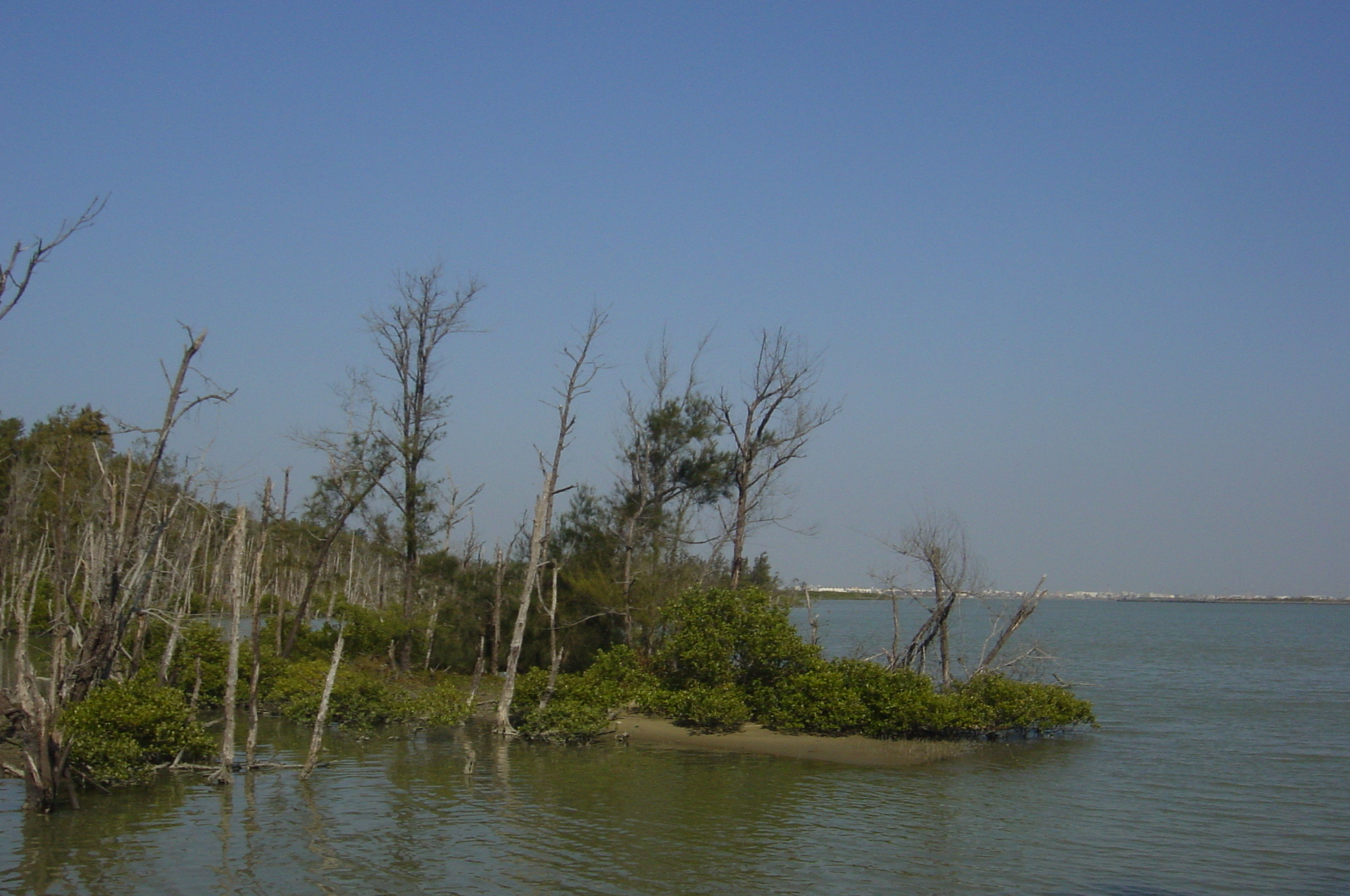

- Location within Chiayi County
- Location: Budai, Chiayi County, Taiwan
- Coordinates: 23°22′04.8″N 120°08′01.4″E
- Type: wetland
- Surface area: 959 hectares (2,370 acres)

The Haomeiliao Wetland (traditional Chinese: 好美寮濕地; simplified Chinese: 好美寮湿地; pinyin: Hǎoměiliáo Shīdì) is a wetland in Budai Township, Chiayi County, Taiwan.

== History ==
The wetland was declared a nature reserve in 1985 by the Construction and Planning Agency of the Ministry of the Interior. In 1987, a large portion of mangroves were cut down and the remaining have slowly died due to land subsidence. In 1998, the Executive Yuan designated the wetland to be a natural reserve area.

== Geography ==
The wetland is located at Longgong Estuary and it spreads across 959 hectares of area.

== See also ==
- Geography of Taiwan
