= Xikou Township Cultural Life Center =

Cultural center in Xikou, Chiayi County, Taiwan

- 溪口鄉文化生活館
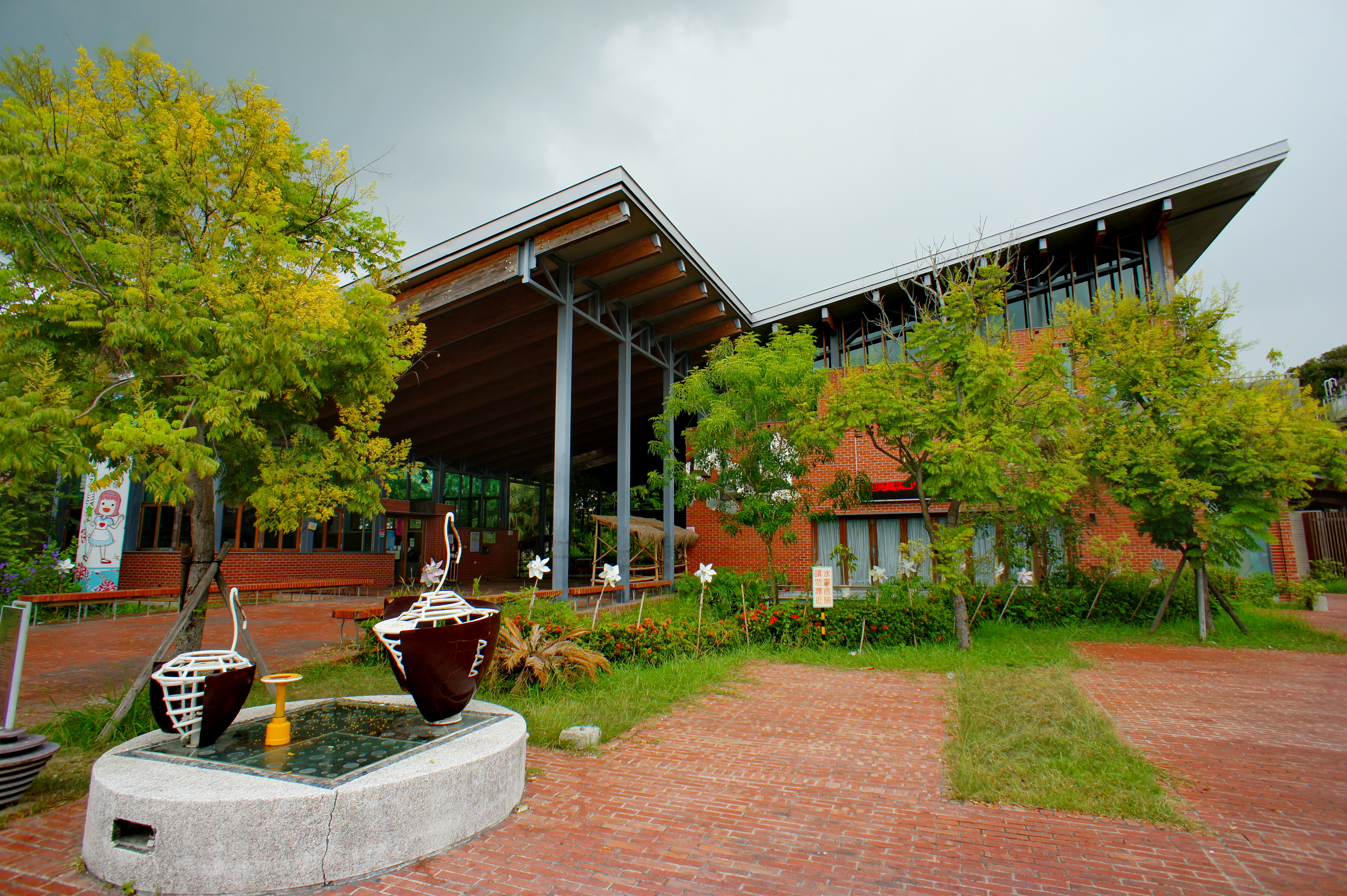
- Interactive map of the Xikou Township Cultural Life Center area

General information
- Type: cultural center
- Location: Xikou, Chiayi County, Taiwan
- Coordinates: 23°36′11.5″N 120°23′36.0″E
- Construction started: 2005
- Completed: 28 December 2007

The Xikou Township Cultural Life Center (traditional Chinese: 溪口鄉文化生活館; simplified Chinese: 溪口乡文化生活馆; pinyin: Xīkǒu Xiāng Wénhuà Shēnghuó Guǎn) is a cultural center in Xikou Township, Chiayi County, Taiwan.

== History ==
The construction of the center started in 2005 and was completed on 28 December 2007.

== Transportation ==
The center is accessible west of Dalin Station of Taiwan Railway.

== See also ==
- List of tourist attractions in Taiwan
