= Chiayi County =

County in Taiwan

Chiayi County 嘉義縣 Ka-gi, Chiai
- County
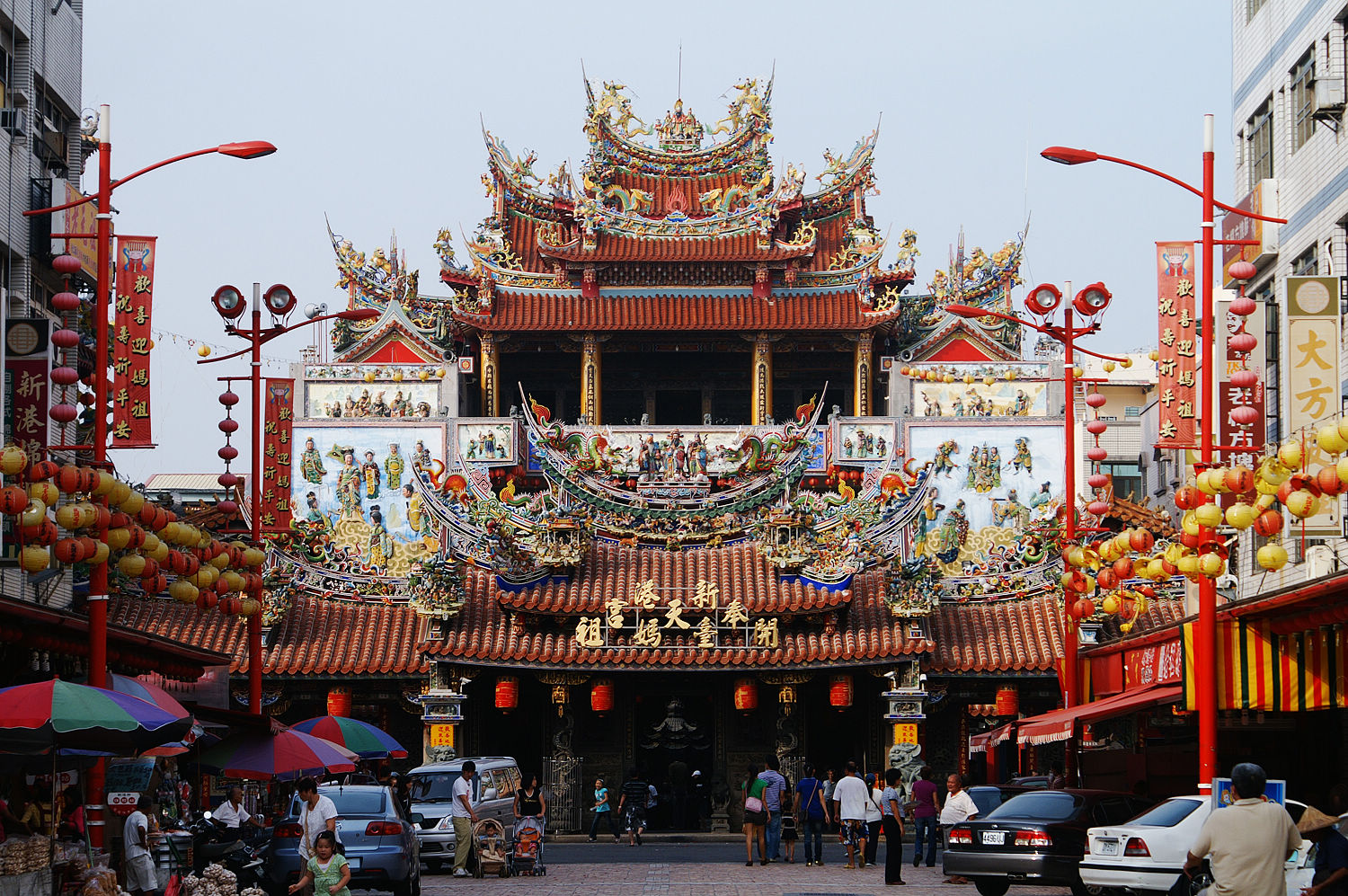
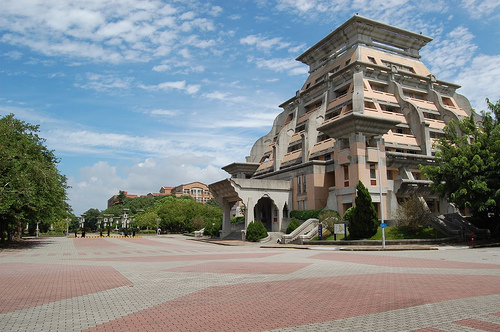
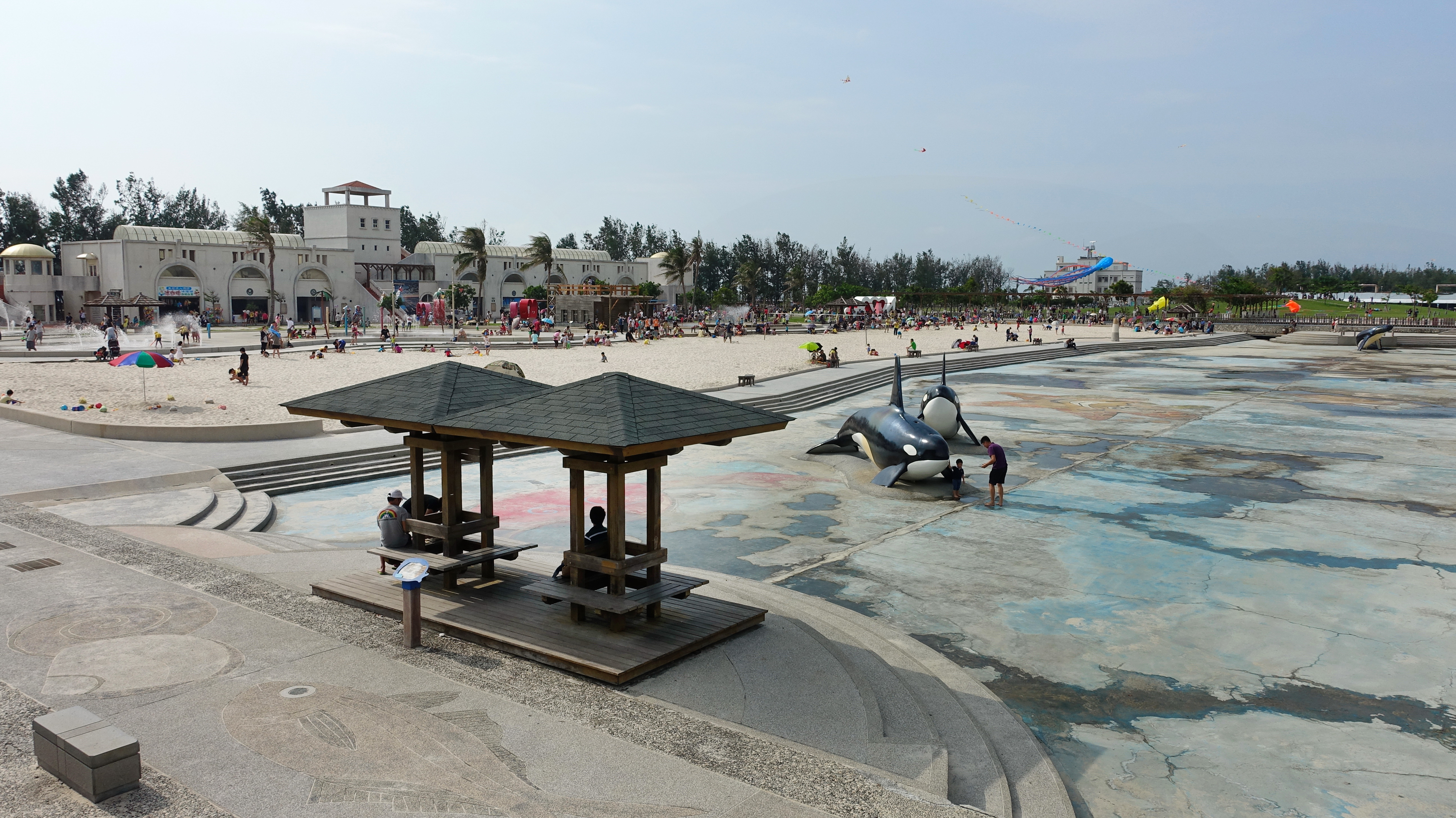
- Sunrise at Zhushan in the Alishan National Scenic Area Fengtian Temple National Chung Cheng University National Radio Museum Tropic of Cancer Monument Dongshi Fisherman's Wharf NPMSB

- Flag Logo
- Interactive map of Chiayi County
- Coordinates: 23°29′46.34″N 120°38′30.75″E
- Country: Taiwan
- Province: Taiwan (Note: In Taiwan, provinces remain a nominal division according to the Taiwanese constitution, but are no longer considered to have any administrative function practically.)
- Region: Southwestern Taiwan
- Seat: Taibao City
- Largest city: Minxiong
- Boroughs: 2 cities, 16 (2 urban, 14 rural) townships

Government
  - County Magistrate: Weng Chang-liang (DPP)

Area
  - Total: 1,901.67 km^{2} (734.24 sq mi)
  - Rank: 10 of 22

Population (January 2023)
  - Total: 488,012
  - Rank: 14 of 22
  - Density: 256.623/km^{2} (664.650/sq mi)
- Time zone: UTC+8 (NST)
- ISO 3166 code: TW-CYQ
- Website: cyhg.gov.tw

Chiayi County
- Traditional Chinese: 嘉義縣
- Simplified Chinese: 嘉义县
- Wade–Giles: Chia¹-i⁴ Hsien⁴
- Hanyu Pinyin: Jiāyì Xiàn
Transcriptions
Standard Mandarin
- Hanyu Pinyin: Jiāyì Xiàn
- Bopomofo: ㄐㄧㄚ ㄧˋ ㄒㄧㄢˋ
- Gwoyeu Romatzyh: Jiayih Shiann
- Wade–Giles: Chia¹-i⁴ Hsien⁴
- Tongyong Pinyin: Jiayì Siàn
- Yale Romanization: Jyāyì Syàn
- MPS2: Jiāyì Shiàn
- IPA: [tɕjá.î ɕjɛ̂n]
Hakka
- Pha̍k-fa-sṳ: Kâ-ngi-yen
Southern Min
- Hokkien POJ: Ka-gī-koān
- Tâi-lô: Ka-gī-kuān

Chiayi is a county in Taiwan. Located in southwestern Taiwan surrounding but not including Chiayi City, it is the sixth largest county in the island of Taiwan. Its major tourist destination is Alishan National Scenic Area.

== Name ==
The former Chinese placename was Tsu-lo-san (Chinese: 諸羅山; pinyin: Zhūluóshān; Pe̍h-ōe-jī: Chu-lô-san), a representation of the original Formosan-language name Tirosen. A shortened version, Tsulo, was then used to name Tsulo County, which originally covered the underdeveloped northern two-thirds of the island. In 1704, the county seat was moved to Tsulosan, the site of modern-day Chiayi City. Following the 1723 Zhu Yigui rebellion, the county was reduced in size. In 1787, the county and city were renamed Chiayi (嘉義; lit. 'commended righteousness') by the Qianlong Emperor to acknowledge the citizens' loyalty during the Lin Shuangwen rebellion.

== History ==
=== Qing dynasty ===
Chiayi County was originally part of Zhuluo County during the Qing dynasty. It was given its modern name by the Qianlong Emperor after the Lin Shuangwen rebellion in 1788 for its role in resisting the rebels.

=== Empire of Japan ===
From 1920, during the Japanese rule of Taiwan, the area of Tainan Prefecture covered modern-day Chiayi County, Chiayi City, Tainan and Yunlin County.

=== Republic of China ===
After the handover of Taiwan from Japan to the Republic of China on 25 October 1945, the area of present-day Chiayi County was administered under Tainan County. In October 1950, Chiayi County was established as a county of Taiwan Province. Chiayi City was designated as the county seat.

In July 1982, Chiayi City was upgraded to a provincial city, thus in December 1981, Chiayi County government relocated the county seat to Dongshiliao Farm in Taibao Township.

In March 1989, Wufong Township was renamed Alishan Township. In July 1991, Taibao Township was reorganized as Taibao City. In November 1991, Chiayi County government relocated the county seat from Dongshiliao Farm to Hsiangho New Village in Taibao City. Puzi Township was reorganized as a county-administered city in September 1992.

== Geography ==
Chiayi County borders Mount Yu to the east, Taiwan Strait to the west, Tainan City to the south and Yunlin County to the north. It spans over 1,903 km^{2} (735 sq mi), about 5.35% of the area of Taiwan. Chiayi County is located along the Tropic of Cancer.

== Administration ==
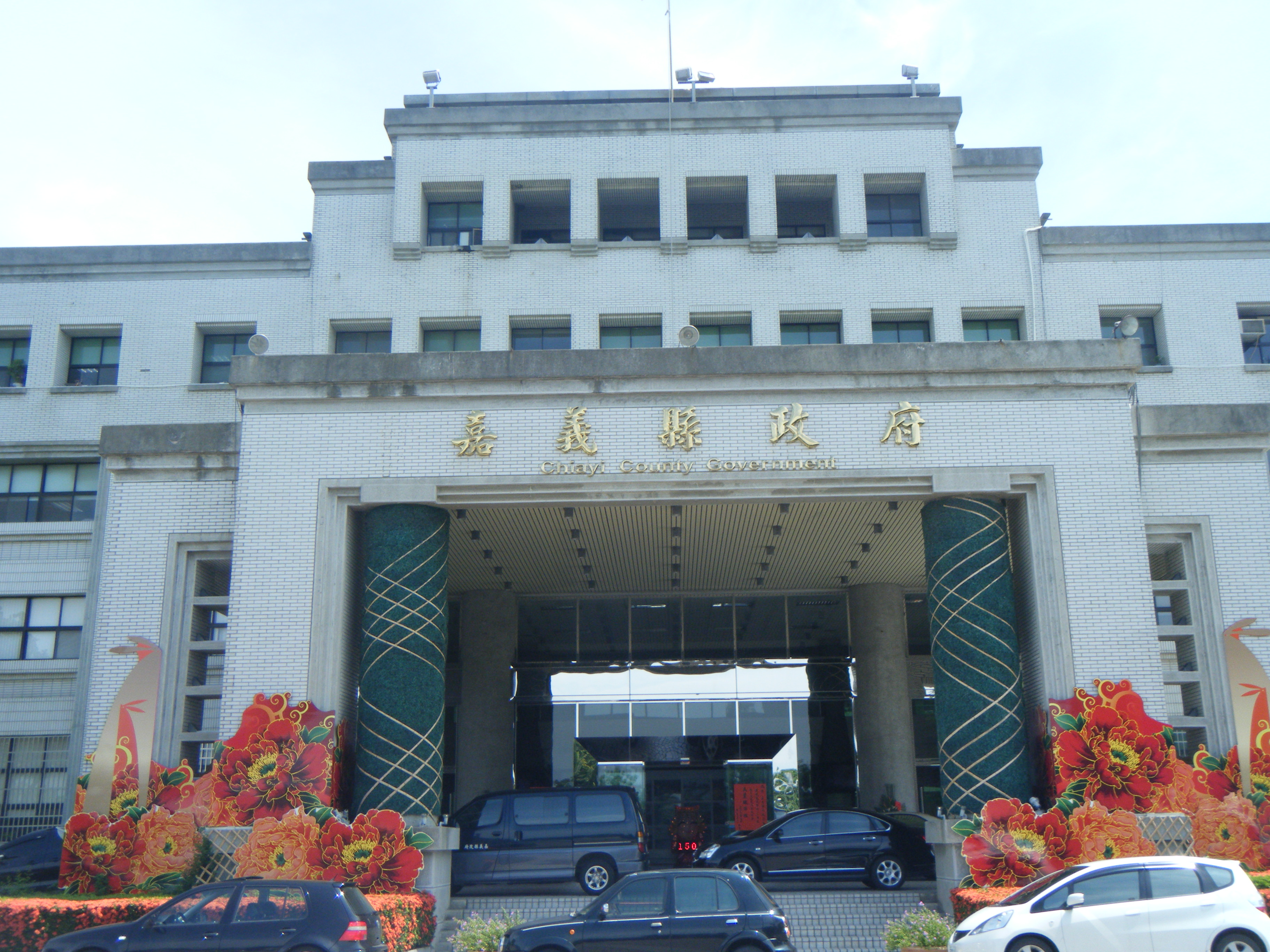
Chiayi County Government

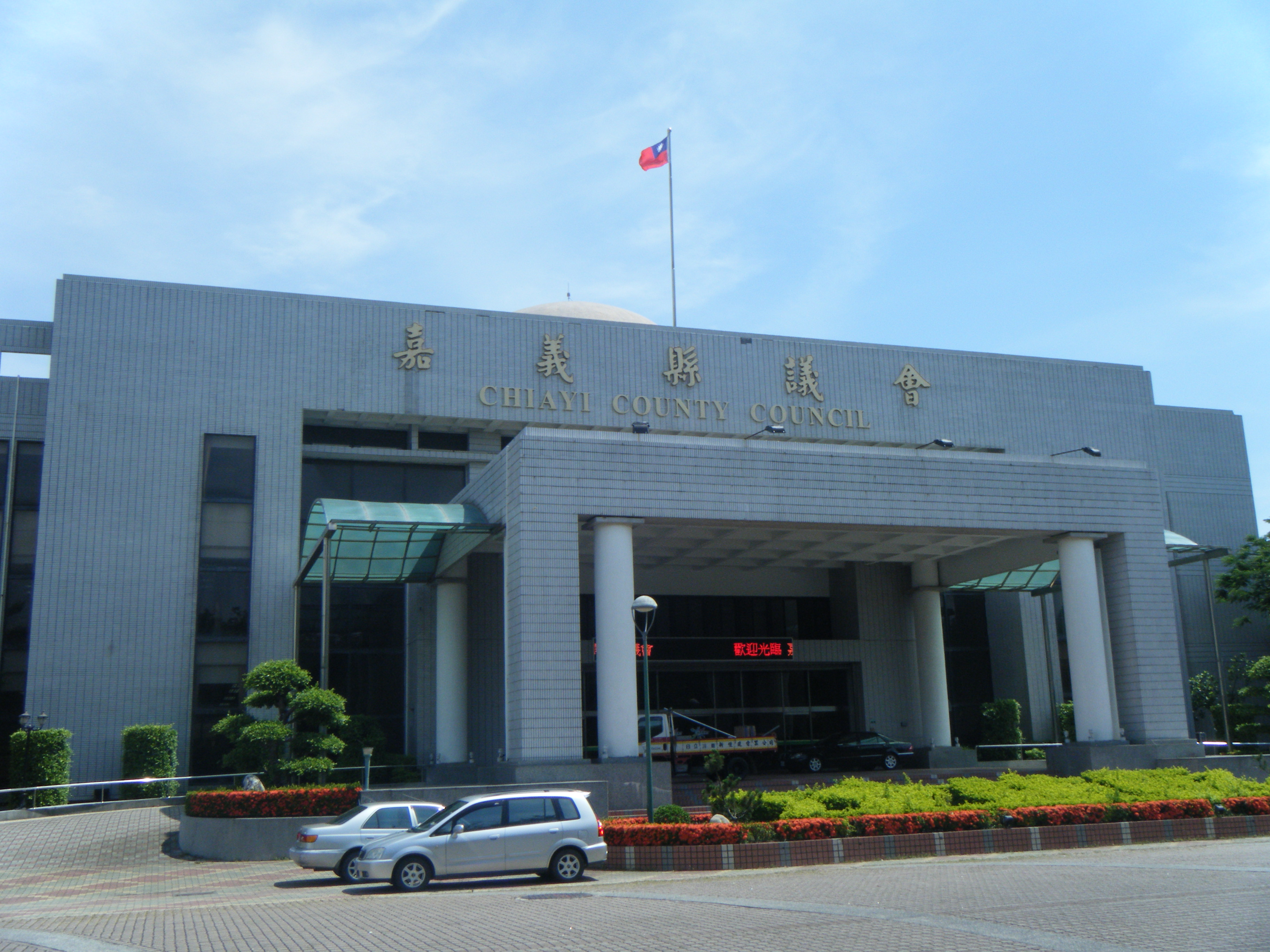
Chiayi County Council

Chiayi County is divided into 2 cities, 2 urban townships, 13 rural townships and 1 mountain indigenous township. Taibao City is the seat of Chiayi County and is home to Chiayi County Government. The Chiayi County Council is however located in Puzi City. Weng Chang-liang of the Democratic Progressive Party is the incumbent Magistrate of Chiayi County.

| Type | Name | Chinese | Taiwanese | Hakka | Formosan |
|---|---|---|---|---|---|
| Cities | Taibao City | 太保市 | Thài-pó | Thai-pó | |
| Cities | Puzi (Puzih) City | 朴子市 | Phoh-chú | Phú-chṳ́ | |
| Urban townships | Budai | 布袋鎮 | Pò͘-tē | Pu-thoi | |
| Urban townships | Dalin | 大林鎮 | Tōa-nâ | Thai-lìm | |
| Rural townships | Dapu | 大埔鄉 | Tōa-po͘ | Thai-phû | |
| Rural townships | Dongshi (Dongshih) | 東石鄉 | Tang-chio̍h | Tûng-sa̍k | |
| Rural townships | Fanlu | 番路鄉 | Hoan-lō͘ | Fân-lu | |
| Rural townships | Lioujiao (Liujiao) | 六腳鄉 | La̍k-kha | Liuk-kiok | |
| Rural townships | Lucao | 鹿草鄉 | Lo̍k-chháu | Lu̍k-tshó | |
| Rural townships | Meishan | 梅山鄉 | Mûi-san | Mòi-sân | |
| Rural townships | Minxiong (Minsyong) | 民雄鄉 | Bîn-hiông | Mìn-hiùng | |
| Rural townships | Shuishang (Shueishang) | 水上鄉 | Chhúi-siāng | Súi-song | |
| Rural townships | Xikou (Sikou) | 溪口鄉 | Khe-kháu | Hâi-khiéu | |
| Rural townships | Xingang (Singang) | 新港鄉 | Sin-káng | Sîn-kóng | |
| Rural townships | Yizhu (Yijhu) | 義竹鄉 | Gī-tek | Ngi-tsuk | |
| Rural townships | Zhongpu (Jhongpu) | 中埔鄉 | Tiong-po͘ | Chûng-phû | |
| Rural townships | Zhuqi (Jhuci) | 竹崎鄉 | Tek-kiā | Tsuk-khì | |
| Mountain indigenous township | Alishan | 阿里山鄉 | A-lí-san | Â-lî-sân | Psoseongana^{Tsou} |

Color indicates statutory language status of the Formosan language in the respective subdivision.

== Demographics ==
Historical population
| Year | Pop. | ±% |
|---|---|---|
| 1946 | 433,415 | — |
| 1950 | 526,052 | +21.4% |
| 1955 | 618,098 | +17.5% |
| 1960 | 710,273 | +14.9% |
| 1965 | 793,110 | +11.7% |
| 1970 | 849,914 | +7.2% |
| 1975 | 840,664 | −1.1% |
| 1980 | 825,967 | −1.7% |
| 1985 | 569,932 | −31.0% |
| 1990 | 552,277 | −3.1% |
| 1995 | 565,804 | +2.4% |
| 2000 | 562,305 | −0.6% |
| 2005 | 553,841 | −1.5% |
| 2010 | 543,248 | −1.9% |
| 2015 | 519,839 | −4.3% |
| 2020 | 499,481 | −3.9% |
| 2025 | 473,181 | −5.3% |
Source: 1. "嘉義縣五年來戶口動態比較表 (1946-1950)" (pdf). 嘉義縣統計年報 (Report) (in Chinese (Taiwan)). Vol. 中華民國39年度[40. 6]. 嘉義縣政府. June 1951. p. 9.; 2. "嘉義縣現住人口籍貫 (1950-1961)" (pdf). 嘉義縣統計年報 (Report) (in Chinese (Taiwan)). Vol. 中華民國50年度(51. 6). 嘉義縣政府. June 1962. pp. 26–27.; 3. "嘉義縣現住人口按籍別分 (1956-1974)" (pdf). 嘉義縣統計要覽 (Report) (in Chinese (Taiwan)). Vol. 中華民國63年[64. 6]. 嘉義縣政府. June 1975. pp. 22–23.; 4. "縣市人口按性別及五齡組(63)" (in Chinese (Taiwan)). 內政部戶政司.

The current population of Chiayi County as of May 2022 is 490,423 people. The county has been experiencing a population decline since 2009 due to higher migration out of the county and a higher death rate than birth rate. In 2013, the birthrate in the county was 5.89, lower than the average in Taiwan of 8.91, and the second lowest after Keelung.

View source data.

== Education ==
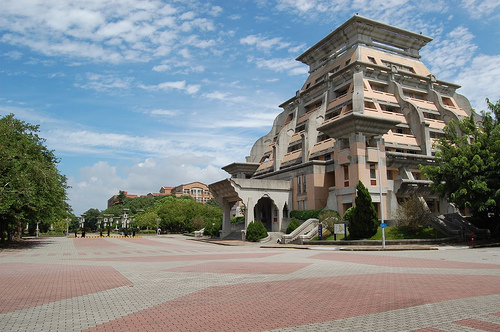
National Chung Cheng University

Chiayi County is home to the government-owned National Chung Cheng University and National Chiayi University. Private universities and colleges including Chang Gung University of Science and Technology, Nanhua University, Toko University and WuFeng University. Education-related affairs in the county is managed by the Educational Department of Chiayi County Government.

== Economy ==
Over the past 20 years, Chiayi County had often been left out in the regional economic development due to its less strategic location, lack of infrastructure and appropriate industrial land to attract manufacturers to set up factories in the area. All of the existing industrial parks in the county were built before 1981. Class 2 and class 3 industries have been developing slowly throughout Chiayi, thus the economic development is sluggish as well, resulting in slow urban development.

Three industrial parks named the Dapumei Industrial Park (大埔美工業區), Ma Chou Hou Industrial Park (馬稠後工業區) and Budai Intelligent Industrial Park are currently under planning in the county. Industrial parks in the neighboring counties and cities also contributed to the difficulty of industrial developments in Chiayi County.

== Energy ==
The Zengwen Hydroelectric Plant and Chiahui Gas-Fired Power Plant boasted the total national grid capacity of 50 MW and 670 MW respectively. Both of the power plants are located in the county.

Incinerator in the county is Lutsao Refuse Incineration Plant.

== Tourist attractions ==
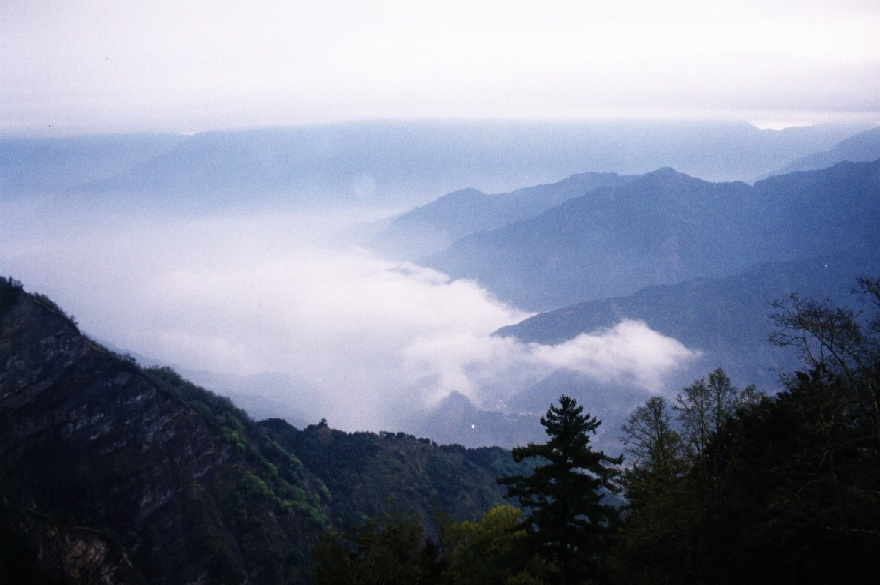
Alishan National Scenic Area

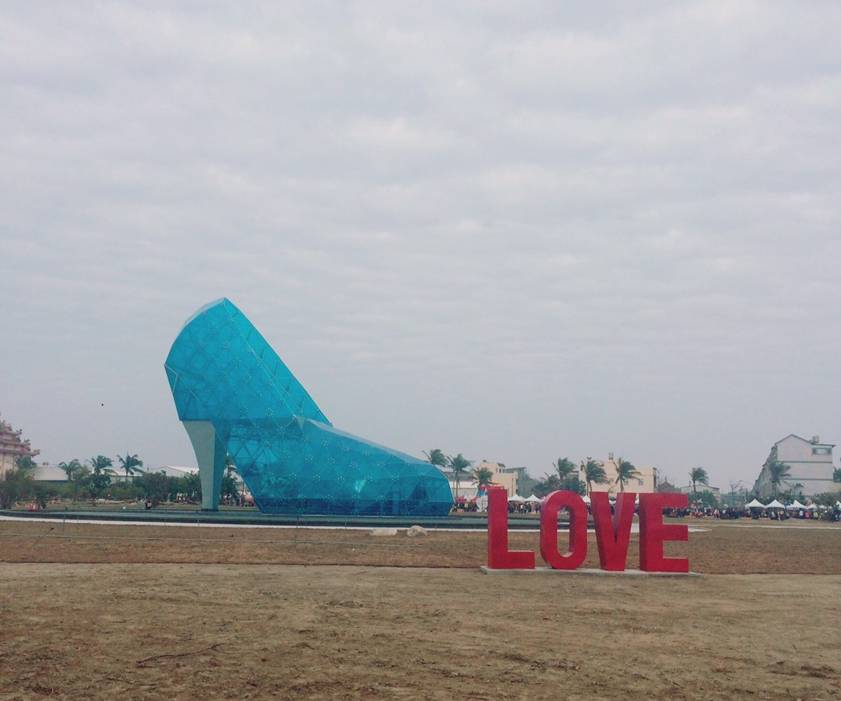
High-Heel Wedding Church

=== Museums ===
Notable museums, cultural centers and monuments in Chiayi County are the Dongshi Natural Ecological Exhibition Center, the Koji Pottery Museum, Mei-Ling Fine Arts Museum, National Radio Museum, Ping Huang Coffee Museum, Southern Branch of the National Palace Museum, Xikou Township Cultural Life Center and Tropic of Cancer Monument.

=== Natural ===
Bordered by mountains on one side and sea on the other side, Chiayi County holds three major national parks, which are Alishan National Scenic Area, Southwest Coast National Scenic Area and Siraya National Scenic Area, each represents a unique view of nature's wonders, from mountains, plains to ocean views. It also houses the Chukou Nature Center, Haomeiliao Wetland and Meishan Park.

=== Dams ===
Renyitan Dam and Zengwen Dam are located in the county.

=== Buildings ===
The county houses the Dongshi Fisherman's Wharf, Chiayi Performing Arts Center and High-Heel Wedding Church.

== Transportation ==
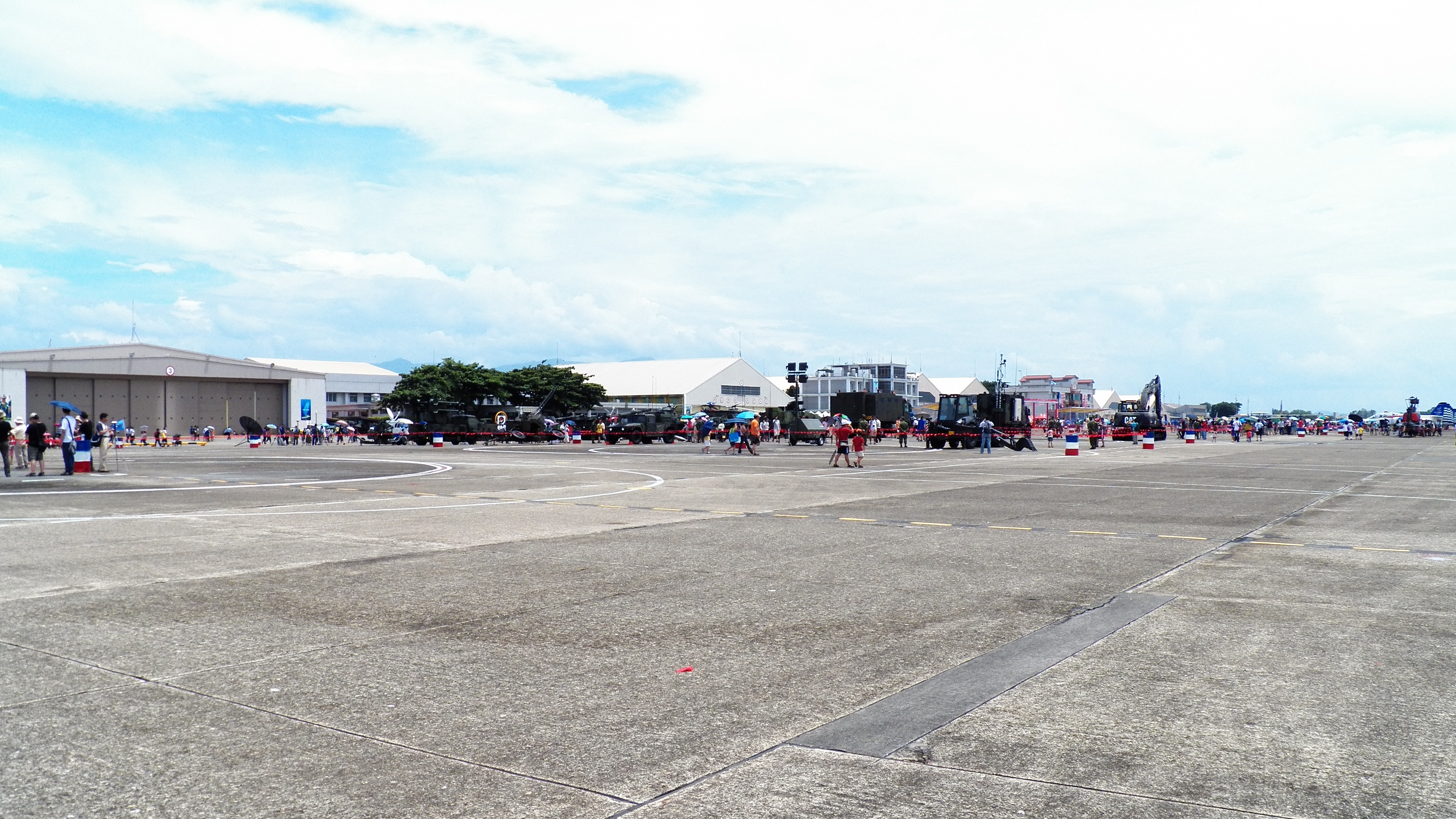
Chiayi Airport

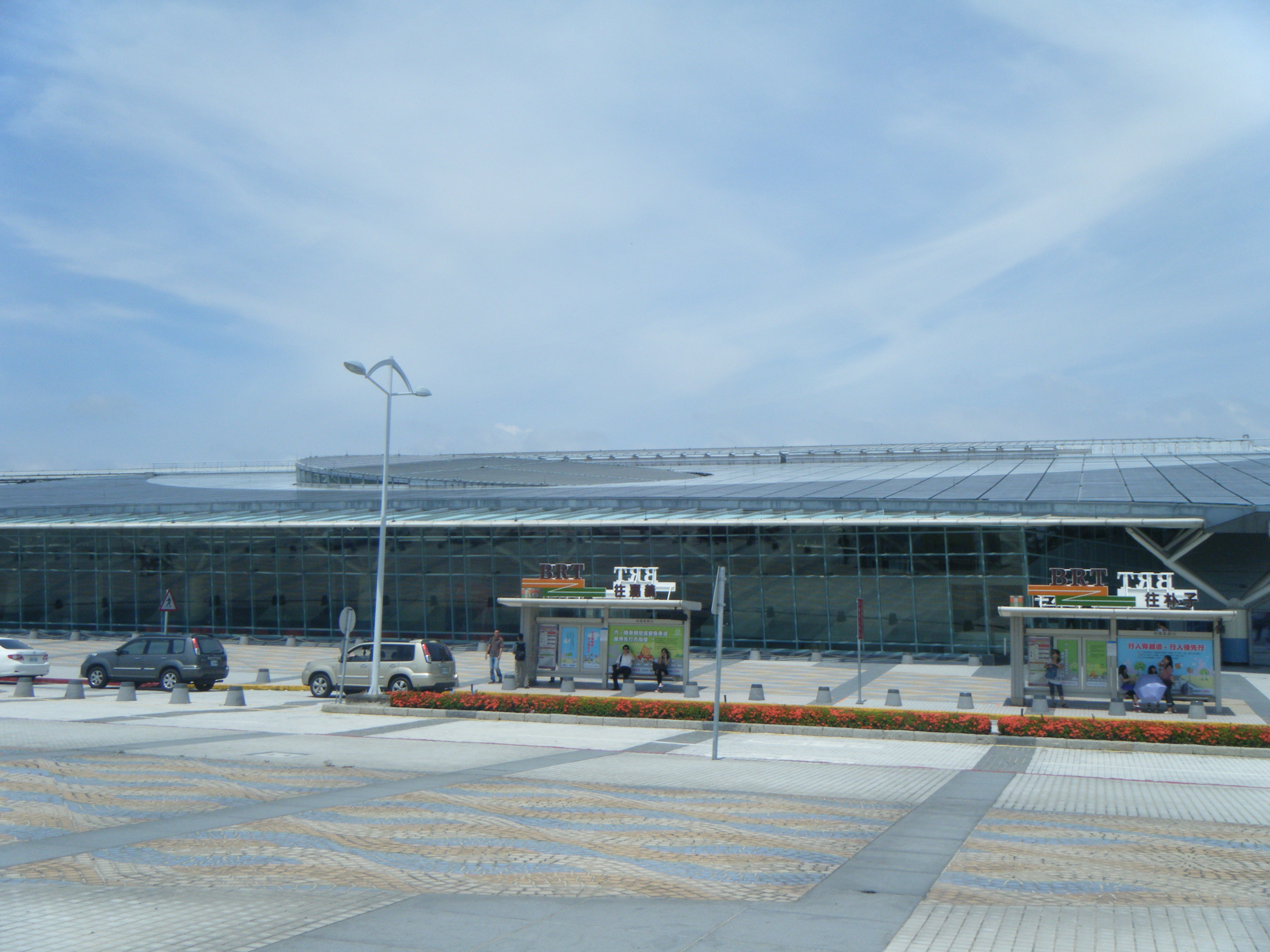
THSR Chiayi Station

=== Air ===
Chiayi County is served by Chiayi Airport, located at the junction of Shuishang Township, Taibao City and neighboring Chiayi City.

=== Rail ===
Taiwan High Speed Rail stops at Chiayi HSR Station in Taibao City. Taiwan Railway stations include the Dalin Station, Minxiong Station, Jiabei Station, Nanjing Station and Shuishang Station. The Alishan Forest Railway leads to Alishan National Scenic Area, with stations in Zhuqi Township, Meishan Township and Alishan Township.

=== Water ===
Budai Harbor in Budai Township provides ferry services to Magong City, Penghu.
