= Lin Chieh-liang =

Taiwanese toxicology expert, and food safety advocate

- 林杰樑
- Born: 30 June 1958; Puzi, Chiayi, Taiwan
- Died: 5 August 2013 (aged 55); Linkou, New Taipei, Taiwan
- Education: Taipei Medical University
- Known for: Public health advocacy and science communication
- Medical career
- Profession: Nephrologist, toxicologist
- Institutions: Chang Gung Memorial Hospital

Lin Chieh-liang (Chinese: 林杰樑; pinyin: Lín Jiéliáng; 30 June 1958 – 5 August 2013) was a Taiwanese physician, nephrologist and toxicologist. He was a longtime public health advocate and adviser to the Department of Health of the Republic of China, well known for his public response to national health scares.

== Education and medical career ==
Lin trained as a nephrologist at Taipei Medical University. He later worked at Chang Gung Memorial Hospital in Linkou, New Taipei, serving as the director of the hospital's toxicology department.

== Public health advocacy ==
Lin was a leading public health advocate, and one of Taiwan's best-known toxicologists. He gained a reputation as a public health expert and science communicator during a series of mass scares in Taiwan over health issues, including hornet attacks, lead poisoning and contaminated food. He regularly advised the Taiwanese Department of Health and Welfare on medical policy, food safety and potential threats to public health. Lin also conducted research into new vaccines and their effects on human health, and established a medical service team to provide free health consultations in poorer communities.

== Death ==
On 2 August 2013, Lin lapsed into a coma after contracting a lung infection; prior to this, he had undergone dialysis for 20 years due to renal problems. His condition rapidly worsened, and on 5 August he died, aged 55, of pneumonia and multiple organ failure at his former workplace, Chang Gung Memorial Hospital. The hospital subsequently set up a medical research fund in Lin's honour.
