= Chiayi County Government =

Government of Chiayi County, Taiwan

Coordinates: 23.4590°N 120.2935°E

- 嘉義縣政府; Jiāyì Xiàn Zhèngfǔ
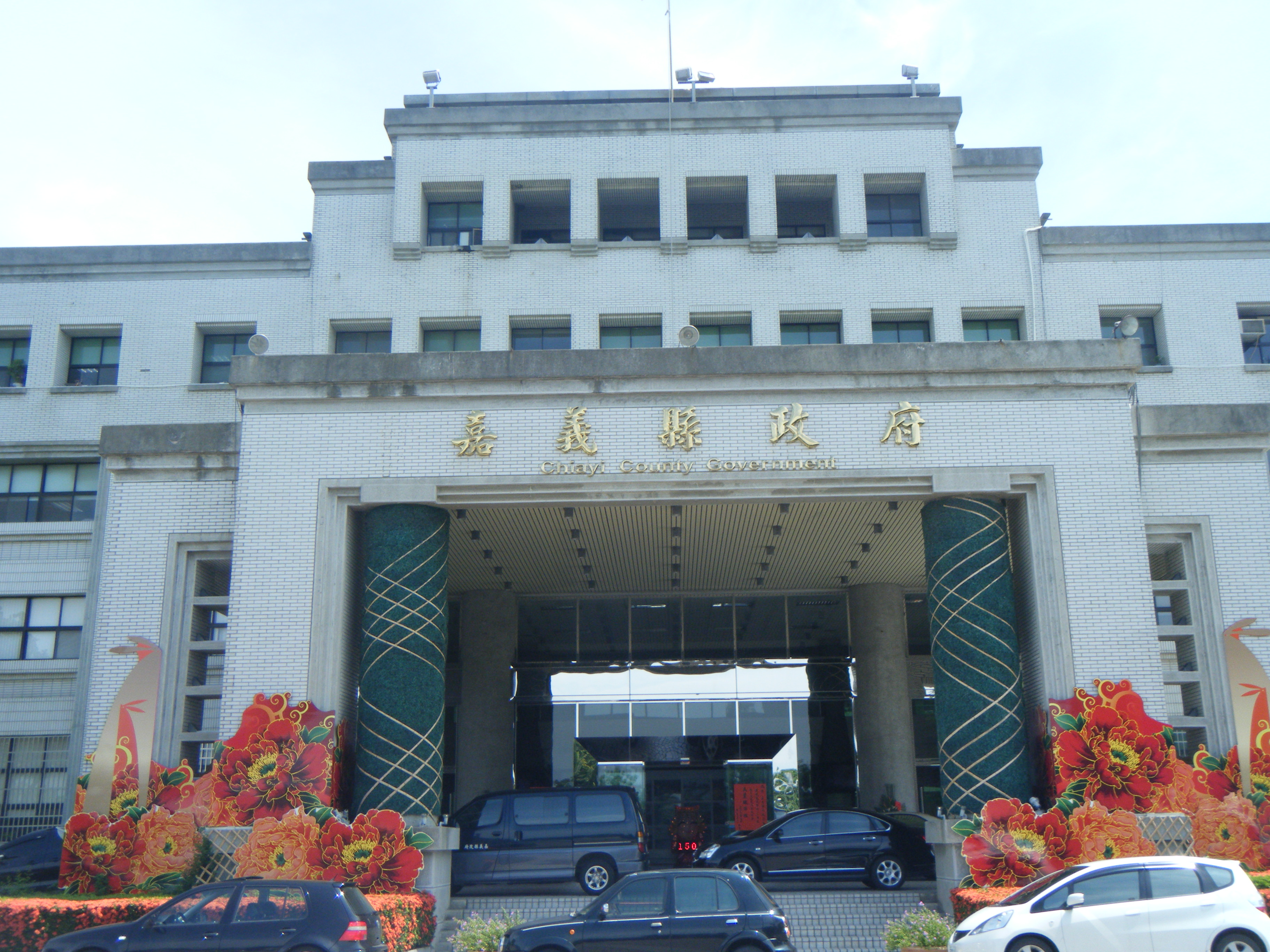
- Chiayi County Hall

Agency overview
- Formed: October 1950
- Jurisdiction: Chiayi County
- Headquarters: Taibao City
- Agency executive: Weng Chang-liang, Magistrate

The Chiayi County Government (CYHG; simplified Chinese: 嘉义县政府; traditional Chinese: 嘉義縣政府; pinyin: Jiāyì Xiàn Zhèngfǔ) is the local government of Chiayi County, Taiwan.

== History ==
The country government was formed in October 1950 by the Taiwan Provincial Government.

== Organization ==
- Accounting and Statistics Department
- Civil Affairs Department
- Personnel Department
- Planning Department
- Economic Development Department
- Construction Department
- Agriculture Department
- News Marketing Department
- Water Resources Department
- Land Administration Department
- General Affairs Department
- Educational Department
- Civil Service Ethics Department

== Transportation ==
The government building is accessible west from Chiayi Station of Taiwan High Speed Rail.

== See also ==
- Chiayi County Council
