= Chiayi County Council =

Legislature in Chiayi County, Taiwan

Coordinates: 23°27′33.9″N 120°17′29.4″E

Chiayi County Council 嘉義縣議會

Type
- Type: County Council

Leadership
- Speaker: Chang Ming-da since 2022
- Deputy Speaker: Chen Yi-yue since 2022

Structure
- Seats: 36
- Political groups: DPP (18); NPSU (11); KMT (8)

Elections
- Voting system: Single non-transferable vote
- Last election: 2022

Meeting place
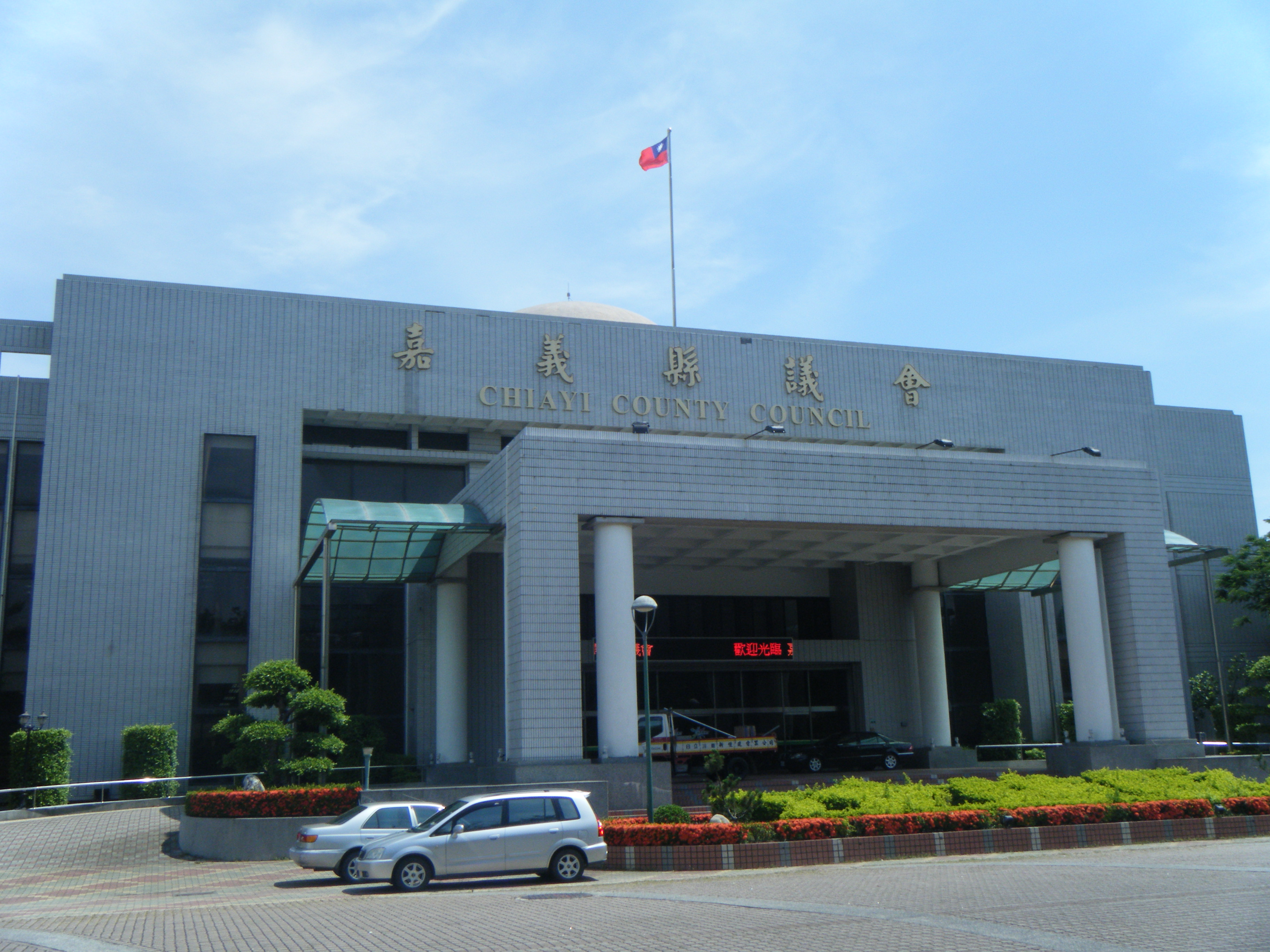
- Chiayi County Council building Puzi City, Chiayi County, Taiwan

The Chiayi County Council (CYSCC; traditional Chinese: 嘉義縣議會; simplified Chinese: 嘉义县议会; pinyin: Jiāyì Xiàn Yìhuì) is the elected county council of Chiayi County, Taiwan. The council consists of 37 councilors lastly elected through the 2022 Taiwanese local elections on 26 November 2022.

== History ==
The council was originally established as Chiayi City Council after the handover of Taiwan from Japan to the Republic of China in 1945. In 1950, administrative divisions of Taiwan Province were readjusted and the Chiayi County Council was subsequently established on 21 February 1951. The council moved to its current address in January 1992.

== Organization ==
- Speaker
- Deputy Speaker
- Secretary-General
- Secretary
- Administration Office
- Council Affairs Office
- General Affairs Office
- Accounting Office
- Legal Office
- Personnel Office

== Building ==
The council is located in a building that sits on 4.6 hectares of land. The building has a height of 24.65 meters which consists of 3 floors and 1 basement. The building was designed by Liao Jhao-kun and the construction was carried out by Sie Jian Cheng Construction Company. The groundbreaking ceremony for the building was held in April 1989 and was completed in November 1991.

== Speakers and deputy speakers ==
=== Speakers ===
- Huang Ci-sian (1951-1953)
- Wang Guo-jhu (1953-1958)
- Liu Wang-de (1958-1961)
- Huang Lao-dah (1961-1964)
- Lin Zhen-yong (1964-1968)
- Zhang Wen-zheng (1968-1977)
- Tsai Chang-ming (1977-1982)
- Chen Min-wen (1982-1986)
- Qiu Tian-chao (1986-1994)
- Shao Deng-biao (1994-1998)
- Dong Xiang (1998-2002)
- Hou Qing-he (2002-2006)
- Yu Zheng-da (2006-2014)
- Chang Min-da (2014-now)

=== Vice speakers ===
- Wu Yuan-jia (1951-1955)
- Lin Bao (1955-1958)
- Huang Ching-jiang (1958-1961)
- Jhang Wun-Jheng (1961-1964)
- Huang Shi-yong (1964-1968)
- Tsai Chang-ming (1968-1977)
- Liao Sheng-wei (1977-1982)
- Qiu Zhun-nan (1982-1986)
- Hou Yui-huang (1986-1990)
- Siao Deng-biao (1990-1994)
- Dong Xiang (1994-1998)
- Hou Qing-he (1998-2002)
- Yu Zheng-da (2002-2006)
- Zhang Ming-da (2006-2014)
- Chen Yi-yue (2014-now)

== Transportation ==
The council is accessible within walking distance west from Chiayi Station of Taiwan HSR.

== See also ==
- Chiayi County Government
