= List of accidents and incidents involving military aircraft (2020–present) =

This is a list of accidents and incidents involving military aircraft grouped by the year in which the accident or incident occurred. Not all of the aircraft were in operation at the time. Combat losses are not included except for a few cases denoted by singular circumstances.

== 2020 ==
=== January 2020 ===
2 January
A Sudanese Air Force Antonov An-12A crashes shortly after take-off from Geneina Airport, Khartoum. All eighteen people on board are killed.

2 January

Republic of China Air Force Sikorsky UH-60M Black Hawk 933 strikes a mountainside in Wulai District of northern Taiwan during a VIP transport mission, killing eight of 13 on board, including Shen Yi-ming, Chief of General Staff. The helicopter was on a routine mission to visit personnel at Dong'aoling Radar Station.

3 January

Sri Lanka Air Force Harbin Yunshuji Y-12 II SCL-857 crashes near Haputale, Sri Lanka. All four people on board are killed.

8 January
An Afghan National Army Mil Mi-35 crashes in Farah Province, Afghanistan, killing two pilots.

8 January
A Mil Mi-17 helicopter of the Afghan National Army crashes on take-off in Paktia Province, Afghanistan.

9 January
Lockheed C-130BZ Hercules 403 of the South African Air Force crashed on landing at Goma Airport, Democratic Republic of the Congo and was severely damaged. All 67 people on board survived.

9 January
Eight General Dynamics F-16 Fighting Falcons of the Israeli Air Force were damaged by flooding at Hatzor Airbase, Israel. Three aircraft were severely damaged, five were slightly damaged.

14 January
A General Dynamics F-16 Fighting Falcon aircraft crashes near Rafah, Egypt, killing the pilot.

19 January
A Mexican Air Force MD Helicopters MD 530F crashes on landing at El Zorillo Airport, Mexico. All five people on board survive.

21 January
Salvadoran Air Force ENAER T-35 Pillán FAS-74 crashes on approach to Ilopango International Airport. Both crew are killed.

22 January
Ghana Armed Forces CASA C-295M GHF552 overruns the runway on landing at Accra Air Force Base, Ghana.

25 January
A Sikorsky MH-60 Seahawk operating from USS Blue Ridge ditches in the Pacific Ocean 97 nautical miles (180 km) east of Okinawa, Japan. All five people on board are rescued.

27 January

USAF Bombardier Global Express E-11A 11-9358, of the 430th Expeditionary Electronic Combat Squadron, crashes in Dih Yak District, Afghanistan. Both people on board are killed.

27 January
A Croatian Air Force Bell OH-58 Kiowa crashes near Šibenik, Croatia. Both crew are killed.

28 January
An Algerian Air Force Sukhoi Su-30 crashes at Mechta Chimot, 8.6 nautical miles (16 km) from Aïn Zitoun, Algeria. Both crew are killed.

28 January
Uganda People's Defense Force Bell 206B Jet Ranger III AF302 crashes near Bulo, Gomba District, Uganda. Both crew are killed.

=== February 2020 ===
3 February
Indian Army HAL Cheetah Z1930 crashes in Jammu and Kashmir. Both pilots survive.

3 February
Indonesian Navy SOCATA TB-10 Tobago T-2405 ditches in a lake at Sidoarjo, East Java following an engine failure. Both occupants survive.

7 February
A Japan Ground Self Defense Force Bell UH-1 Iroquois crashes at Asahikawa Air Field and is severely damaged.

7 February
A Pakistani Air Force Dassault Mirage crashes shortly after taking off from Rafiqui Air Force Base. The pilot ejects safely.

17 February
An Afghan Army MD Helicopters MD530F is damaged in an emergency landing in the Khash Rod District. The pilot is injured.

19 February
A Russian Air Force Sukhoi Su-25UB catches fire and burns out at Lipetsk-2 Air Base. Both crew survive.

21 February
An Indian Navy Mikoyan MiG-29K crashes into the Arabian Sea off Goa. The pilot ejects safely.

24 February
National Cadet Corps Pipistrel Virus W-3936 crashes at Patiala Airport, India. One of the two people on board are killed.

27 February
Spanish Air Force CASA C-101 E.25-65 crashes into the sea in front of "La Manga", Region of Murcia, killing the pilot and leader of aerobatic demonstration team Patrulla Águila.

27 February
Colombian Air Force Bell UH-1 Iroquois FAC4420 crashes in Bojacá, Cundinamarca Department whilst en route from Melgar to Madrid, Colombia. Three of the five people on board are killed.

27 February
Belize Defence Force Bell UH-1 Iroquois BDF-12 crashes near Gales Point. All four people on board are killed.

=== March 2020 ===
2 March
A United States Army General Atomics MQ-1 Predator drone crashed near Agadez, Niger due to a mechanical failure.

6 March
A Myanmar Air Force Mil Mi-17 helicopter crashed in Kutkai Township, injuring several of the 15 people on board.

11 March
Pakistani Air Force General Dynamics F-16 Fighting Falcon 92730 crashes at Islamabad, killing the pilot.

18 March
Armée de l'Air Ivorienne Mil Mi-24D TU-VHR crashes at Félix-Houphouët-Boigny International Airport. Two people are injured.

21 March
Fuerza Aérea Boliviana Zlín Z 242 FAB-518 crashes at Chimore Airport whilst performing aerobatics. Both people on board are killed.

21 March
A Mexican Navy Sikorsky UH-60 Black Hawk helicopter crashes at Tepecuitlapa, Veracruz. One of the 21 people on board is killed, all 20 survivors are injured.

25 March
Russian Air Force Sukhoi Su-27 RF-94953 "09 Blue" crashes into the Black Sea off Crimea, killing the pilot.

25 March
A Russian Air Force Aero L-39 Albatros crashes in Krasnodar Krai, killing the pilot.

30 March

People's Liberation Army Harbin Z-9ZH 6202 crashes in Hong Kong. All four people on board are killed.

=== April 2020 ===
7 April
Malian Air Force Embraer A-29 Super Tucano TZ-04C crashes near Sévaré. Both people on board are killed.

13 April
Pakistan Army PAC MFI-17 Mushshak 83-5120 crashes in Gujrat, Punjab, Pakistan. At least two people are killed.

29 April
Royal Canadian Air Force Sikorsky CH-148 Cyclone 148822, of 423 Maritime Helicopter Squadron, call sign "Stalker 22", crashes in the Ionian Sea off the coast of Greece while returning to HMCS Fredericton (FFH 337) following a routine maritime surveillance mission, killing all six people on board.

=== May 2020 ===
8 May
Indian Air Force MiG-29 UPG of Squadron 223 crashes near Hoshiarpur, pilot ejected safely

15 May
United States Air Force F-22 Raptor from the 43rd Fighter Squadron, part of the 325th Fighter Wing departs Eglin Air Force Base in Florida and crashes at the base grounds, in the test and training range. Pilot ejected and was uninjured.

17 May
Royal Canadian Air Force Canadair Tutor 114161, of 431st Squadron, 15th Wing, Snowbirds display team crashes at Kamloops, British Columbia. One of the two crew members is killed.

19 May
United States Air Force F-35A from the 58th Fighter Squadron crashes while landing at Eglin AFB. The pilot ejected and was in stable condition.

=== June 2020 ===
6 June
An Indonesian Army Mi-17V-5 helicopter crashed and burnt in Kaliwungu, Kendal Regency, Central Java. Of the nine occupants, four died with the rest seriously injured.

15 June
A USAF F-15C from the 493rd Fighter Squadron, part of the 48th Fighter Wing crashes into the North Sea and the pilot was killed.

15 June
An Indonesian Air Force Hawk 209 jet fighter crashed in a residential area of Kampar, Riau. The pilot, First Lt. Apriyanto, was able to eject himself and survived the accident. He is being examined at dr. Soekirman Air Force Hospital in Pekanbaru.

=== July 2020 ===
21 July
A Sikorsky UH-60 Black Hawk of the Colombian Army crashed into the Inírida River, Guaviare Department. There were 17 occupants on board, 11 died and six were injured.

23 July
A Philippine Air Force Bell UH-1D crashed during take off at Cauayan Airport, Isabela Province. Four occupants died and one was injured.

29 July
A Royal Air Force Boeing Chinook helicopter hits power lines while flying low near Llangynin, Wales, and makes an emergency landing in a field. No one is injured.

=== August 2020 ===
5 August
A McDonnell Douglas A-4 Skyhawk of the Argentine Air Force crashed near Villa Valeria, Cordoba Province. The pilot managed to eject from the aircraft but was found dead not too far away from the site of the accident.

10 August
An Indonesian Air Force KAI T-50 Golden Eagle jet trainer skidded off the runway during takeoff at Iswahjudi Air Force Base, Magetan Regency, East Java. The two pilots ejected, one of them later died several weeks after the crash.

=== September 2020 ===
16 September
A Philippine Air Force Sikorsky S-76A crashed due to bad weather in Lantawan, Basilan. Four occupants died.

25 September

Ukrainian Air Force Antonov An-26 76 yellow, of the 203rd Training Aviation Brigade, carrying cadets of the Ivan Kozhedub National Air Force University, crashes and catches fire in Ukraine's Kharkiv Oblast while on approach to Chuhuiv Air Base. Of the 27 on board, only one survives.

25 September
Serbian Air Force MiG-21UM crashes in Brasina, near Mali Zvornik. Both people on board were killed and one person on ground was injured.

29 September
A USMC F-35B fighter jet crashed in Imperial County, California, after it collides with a Marine Corps KC-130 during air-to-air refuelling. The F-35B pilot was injured in the ejection, but the KC-130 crash-landed gear up in a field.

=== October 2020 ===
6 October

A Tunisian Air Force Northrop F-5E fighter jet crashed in Remada, in Tataouine Governorate, Tunisia. The sole pilot was killed in the accident.

20 October
A United States Navy Boeing F/A-18E Super Hornet crashes near Naval Air Weapons Station China Lake in California. The aircraft flew its mission from Naval Air Station Lemoore and its sole pilot could eject without sustaining injuries.

23 October
A United States Navy T-6B Texan II crashes near Magnolia Springs, Alabama killing the aircrew. No civilian injuries were reported, although the crash destroyed several cars and part of a residence. The plane flew from Naval Air Station Whiting Field in Milton, Florida, about 50 miles to the northeast.

29 October
A Taiwanese Air Force F-5E jet crashes off the island's eastern coast during routine training, killing the pilot, the second fatal air crash in three months.

=== November 2020 ===
12 November
A Sikorsky UH-60L Black Hawk operated by the U.S. Army as part of the Multinational Force and Observers (MFO) crashed near Sharm El Sheikh, Egypt, killing seven, five Americans, one Czech, and one French member of the MFO. In addition, one U.S. service member survived the crash with injuries.

17 November
A Royal Thai Army Bell 212 made an emergency landing due to engine trouble in Mae Chaem district, Chiang Mai Province and burned as it landed. Eleven occupants were safely evacuated, including the Vice Governor of Chiang Mai.

24 November
An Israeli Air Force Grob G 120 crashes near Mishmar HaNegev killing both the pilot and passenger. As of December 31, 2020, the cause of the accident could only be determined as "lack of control" without specifying if the "lack of control" was due to human errors or mechanical problems.

26 November
An Indian Navy MiG-29K crashes in the Arabian Sea. One of the pilots is recovered while the other remains missing. This flight was part of the MALABAR2020 Naval Exercise with the USN. The aircraft in question was flown off the deck of INS Vikramaditya aircraft carrier.

=== December 2020 ===
7 December
An Indonesian Air Force KT-1B Woongbi trainer aircraft crashed in Adisutjipto Air Force Base, Yogyakarta during training flight. The two pilots ejected safely.

9 December
A Wisconsin Air National Guard F-16 Fighting Falcon crashes in Michigan's Upper Peninsula during night training. The plane went down in the Hiawatha National Forest and the pilot was killed. The cause of the crash is still unknown.

15 December
A PT-6 trainer aircraft of the Sri Lanka Air Force crashed near Kantale, Sri Lanka, after taking off from China Bay Airport. The trainee pilot died in the accident.

== 2021 ==
=== January 2021 ===
16 January
A Philippine Air Force Bell UH-1H crashed due to engine issues in Impasugong, Bukidnon. All seven occupants died.

20 January
A New York Army National Guard UH-60 crashes in a farmer's field south of Rochester, New York during a routine training exercise. All three crewmembers aboard the aircraft were killed.

=== February 2021 ===
3 February
An Idaho Army National Guard UH-60 crashes 10 miles east of Boise, Idaho in bad weather during a routine training mission. All three crewmembers aboard the aircraft are killed.

9 February

A Cessna 402 of the Paraguayan Air Force crashed while it was trying to land at Silvio Pettirossi International Airport, killing 7 out of 8 occupants.

18 February
A USAF T-38A of the 9th Reconnaissance Wing crashed at Sacramento Mather Airport in California when the pilot raised the landing gear too early when taking off from a touch-and-go. The plane skidded to a stop on its belly allowing both pilots to leave uninjured.

19 February
A USAF T-38C trainer from the 50th Flying Training Squadron crashed in a wooded area near Montgomery Regional Airport, Alabama, killing both pilots.

21 February
A Nigerian Air Force Beechcraft King Air B350i NAF201 crashed while returning to Nnamdi Azikiwe International Airport, Abuja, Niger, after reporting an engine failure en route to Minna, Niger. The crash killed all 7 occupants on board.
A Learjet 45 operated by the Mexican Air Force crashed after taking off from the El Lencero Airport in Emiliano Zapata, Veracruz. All 6 occupants died and the aircraft was destroyed.

=== March 2021 ===
4 March

A Eurocopter AS532 helicopter crashes in southeast Turkey, killing eleven soldiers, including Lieutenant General Osman Erbaş, the commander of the 8th Corps, later died of wounds, and injuring three.

13 March
Kazakhstan Border Guards Antonov An-26 02 white crashes on landing at Almaty Airport; four occupants die and the two survivors reportedly suffer serious injuries. The cause of the accident is under investigation.

24 March
A Hongdu K-8VB jet trainer of the Bolivian Air Force crashed into a house in Sacaba, Bolivia, killing one person inside. Both pilots ejected safely from the aircraft.

25 March
A Royal Navy BAE Systems Hawk T1 crashes near St. Martin, 5 miles south east of Helston, Cornwall after a suspected engine power loss. Both pilots eject safely, and are airlifted to Derriford Hospital in Plymouth for checks and treatments. Early reports state that the crew may have sustained minor ("but not life threatening") injuries. The cause of the incident is under investigation.

=== April 2021 ===
7 April
A Northrop F-5 jet of the Turkish Stars aerobatic demonstration team crashed near Fevziçakmak, Karatay district, killing the pilot.

9 April
A KAI KT-1 training aircraft of the Turkish Air Force crashed off the coast of Foça, Izmir Province. Both pilots ejected from the aircraft and were rescued.

16 April
A Sukhoi Su-30SM of the Kazakh Air Defense Forces crashed while on approach to Balkhash Airport. Both pilots ejected safely from the aircraft.

17 April
A Mil Mi-17 helicopter of the Peruvian Army crashed into the Vilcanota River in the Department of Cusco, killing 7 of the 12 occupants on board.

20 April
A Mikoyan-Gurevich MiG-21 LanceR of the Romanian Air Force crashed in Mureș County. The sole pilot on board ejected safely from the aircraft.

23 April
An Augusta-Bell AB412 helicopter of the Air Force of Zimbabwe crashed in Arcturus, Mashonaland East, killing all three occupants on board and a child on the ground.

27 April
A McDonnell Douglas MD520 helicopter of the Philippine Air Force crashed into the sea off the coast of Getafe, Bohol Province. The pilot of the helicopter died while the other three crew members survived but were injured.

=== May 2021 ===
11 May
An Iranian Air Force ultralight training plane crash causing the death of both pilots in Arak airport.
17 May
Two United States Navy McDonnell Douglas T-45 Goshawk collided mid-air in Ricardo, Texas. One T-45 managed to land safely at Naval Air Station Kingsville while the crew of the other T-45 had to eject.
21 May
An Indian Air Force MiG-21 Bison fighter jet crashes in a village in Moga district, pilot Sq Leader Abhinav Choudhary ejected but died due to his injuries.

21 May

Nigerian Air Force Beechcraft King Air 350i NAF203 crashes near Kaduna International Airport. All eleven military personnel on board – including Army chief Lieutenant General Ibrahim Attahiru and four crew died in the crash.

26 May
Swiss Air Force Northrop F-5 Tiger trainer jet crashes near the ski resort of Melchsee-Frutt. The pilot managed to safely eject.

=== June 2021 ===
1 June
An Iranian Air Force Northrop F-5 malfunctions before takeoff causing the death of both pilots on board.

9 June
Bulgarian Air Force MiG-29UB crashes into the Black Sea during military exercises. Pilot was declared dead the next day. Weeks later the Bulgarian Navy recovered some of the wreckage, including the black box.

10 June
Myanmar Air Force Beechcraft 1900D 4610 crashes near Pyin Oo Lwin en route to Anisakan Airport from Naypyidaw, killing 12 of 16 on board.
A Mexican Air Force MD Helicopters MD530F sustained substantial damage when it was involved in an accident near Santa Lucía Airport, Santa Lucía, Zumpango, Mexico. The two occupants were injured.

23 June
A Sikorsky S-70i Black Hawk of the Philippine Air Force, crashed in Capas, Tarlac, during a night training exercise. All six occupants died.
24 June
A Kenya Air Force Mil Mi-17 crashes in Kajiado County and caught fire, all 10 occupants were killed.

=== July 2021 ===
1 July
Belgian Air Component (Belgian Air Force) F-16A lost control during takeoff from Leeuwarden Air Base and crashed into some empty office buildings of the same base. Pilot could eject on-time and only suffered light injuries.

4 July

Philippine Air Force C-130H Hercules 5125 crashes at Patikul, Sulu, Philippines while attempting to land at Jolo Airport; 53 people were killed, including 3 civilians on the ground and 50 others were injured, including 4 civilians on the ground.

16 July
US Navy MH-60S Knighthawk Longhorn 02 crashed during a search and rescue operation in the White Mountains, California. All of the four crew members were unhurt.

18 July
Nigerian Air Force Alpha Jet is shot down by bandits on the border between Zamfara and Kaduna states. Lieutenant Abayomi Dairo ejected and returned to a military base by his owns means after coming under fire and hiding in nearby settlements.

20 July
A Mirage 2000 fighter jet of the French Air Force crashed in Hombori, Mali. The two pilots on board ejected from the aircraft.

=== August 2021 ===
6 August
A Pakistan Air Force JF-17 trainer aircraft crashed near Attock during routine training mission. Both pilots ejected.

31 August
A US Navy(USN) MH-60S assigned to HSC-8 crashed off the coast of San Diego while conducting operations aboard USS Abraham Lincoln (CVN-72). 1 crew member survived, 5 were killed.

=== September 2021 ===
19 September
A US Navy (USN) T-45C Goshawk trainer aircraft crashes into a residential neighborhood in Lake Worth, Texas. Both pilots ejected and no injuries were reported on the ground. The training flight originated from Corpus Christi International Airport.

21 September
An Indian Army HAL Cheetah (Aérospatiale SA 315B Lama) crashed or crash landed on a hilly in foggy weather conditions in Shiv Ghar Dhar area, Udhampur district. Both pilots died in the crash and the helicopter was destroyed.

26 September
A Philippine Navy AW109E Power rolled over and crashed while attempting to land at Cagayan North International Airport. Four occupants were injured.

=== October 2021 ===
5 October

A helicopter of the Tunisian Armed Forces crashed in Gabes Governorate, in Tunisia. Three crew members were killed in the accident.

13 October
A Royal Australian Navy MH-60R Seahawk operating from HMAS Brisbane made an emergency landing in the Philippine Sea. Its crew of three were rescued.

21 October
An Indian Air Force Mirage 2000 crashed in Bhind, Madhya Pradesh after a technical malfunction. The pilot ejected safely but was injured.

=== November 2021 ===
16 November
A Royal Malaysian Air Force Hawk 108 crashed at RMAF Butterworth Air Base in Penang. One pilot was killed and another one was injured.

17 November
A Royal Air Force F-35B Lightning II crashed during routine operations in the Mediterranean. The pilot was safely recovered to HMS Queen Elizabeth. An investigation was started.

30 November

Azerbaijani State Border Service Mi-17 20136 crashes north of the capital on 30 November with 18 officers on board, killing 14.

=== December 2021 ===
2 December
A Beechcraft 58 Baron of the Armed Forces of El Salvador crashed into the Pacific Ocean off the coast of La Paz Department, killing all three occupants on board. The son of the Minister of Defense of El Salvador, René Merino Monroy, was one of the victims of the accident.

3 December
Royal Thai Air Force F-5F Tiger II 21105, of Wing 21, crashes in Lopburi during training due to a bird strike. The pilot ejected safely but was injured.

8 December

Indian Air Force Mi-17V5 ZP5164 crashes in Coonoor, Tamil Nadu at 12:20 PM IST. The Chief of Defence Staff General Bipin Rawat and 13 others, including his wife were killed.

14 December
A Royal Thai Army Enstrom 480B crashed near Jiraprawat military camp in Nakhon Sawan Province during training flight. Two occupants died.

20 December
A Madagascar Air Force Eurocopter AS350 Écureuil crashed in the sea off Fenerive-Est, while conducting search and rescue flights in connection with the accident of a cargo vessel. There were four people on board the helicopter. The pilot plus one passenger drowned, while the mechanic and the country's secretary of state for police survived the crash. The latter was rescued after drifting in the sea throughout the night for some 12 hours, and was found and picked up by a small boat the next morning

24 December
An Indian Air Force MiG-21 Bison fighter jet crashes in a village in Jaisalmer, Rajasthan. The sole pilot on board died in the accident.

== 2022 ==
=== January 2022 ===
3 January
An Agusta-Bell AB 205 helicopter of the Tunisian Air Force crashes in the Bizerte Governorate in the early afternoon. One of the pilots died on the spot while the other one died in the hospital.

An Israeli Air Force Eurocopter AS565 Panther used by the Israeli Navy crashes at sea near the beach of Haifa. Both air force pilots were killed and the third crewman, a navy liaison officer was injured.
4 January
A Republic of Korea Air Force F-35A jet fighter made an emergency "belly landing" at an air base after its landing gear malfunctioned due to electronic issues. Pilot did not eject and walked away from the accident.
11 January
An F-16V fighter of the Republic of China Air Force crashes into the sea near Aogu Wetland, Dongshi, Chiayi County. The pilot died.
A Republic of Korea Air Force F-5E fighter crashed into a mountain near Hwaseong, some 40 kilometers south of Seoul. The pilot died.
An Aerostar R40S Festival light sports trainer of the Mozambique Air Force crashed into a dwelling, right after taking off from Maputo International Airport, killing the two pilots on board.
24 January
A USN F-35C crashed in South China Sea after a hard landing on USS Carl Vinson. The pilot managed to eject but sustained injuries along with six other sailors and there was superficial damage to the runway. On 2 March 2022, the aircraft was recovered from a depth of approximately 12,400 ft (3,780 m) with the aid of a remotely operated vehicle (ROV). A video of the aircraft crash was leaked, for which five sailors were charged accordingly.
31 January
A Mitsubishi F-15J of the Japan Air Self-Defense Force crashed into the sea shortly after taking off from Komatsu Air Base, killing the two pilots on board.

=== February 2022 ===
16 February
A Tatmadaw Lei Nanchang A-5 Fantan crashed into Yaymyatgyi Lake, Sagaing region, after a technical malfunction. The pilot died in the crash and the aircraft was destroyed.

17 February
A Syrian Air Force Mil Mi-14 crashed into a hillside in Al-Ruwaymiyah, Latakia Governorate after the tail rotor failed, killing two of the four crew.

21 February
An Islamic Republic of Iran Air Force F-5 jet crashed into a school in Tabriz, East Azerbaijan province, killing both pilots and a person on the ground.

24 February

An An-26 transport aircraft of the Russian Aerospace Forces crashed in the village of Uryv-Pokrovka in Voronezh, all 6 crew members died and the aircraft was destroyed.

=== March 2022 ===
1 March
A Shaanxi Y-8 of the People's Liberation Army Naval Air Force crashed in the sea south of Hainan Island killing at least 7 crew members.

2 March
A Romanian Air Force MiG-21 LanceR crashed in Cogealac, killing the sole pilot on board.
A Romanian Air Force IAR 330 crashed near Gura Dobrogei while searching for a missing MiG-21 LanceR, killing seven.

8 March
A Royal Thai Air Force General Dynamics F-16A Block 15P ADF, crashed in Chatturat, Chaiyaphum after a technical malfunction. The pilot ejected safely and the aircraft was destroyed.
10 March

An unidentified Soviet-made Tupolev Tu-141 reconnaissance unmanned aerial vehicle crashed in Zagreb, the capital of Croatia.

14 March
A ROC Air Force Dassault Mirage 2000 fighter jet crashed into the sea after a mechanical problem. The pilot survived after ejecting. This was the second crash of a fighter jet of the Taiwanese Air Force within three months after the crash of an F-16 on 11 January.

18 March
A U.S. Marine Corps MV-22B participating in military exercise Cold Response in Norway crashed in the Gråtådalen valley in Beiarn Municipality in Nordland county. The aircraft was carrying a crew of four at the time. They were all killed.

22 March
A Pakistan Air Force PAC MFI-395 Super Mushshak trainer aircraft crashed near Gara Tajik, Peshawar killing two pilots.

23 March
An F-16 From the Oklahoma Air National Guard crashed in Beauregard Parish, Louisiana after departing Ellington Field in Houston. The pilot ejected without injuries

29 March

Eight UN peacekeepers, six Pakistanis, a Russian and a Serb, part of the United Nations Stabilization Mission in the Democratic Republic of the Congo were killed in a crash of a Puma helicopter operated by the Pakistan Army Aviation Corps while on a reconnaissance mission in the troubled eastern Democratic Republic of Congo. Cause of the crash is yet to be ascertained.

=== April 2022 ===
1 April

Two KAI KT-1 Woongbi training aircraft collided mid-air and crashed into a mountain near Sacheon Air Base in South Korea. All 4 pilots ejected from the planes but were later found dead.

8 April
A Mikoyan MiG-31 of the Russian Air Force crashed under unknown circumstances in Leningrad region during a training flight. Both pilots ejected safely.

=== May 2022 ===
24 May

A Chengdu F-7 of the Islamic Republic of Iran Air Force crashed near Anarak, Isfahan province in Iran. The two pilots died in the accident.

=== June 2022 ===
3 June

A Boeing F/A-18 Super Hornet operated by VFA-113 "Stingers" crashed near Trona, San Bernardino County in California. The pilot died in the accident.

8 June

A U.S. Marine Corps MV-22B, of Marine Aircraft Group 39 of the 3rd Marine Aircraft Wing, crashes near Glamis, California, killing five.
9 June
A PLAAF Chengdu J-7 crashed in a residential area in Hubei, China, destroying several houses and killing at least one person on the ground. The pilot ejected with minor injuries.
18 June
A Hongdu K-8W jet trainer of the Venezuelan Air Force crashed in Los Cortijos, in San Francisco Municipality. Both pilots ejected safely from the aircraft.
24 June

A Russian Air Force, Ilyushin Il-76 RF-78778 crashed after catching fire shortly after departing Dyagilevo (air base), killing five of the nine crew.

=== July 2022 ===
15 July
A UH-60M Black Hawk of the Mexican Navy crashed near Los Mochis Airport, Sinaloa. The helicopter was carrying 15 occupants, 14 of them died and 1 survived. The aircraft had previously participated in the capture of Rafael Caro Quintero.
19 July
A KAI T-50 Golden Eagle jet trainer of the Indonesian Air Force crashed in Blora Regency, Central Java, killing the sole pilot on board.
28 July

An Indian Air Force MiG-21 jet crashed during a training sortie in Rajasthan's Barmer area. The two pilots – Wing Commander M. Rana and Flight Lieutenant Advitya Bal died in the incident.

=== August 2022 ===
1 August
A Pakistan Army Aviation Corps helicopter, which was on flood relief operations in Lasbela District, Balochistan, lost contact with Air Traffic Control. The six military personnel, including Commander XII Corps Lieutenant General Sarfraz Ali died in the crash. Reports from Pakistani authorities on their early investigations attributed the crash to poor weather conditions, with fog being the main culprit, due to which the Helicopter crashed into a mountain.

=== September 2022 ===
7 September
A Beechcraft Bonanza G-36 of the Indonesian Navy crashed and sunk into the Madura Strait, East Java. The two pilots on board the aircraft were killed in the accident. The plane crashed while carrying out an air defense exercise or anti-air attack exercise.
26 September
A Uganda Air Force Mil Mi-8 transporting 7 soldiers crashed in Ituri province, Democratic Republic of the Congo. 3 occupants and 22 people on the ground were killed.
29 September
A Russian Air Force Su-27 Flanker fighter jet fired two missiles at a Royal Air Force RC-135 Rivet Joint surveillance aircraft while it was flying in international airspace over the Black Sea. One of the two missiles missed, while the other failed to ignite and simply fell off the fighter jet. Russia claimed the incident was the result of a "technical malfunction". In September 2023, BBC News reported based on Western defense sources that communications intercepts had shown that the missiles were fired by the pilot intentionally, ostensibly due to a miscommunication between the fighter pilot and the Russian fighter control station on the ground.

=== October 2022 ===
1 October
A Mexican Navy Eurocopter EC 145 suffered a tail rotor failure and crashed near Centla, Tabasco. Three occupants died in the crash and two were injured.

5 October

At around 10am on 5 October, a Cheetah helicopter crashed near the town of Tawang in the Indian state of Arunachal Pradesh, near the Indian-Chinese border. Two pilots were aboard, one of them was killed while the other was injured and taken to the nearest Military Hospital.

17 October

On the evening of 17 October 2022. a Su-34 aircraft crashed into an apartment building in Yeysk, Krasnodar Krai. The pilots managed to eject before the crash. The crash caused an explosion that killed 15 people on the apartments.

19 October
An F-35A crashed at the North end of the runway at Hill Air Force Base in Utah. The pilot safely ejected and was unharmed. The cause of the crash was due to errors in the air data system from the wake turbulence of a preceding aircraft, which resulted in several rapid transitions between the primary and backup flight conditions data sources; these rapid transitions then caused the accumulation of reset values, resulting in the flight control laws operating on inaccurate flight conditions data and the departure from controlled flight.

23 October

A Su-30 fighter aircraft on a test flight crashed into an empty house in Irkutsk, Irkutsk Oblast. The two crew members died on impact.

=== December 2022 ===
2 December
A Mikoyan MiG-31 interceptor crashed in Primorsky Krai during a training flight. The two crew members ejected safely.

6 December

A MiG-21UM fighter jet of the Croatian Air Force crashed near Slatina in Croatia. The two pilots ejected from the plane and landed safely.

13 December

An Eurofighter Typhoon fighter jet of the Italian Air Force crashed near Locogrande, north of Marsala in Sicily. The sole pilot on board died in the accident.

15 December
An US Navy F-35B crashed during a failed vertical landing at Naval Air Station Joint Reserve Base Fort Worth in Texas. The pilot ejected on the ground and was not seriously injured. The aircraft was undergoing production test flying by a government pilot and had not yet been delivered by the manufacturer to the US military.

== 2023 ==
=== January 2023 ===
23 January
An Algerian Air Force Mil Mi-17 crashed in El Attaf District, Aïn Defla. All three crew members died in the crash.

25 January
A Philippine Air Force SIAI-Marchetti SF.260TP crashed in a rice field near Sitio Tabon, Pilar, Bataan. Both pilots died and the aircraft was destroyed.

27 January
A Hongdu K-8VB of the Bolivian Air Force crashed near Cobija, Pando Department. Both pilots ejected safely from the aircraft.

28 January
Two Indian Air Force fighter jets, a Sukhoi Su-30MKI and a Dassault Mirage 2000H, crashed while engaged in a combat simulation mission over Morena, Madhya Pradesh. The pilot of the Mirage 2000H suffered fatal injuries while both of the pilots of the Sukhoi Su-30MKI ejected safely.

30 January
A Hellenic Air Force upgraded two-seated F-4E Phantom ΙΙ crashed in the Ionian sea at around 10:30 am, 25 nautical miles (46,3 Km) south of Andravida air base. The accident occurred during a training exercise with another F-4E that returned to base. Both pilots were killed. It is still unclear what caused the crash but some speculate that it is due to a technical failure.

31 January
A Sukhoi Su-22M4 of the Vietnam People's Air Force suffered issues during a regular training flight and crashed during a landing attempt at Yên Bái Air Base, Vietnam. The sole pilot on board suffered fatal injuries.

=== February 2023 ===
8 February
A Pakistani Air Force PAC MFI-395 Super Mushshak crashed in Mardan and was destroyed. Both pilots survived.

15 February
A Sikorsky UH-60 Black Hawk helicopter belonging to the Tennessee Military Department crashed on Highway 53 near Harvest, Alabama, killing both crew members.

23 February
A Russian Sukhoi Su-25 crashed near Valyuki, Belgorod Oblast, the sole pilot on board died. The preliminary cause of the crash is a technical malfunction.

25 February
A Hongdu K-8E of the Egyptian Air Force crashed in an undisclosed location in Egypt during a training flight. The pilot ejected safely from the aircraft.

=== March 2023 ===
7 March
Two Italian Air Force SIAI-Marchetti S.208M trainer aircraft collided in mid-air in Guidonia near Rome, both pilots died.

14 March

An American MQ-9 Reaper drone was intercepted and damaged by a Russian Su-27 fighter jet, while performing a reconnaissance mission over the Black Sea.

16 March
An Indian Army HAL Cheetah helicopter crashed near Mandala, West Kameng District, Arunachal Pradesh. The two pilots died in the crash.

19 March
A Bell UH-1N of the Colombian Army crashed after suffering an apparent inflight loss of control and impact with terrain in Chocó, Colombia. The four crew members died.

29 March

Two U.S. Army Sikorsky UH-60 Black Hawk helicopters collide during a training mission over Trigg County, Kentucky, killing all 9 people on board.

=== April 2023 ===
6 April

A JGSDF UH-60JA helicopter carrying the commander of the 8th Division crashed off the coast of Miyako-jima while on a surveillance mission. All 10 passengers and crew were killed.

20 April

A Russian Su-34 bomber accidentally dropped a bomb on a street in Belgorod city (a city near the Russo-Ukrainian border). Three people were injured and several buildings were damaged.

22 April
A Mali Air Force Mil-Mi 24D helicopter crashed in a residential area in Bamako. 3 crew members died and 6 people on the ground were injured

24 April
A Philippine Air Force SIAI-Marchetti SF.260FH crashed shortly after takeoff at Basilio Fernando Air Base in Lipa, Batangas. Two pilots were injured.

26 April
A Russian Mikoyan MiG-31 crashed and caught fire mid-flight during a training mission and crashed into a lake near the village of Rizh-Guba, Murmansk Oblast. Both crew members ejected.

27 April

Two U.S. Army AH-64 Apache helicopters collide in Alaska, killing 3 people and injuring one in returning to Fort Wainwright in Fairbanks. The incident involved training exercises.

28 April
A Turkish C130 Hercules plane was shot at as it was landing at Wadi Seidna airfield in Sudan. The plane was going to help with evacuation of Turkish citizens during the Sudan conflict. No one was hurt in the incident, the plane sustained some damage.

29 April
A PAC CT/4 Airtrainer plane of the Royal Thai Air Force crashed during a landing attempt at Kamphaeng Saen Air Base, Nakhon Pathom province. The flight instructor died while the student was seriously injured.

=== May 2023 ===
4 May
A HAL Dhruv helicopter of the Indian Army crashed on the banks of the Marua River, Kishtwar district, Jammu and Kashmir. The three crew members initially survived the crash, but one of the occupants succumbed to his injuries after being taken to a hospital.

6 May
While participating in a routine training flight, a US F-16 fighter jet crashed near the Osan Air Base in South Korea. The pilot was able to safely eject from the aircraft before the crash.

8 May
A MiG-21 of the Indian Air Force crashed into a home in Hanumangarh, Rajasthan. The pilot was able to eject from the aircraft before it crashed, while 3 people on the ground died after the crash.

13 May

Two Mi-8 helicopters, a Su-34 fighter-bomber and a Su-35 fighter, all belonging to the Russian Air Force, crashed, all 9 people in the group of aircraft died.

12 May
A Russian Mil Mi-28 crashed in the Dzhankoi district of Crimea during a training flight killing both pilots. The Russian Defense Ministry suspects equipment failure as the cause of the crash.

15 May
A Finnish Air Force BAe Hawk Mk 51 trainer jet crashed near Heinäsentie 352, south of Keuruu. Both pilots ejected safely while the aircraft was destroyed.

20 May
An EF-18 of the Spanish Air and Space Force that was carrying out acrobatic manoeuvers crashed at the Zaragoza Air Base in Spain. The pilot ejected but suffered leg injuries.

28 May
A Bell 412EP helicopter of the Indonesian Army crashed due to down draft and burnt in Patenggang Village, Rancabali District, Bandung Regency, West Java. Five occupants were injured.

31 May
A US Navy Northrop F-5N, belonging to a reserve adversary squadron, crashed into the sea 25 miles off Key West, Florida. The pilot ejected safely and was rescued by a US Navy Helicopter.

=== June 2023 ===
1 June
An Indian Air Force HAL HJT-16 Kiran trainer jet crashed near Chamarajanagar district, Karnataka after an apparent technical malfunction. Both pilots ejected safely but the aircraft was destroyed.

7 June

A helicopter of the Tunisian Armed Forces crashed in the Mediterranean Sea near Bizerte. All four crew members were killed in the crash.

13 June
On 13 June 2023, a MH-47 Chinook helicopter was involved in an accident in northeastern Syria resulted in injuries to 22 U.S. soldiers. The military referred to the incident as a "mishap" and reported that there was no enemy fire involved. The Pentagon said that the accident was caused by a mechanical failure while landing. The soldiers suffered injuries of varying degrees and ten were transported to hospitals outside the region for treatment.

15 June
A Eurocopter EC 120B Colibri of the Myanmar Air Force crashed during a training flight in Lewe Township, Nay Pyi Taw Union Territory. both pilots died in the accident.

16 June
A Mil Mi-17 of the Mexican Air Force crashed during a training mission in Temamatla, Mexico. The helicopter burst into flames and was destroyed, two occupants died and the two other were wounded.

19 June
A Royal Jordanian Air Force Bell AH-1F Cobra helicopter was destroyed in an accident in Al-Baqa'a near Abu Nseir, Jordan. One of the pilots died and the other was injured.

20 June
A Royal Canadian Air Force CH-147F, carrying four crew members, crashed during a training flight into the Ottawa River. Two crew members died and the other two survived with minor injuries.

21 June
An Airbus H145 helicopter of the Hungarian Air Force crashed in the Cikola River canyon in Croatia during a training mission. All 3 crew members died.

29 June
A Royal Danish Air Force SAAB MFI-17 (T-17) Supporter clipped some powerlines and crashed during a training flight in a cornfield field near Herrup, between Viborg and Holstebro. Both occupants were injured and the aircraft was written off.

=== July 2023 ===
1 July
Two Colombian Air Force Embraer EMB 314 Super Tucano entered in a mid-air collision while they were practicing maneuvers with other aircraft at around 5:28 pm near Apiay Air Base in Villavicencio, Meta. They were preparing for the Aviation Fair of Colombia taking place on 12 July, as well as for the Independence Day of Colombia on 20 July. Both pilots managed to eject, one died and the other one only suffered minor injuries.

2 July
A Venezuelan Air Force Sukhoi Su-30MKK, registration 3363, crashed in Guaicaipuro, Miranda at 9:45 am due to the loss of control generated after a failure and subsequent right engine fire caused by a bird strike. It was preparing for a commemorative parade taking place on 5 July in Venezuela. Both pilots managed to eject, one died due to a possible asphyxiation caused by the parachute cables.

4 July
A Russian Naval Aviation Mikoyan MiG-31 crashed into the Avacha Bay, Kamchatka Krai. Both crew members died.

17 July
A Russian Air Force Sukhoi Su-25 crashed into the Sea of Azov off the coast of Yeysk, Krasnodar Krai. The preliminary cause of the crash was given as engine failure, the pilot did not survive.

25 July
A Canadian Air force CC-150 plane collides with a French Air Force A400M plane on the runway of Andersen Air Force Base in Guam. There are no deaths or injuries, both planes were damaged.

26 July
A Royal Saudi Air Force F-15SA crashed during a training mission in Khamis Mushait at King Khalid Air Base; the crew died

28 July
An Australian Army MRH90 helicopter crashed in Queensland, Australia, off Hamilton Island during Exercise Talisman Sabre. The four personnel on board were killed.

31 July
A Bell 412EP of the Chilean Air Force crashed during a night flight in Osorno Province, Los Lagos region. The 5 occupants died in the crash.

=== August 2023 ===
7 August
A PT-6 trainer aircraft of the Sri Lanka Air Force crashed after taking off from China Bay Airport. The two officers on board died in the crash

8 August
A Eurocopter EC725 helicopter of the Brazilian Navy crashed in the region of Formosa, Goiás, two crew members died and 12 others were injured. The helicopter was destroyed.

9 August
A Lockheed CC-130 Hercules of the Royal Canadian Air Force suffered mild damage while parked at CFB Comox when its empennage was hit by the wing of a taxiing Boeing 737-700 operated by WestJet. The Lockheed CC-130 Hercules sustained serious damage while the 737's winglet fell off as a result of the collision.

12 August
A Russian Sukhoi Su-30 crashed in a deserted area of Kaliningrad Oblast during a tranining mission. Both pilots died. Authorities blamed a technical malfunction as the cause of the crash.

14 August
A Russian Aero L-39 Albatros crashed while landing on an airfield in Krasnodar Krai killing the pilot.

24 August
A U.S. Marine Corps F/A-18 Hornet on a training flight crashed north of San Diego, California, at 23:54 local time. The pilot died after ejecting from the aircraft

25 August
Two Aero L-39 Albatros training aircraft of the Ukrainian Air Force had a mid-air collision over the Zhytomyr region of Ukraine on 25 August. The air force said three pilots were killed, including one with the call-sign "Juice", who had given many interviews to western media.

27 August
A United States Marine Corps MV-22B Osprey crashed on Melville Island, Northern Territory, Australia, during a training exercise. The aircraft was carrying 23 service members. Three crew members died and the rest were injured.

=== September 2023 ===
4 September
A Westland WS-61 Sea King of the Pakistan Navy crashed in PNS Akram near Gwadar, Balochistan. The three crew members died in the accident.

10 September
An AgustaWestland AW139 of the National Aeronaval Service of Panama, crashed near Olá, Coclé Province. The three servicemembers aboard the helicopter died in the accident.

16 September

An Aermacchi MB-339 of the Italian Air Force's Frecce Tricolori aerobatic demonstration team crashed near Caselle Airport, Turin, Italy. The pilot ejected from the aircraft and survived. A 5-year-old girl was killed on the ground, and three others were injured.

17 September
A Lockheed Martin F-35 Lightning II of the U.S. Marine Corps' Marine Fighter Attack Training Squadron 501 (VMFAT-501) was lost over South Carolina after the pilot ejected from the aircraft near North Charleston. Initial efforts to search for the aircraft were focused on Lake Moultrie and Lake Marion, with both the military and the South Carolina Law Enforcement Division participating in the search. The military also called on the public to provide information on the location of the missing jet. Debris from the jet was later found in a field in Williamsburg County, close to Joint Base Charleston.

19 September
A Kenya Air Force Bell UH-1 crashed in Lamu County, Kenya, close to the border with Somalia. The 8 occupants of the helicopter died in the crash.

23 September

An Ilyushin Il-76 strategic airlifter overran the runway at Gao International Airport, Mali, and was subsequently engulfed in flames. It was initially unclear by whom the aircraft was operated. The airport was closed after the accident, and at least one flight was diverted.

=== October 2023 ===
5 October

A U.S. Air Force F-16 Fighting Falcon shot down a Turkish unmanned combat aerial vehicle over northeastern Syria. According to the U.S. military, the drone had attacked targets in close proximity to American forces on the ground and had not left the area despite multiple warnings.

12 October
A Bell 412 helicopter of the Mexican Air Force crashed near the town of El Ventoso in the state of Durango. Three servicemembers died in the accident.

19 October
An Agusta-Bell 212 helicopter of the Austrian Air Force crashed in a field near Pramet, Ried im Innkreis. The helicopter caught fire and was destroyed. One crew member was seriously injured

20 October
A Russian Air Force Il-76 transport aircraft suffered a runway excursion during takeoff from Hisar Air Base near Dushanbe. A fire erupted after the aircraft veered off the runway, the fire destroyed the plane. No tripulants were injured

=== November 2023 ===
10 November
A U.S. Army MH-60 Black Hawk helicopter crashed into the Mediterranean Sea off the coast of Cyprus during a training flight, killing all 5 U.S. service personnel aboard. The dead were members of the U.S. Army's 160th Special Operations Aviation Regiment. According to U.S. European Command, the helicopter was involved in "a routine air refueling mission".

11 November
A Hongdu K-8W of the Myanmar Air Force crashed in Hpruso Township, Karenni State. Both pilots ejected safely. The insurgent group KNDF claimed to have shot down the plane while the military junta claimed it crashed due to a technical failure.

16 November
Two Indonesian Air Force Embraer EMB-314E Super Tucano (A-29) aircraft, operated by 21st Air Squadron, crashed under unknown circumstances on the slopes of Mount Bromo, near Keduwung Village, Puspo District, Pasuruan, East Java. The aircraft (TT-3103 and TT-3111) were part of a four-ship formation that had departed Malang-Abdul Rachman Saleh Air Base. At the time of the accident they were flying in a box formation. 4 pilots died in the crash.

17 November
A Mil Mi-8 of the Uzbekistan Air and Air Defence Forces crashed in the Kattakurgan training ground. The entire crew died in the accident, the number of fatalities was not disclosed.

20 November

A U.S. Navy Boeing P-8 Poseidon maritime patrol aircraft, assigned to Patrol Squadron 4 (VP-4), overran a runway at Marine Corps Air Station Kaneohe Bay, Oahu, Hawaii, while landing and ended up in the shallow water of Kaneohe Bay. All nine people aboard the aircraft made it to shore and were uninjured according to the military.

28 November
A U.S. Air Force Bell Boeing CV-22 Osprey tiltrotor aircraft, carrying eight airmen, crashed off the coast of Yakushima, Japan, killing one crew member and leaving seven missing as of 30 November 2023. In the aftermath of the crash, the Japanese government asked the U.S. to ground its V-22 Osprey fleet in Japan, except in the case of emergency flights. Air Force investigators identified a cracked pinion gear in the proprotor gearbox and the pilot's decision to continue the flight as causes for the crash.

=== December 2023 ===
4 December
A Pilatus PC-7 of the Indian Air Force crashed in Medak, Telangana. Both pilots died in the accident and the airplane was destroyed by fire.

6 December

A Bell 412 utility helicopter of the Guyana Defense Force crashed in Guyana, killing five of the seven military personnel on board.

7 December
A McDonnell Douglas F-15SA strike fighter of the Royal Saudi Air Force crashed at King Abdulaziz Air Base in Dhahran, killing the 2 crew members on board.

11 December
An F-16 Fighting Falcon fighter jet assigned to the U.S. Air Force's 8th Fighter Wing crashed into the Yellow Sea off the Western coast of South Korea after experiencing an in-flight emergency. The pilot ejected from the aircraft prior to the crash and was rescued from the water through efforts by the Republic of Korea Navy and Korea Coast Guard. The pilot was then airlifted to Kunsan Air Base by a Republic of Korea Air Force helicopter. Colonel Matthew Gaetke, commander of the 8th Fighter Wing, said that "the pilot is in good condition".

16 December
An Islamic Revolutionary Guard Corps Aerospace Force Sukhoi Su-22 fighter jet crashed near Lake Parishan in Kazerun County, Fars province, Iran. According to Iranian state-run media, the pilot ejected from the aircraft before the crash.

27 December
A North American T-2 Buckeye aircraft of the Hellenic Air Force crashed shortly after taking off from Kalamata Air Base, killing the sole pilot.

== 2024 ==
=== January 2024 ===
2 January
A Mil Mi-28 attack helicopter operated by the Uganda People's Defence Force crashed into a house in Ntoroko District, Uganda, killing both pilots as well as a civilian on the ground. According to a military spokesperson, the helicopter was en route to Congo to participate in the Ugandan military's ongoing operations related to the Allied Democratic Forces insurgency.

4 January
A Rockwell B-1B Lancer bomber operated by the United States Air Force crashed while landing at Ellsworth Air Force Base, South Dakota. According to the 28th Bomb Wing, all four aircrew safely ejected from the plane.

5 January
A Mil Mi-17 transport helicopter operated by the Niger Air Force crash landed in Kantchari, Burkina Faso, after experiencing technical difficulties. One person aboard was injured in the incident.

9 January
A Sukhoi Su-22M4 fighter-bomber operated by the Vietnamese Air Force crashed in Điện Bàn, Quảng Nam province, Vietnam, during a routine training flight. The pilot ejected from the aircraft before the crash. One individual on the ground sustained minor injuries from flying debris as a result of the crash.

10 January
A helicopter operating on behalf of the United Nations Assistance Mission in Somalia "crash lands" in hostile territory. The incident left one presumed dead and led to the apparent capture of six of the nine people on board, with another two having fled. At least some of the captured are in the hands of the militant group al-Shabaab according to Somali military officials. Aboard the aircraft were four Ukrainians, two Kenyans, an Egyptian, a Somali, and a Ugandan. An internal UN memo reported by The Washington Post suggests that the helicopter's main rotor "was struck by an object", leading to the crash landing. The "object" was not identified.

10 January
An AgustaWestland HH-101 of the Italian Air Force's 9th Wing (9° Stormo) hit a high voltage overhead power line in the Latina province of Central Italy and made an emergency landing.

11 January
A Sikorsky MH-60R Seahawk helicopter operated by the United States Navy's Helicopter Maritime Strike Squadron 41 (HSM-41) crashed into San Diego Bay, California. All six crew members survived.

12 January
A Mil Mi-17 transport helicopter operated by the Sri Lanka Air Force (SLAF) as part of the MINUSCA UN peacekeeping forces crashed during a landing in the Central African Republic. An SLAF spokesperson attributed the crash to bad weather, also saying that none of the five people aboard the aircraft were in critical condition.

12 January
A Eurocopter UH-12 utility helicopter operated by the Brazilian Navy's 1st Northwestern General Purpose Helicopter Squadron (HU-91) crashed at Manaus Air Force Base, Brazil, during a training flight. The crew were taken to a hospital and were found to be in good health.

17 January
A Mil Mi-8 transport helicopter operated by the Kyrgyz Air Force crashed at Frunze-1 Air Base near the northwestern outskirts of Bishkek, Kyrgyzstan, killing a pilot and injuring seven others. According to the Kyrgyz Ministry of Defense, the helicopter was conducting a training flight.

17 January
An FMA IA-63 Pampa jet trainer operated by the Argentine Air Force's Flight Test Center (Spanish: Centro de Ensayos en Vuelo) made an emergency landing in Córdoba, Argentina, after being unable to extend its nose gear. The pilot was not injured, though the aircraft's nose was damaged in the landing.

23 January
A Shaanxi Y-8 military transport aircraft operated by the Myanmar Air Force overran the runway at Lengpui Airport, Aizawl, India, injuring twelve aboard, four of them seriously. The aircraft sustained substantial damage. The aircraft had traveled to India in order to retrieve 92 soldiers who had fled there as a result of fighting as part of the Myanmar civil war.

24 January

An Ilyushin Il-76 of the Russian Air Force crashed in Korochansky District, Belgorod Oblast, killing everyone on board. The Russian government claimed the plane was shot down by the Ukrainian Armed Forces while it was carrying 65 Ukrainian prisoners of war, as well as 6 crew members and 3 guards. One Ukrainian newspaper reported that, according to their sources in the General Staff of the Armed Forces of Ukraine, the aircraft was a legitimate military target and that it was carrying S-300 missiles for bombing Kharkiv Oblast. There has been no independent verification of the claims of either of the two countries.
25 January
A Turkish Air Force Transall C-160 military transport aircraft, modified for electronic intelligence gathering, made an emergency landing at Kayseri Airport, Kayseri, Turkey, after experiencing a technical defect during a training flight. According to the Turkish military, the aircraft sustained only minor damage in the landing, though German aviation magazine Flug Revue, citing images of the crashed aircraft shared on social media, says the damage is more substantial and may result in the aircraft being written off. The crew aboard the aircraft is reported to be in healthy condition.

30 January
A Bell TH-57 Sea Ranger trainer helicopter operated by the United States Navy crashed at Naval Air Station Whiting Field, Florida, injuring the two pilots aboard the aircraft.

31 January
A United States Air Force F-16 Fighting Falcon fighter jet crashed into the sea off South Korea's west coast after experiencing an in-flight emergency. The pilot ejected safely from the plane and was rescued an hour later. The crashed plane was assigned to the 8th Fighter Wing.

=== February 2024 ===
3 February
A corporal of the Indian Air Force was killed while conducting repairs on a HAL HJT-16 Kiran trainer aircraft at Hakimpet Air Force Station, Hyderabad, India. According to police, the aircraft's ejection seat unexpectedly fired, causing a fatal head injury.

5 February
A Sikorsky UH-60 Black Hawk transport helicopter of the Colombian Army crashed in Unguía, Chocó, Colombia, killing four and injuring three of the seven personnel aboard the helicopter.

6 February
A Sikorsky CH-53E Super Stallion heavy-lift helicopter, operated by Marine Heavy Helicopter Squadron 361 (HMH-361) of the United States Marine Corps, went missing on a flight from Creech Air Force Base, Nevada, to Marine Corps Air Station Miramar, California. On 7 February, the aircraft was located, having crashed near Pine Valley, California. All five Marines aboard the helicopter were killed in the accident.

7 February
A Mil Mi-171 transport helicopter of the Algerian Air Force crashed around 21:00 local time near El Golea Airport, El Menia, Algeria, killing three crew members.

11 February
A Grob G 120TP trainer aircraft operated by the Royal Jordanian Air Force crashes at King Hussein Air Base, Mafraq, Jordan, causing fatal injuries to the aircraft's two pilots.

12 February
A Boeing AH-64D Apache attack helicopter operated by the Utah Army National Guard crashed at South Valley Regional Airport, West Jordan, Utah, resulting in injuries to the two pilots, a National Guard instructor pilot and an Air Force pilot, as well as extensive damage to the aircraft. The accident occurred as part of a familiarization flight according to reporting by KSL-TV. The cause of the crash is under investigation.

13 February
A BAE Hawk jet trainer aircraft of the Indian Air Force crashed near Kalaikunda Air Force Station, Kharagpur, West Bengal, India. Both pilots safely ejected from the aircraft prior to the crash.

23 February
A Boeing AH-64 Apache attack helicopter operated by the Mississippi National Guard crashed near Baldwyn, Prentiss County, Mississippi. Two crew members died in the incident.

A Eurocopter UH-72 Lakota helicopter operated by the U.S. Army crashed in Pike County, Alabama. The two person crew survived with minor injuries.

29 February
A Mikoyan MiG-29 of the Myanmar Air Force crashed in Magway Region, Myanmar. A report from state television channel MRTV claimed the two pilots ejected from the aircraft. The same report also blamed a technical malfunction as the cause of the accident.

A Northrop F-5 operated by U.S. defense contractor Tactical Air Support made a gear-up landing at Hill Air Force Base, Utah.

=== March 2024 ===
5 March
An ultralight aircraft of the Indian Army crashed in Gaya district, Bihar, India, resulting in minor injuries to the two pilots aboard the aircraft.

A Bell UH-1H Iroquois of the Turkish Air Force crashed in Bademler, Urla, İzmir Province, Turkey, due to a technical issue. One of the three personnel aboard the aircraft was injured in the accident.

6 March
A Eurocopter AS565 Panther of the Mexican Navy crashed in the sea off the coast of Lázaro Cárdenas, Michoacán. Three soldiers died, three were rescued and two were declared missing.

8 March
A Eurocopter UH-72 Lakota helicopter of the Texas Army National Guard crashed near La Grulla, Starr County, Texas. Two soldiers and one U.S. Border Patrol agent were killed in the accident, with one additional soldier being injured.

11 March
A Sikorsky UH-60 Black Hawk operated by the Israel Defense Forces (IDF) was damaged and three IDF officers were lightly injured in a ground collision at Nevatim Airbase near Beersheba, Israel.

12 March
An HAL Tejas fighter jet operated by the Indian Air Force crashed near Jaisalmer, Rajasthan, India. The pilot ejected from the aircraft prior to the crash.

An Ilyushin Il-76 transport aircraft operated by the Russian Air Force crashed in Russia's Ivanovo Oblast, some 200 kilometres (120 mi) east of Moscow. According to the Russian Ministry of Defence, the aircraft was carrying eight crew and seven passengers.

14 March
A Canadair NF-5A jet, operated by the Turkish Stars display team of the Turkish Air Force, crashed into a construction site near the runway at Konya Airport. The pilot ejected from the aircraft before it crashed. One construction worker on the ground died in the accident.

19 March
An Antonov An-26 of the South Sudan Air Force crashed during landing at the Yida airstrip,Ruweng Administrative Area, South Sudan. The aircraft was carrying 7 occupants, three of them were injured in the incident. A fire engulfed and destroyed the plane after the accident.

20 March
A General Dynamics F-16 operated by the Hellenic Air Force crashed into the sea, close to the island of Psathoura in the northern Aegean Sea. The pilot ejected from the aircraft and was later rescued.

28 March
A Russian Sukhoi Su-35 jet crashed into the sea off the coast of Sevastopol in Crimea. The pilot ejected safely and was picked up by rescuers.

=== April 2024 ===
10 April
A Russian Mil Mi-24 attack helicopter crashed into the Black Sea off the coast of Crimea. The Russian Ministry of Defense blamed equipment failure as the preliminary cause.

11 April
A Robinson R22 helicopter of the Philippine Navy crashed in Cavite City, Cavite Province. The two pilots were initially injured in the crash but later died of their injuries.

A Mil Mi-17 helicopter of the Cuban Revolutionary Armed Forces crashed in the Santiago de Cuba International Airport, killing 3 crew members.

A Dassault Mirage 2000 fighter jet of the Peruvian Air Force crashed into the Pichu Pichu volcano in Arequipa, Peru, killing the sole pilot on board.

18 April
A Bell UH-1 Iroquois helicopter of the Kenyan Air Force crashed in Elgeyo Marakwet County in Kenya. Killing 10 officers and leaving 2 survivors. Among the victims was Chief of Defence Forces Francis Omondi Ogolla.

19 April
A Tupolev Tu-22M3 bomber crashed in Krasnogvardeysky District, Stavropol Krai. The aircraft was carrying 4 tripulants when it crashed. Two of them were rescued, while one died and the other was reported as missing. The Ukrainian Military claimed the bomber was downed by their anti-aircraft missile units, while the Russian Ministry of Defense claimed it crashed because of a technical malfunction.

20 April
Two Mitsubishi SH-60K of the Japan Maritime Self Defense Force crashed near Tori-shima Island in the Pacific Ocean, with 8 crew members on board. After an initial search only found one body, the other seven occupants were presumed to have died.

23 April

Two helicopters of the Royal Malaysian Navy, An AgustaWestland AW139 and a Eurocopter Fennec, collided over the town of Lumut in Perak state. Ten soldiers died in the accident, seven in the AW139 and 3 in the Fennec respectively.

26 April
A Mil Mi-17 of the Ecuadorian Army crashed in Pastaza Province, in Ecuador, while performing humanitarian work in the region. Five soldiers and three government employees died in this accident.

29 April
A Mil Mi-17 helicopter of the National Army of Colombia crashed in Santa Rosa del Sur, Bolivar Department in Colombia. Nine soldiers died in the accident.

30 April
A US Air Force General Dyamics F-16 crashed outside Holloman Air Force Base, located near Alamogordo in New Mexico. The pilot ejected safely before impact.

=== May 2024 ===
6 May
A Bell-430 helicopter of the Ecuadorian Navy crashed in Santa Elena Province. Two pilots were killed.

8 May
A Lockheed Martin F-16C Block 52 of the Republic of Singapore Air Force crashed within Tengah Airbase after experiencing issues during take off. The pilot ejected safely from the aircraft.

9 May
A Yakovlev Yak-130 training aircraft of the Bangladesh Air Force crashed in Chattogram. CCTV video shows the aircraft performing three aileron rolls while rapidly descending before impacting the runway right-side up and without landing gear. The aircraft then caught fire and bounced upwards, taking off again. Both crew members ejected and were rescued by Air Force and Navy personnel, with the assistance of nearby fishermen. The pilot died in hospital while the co-pilot sustained serious injuries. Bangladeshi officials have attributed the crash to a possible mechanical failure.

13 May
A Beechcraft T-6 US Air Force pilot died after the ejection seat of the plane was accidentally activated while on the ground. The incident occurred in Sheppard Air Force Base, Wichita County, Texas.

15 May
An Afghan Mil Mi-17 helicopter crashed in Ghor Province. One occupant died in the accident and twelve others were injured.

A SIAI-Marchetti SF.260 trainer aircraft of the Mauritania Islamic Air Force crashed in Atar International Airport. The two occupants were killed in the accident.

19 May

An Iranian Air Force Bell 212 helicopter crashed in Bakrabad Rural District near Varzaqan killing all on board. The aircraft was carrying 8 people including Iran's President Ebrahim Raisi and the Minister of Foreign Affairs Hossein Amir-Abdollahian.

25 May
A Supermarine Spitfire operated by the Royal Air Force crashed near RAF Coningsby in Lincolnshire, England, killing the sole pilot on board. The plane was part of the Battle of Britain Memorial Flight collection which is based on RAF Conningsby.

28 May
A Lockheed Martin F-35B, operated by a USAF pilot assigned to the Defense Contract Management Agency, crashed near Kirtland Air Force Base in Albuquerque, New Mexico. The pilot was hospitalized with serious injuries after ejecting from the aircraft.

=== June 2024 ===
4 June
A SIAI Marchetti SF.260D trainer aircraft of the Turkish Air Force crashed in Kayseri Province, Turkey, killing its two pilots.

A Sukhoi Su-30MKI fighter jet of the Indian Air Force crashed in Nashik District, Maharashtra. Both pilots ejected safely while the aircraft was destroyed on impact.

10 June

A Dornier 228 of the Malawian Defence Force carrying the vice president of the country, Saulos Chilima, and 8 other people disappeared over Chikangawa Forest Reserve. After 1 day of searching the wreckage of the plane was found within the Chikangawa Forest Reserve and all 9 people on board were confirmed dead.

11 June
A Sukhoi Su-34 of the Russian Aerospace Forces crashed in North Ossetia–Alania, killing the two crew members.

21 June
A helicopter of the Tunisian Armed Forces crashed in Gafsa Governorate. One crew member died and another was wounded.

=== July 2024 ===
2 July
A Sukhoi Su-25 of the Georgian Air Force crashed near Bolnisi, killing the sole pilot on board.

12 July
An Alenia Aermacchi M-346 jet trainer of the Polish Air Force crashed in Gdynia-Kosakowo Airport, killing the sole pilot on board.

A Harbin Z-9 helicopter of the Royal Cambodian Air Force crashed in the Cardamom Mountains, in Pursat Province. The helicopter had gone missing for two weeks until it was found on 29 July, alongside the bodies of the two crew members.

15 July
An A-4AR Fightinghawk attack aircraft of the Argentine Air Force crashed in Villa Reynolds Airport, San Luis Province, killing the sole pilot on board.

19 July
A Yakovlev Yak-52 trainer aircraft of the Armenian Air Force crashed 20 kilometers north of Yerevan, killing the 2 crew members on board.

24 July
A Eurofighter Typhoon fighter jet of the Italian Air Force crashed in Douglas Daly, Northern Territory, Australia. The pilot ejected safely from the aircraft. The plane was participating in Exercise Pitch Black when the accident occurred.

25 July
A Mil Mi-28 attack helicopter of the Russian Air Force crashed in Zhizdrinsky District, Kaluga Oblast. The two crew members died in the accident.

27 July
A Sukhoi Su-34 fighter jet of the Russian Air Force crashed in Serafimovichsky District, Volgograd Oblast. The two crew members ejected from the aircraft.

=== August 2024 ===
2 August
A Eurocopter AS365 Dauphin helicopter of the Myanmar Air Force crashed in Hmawbi Township, Myanmar. Major General Soe Tin Latt and another occupant died while the other two occupants were injured.

7 August
A Boeing AH-64 Apache attack helicopter of the US Army crashed in Fort Novosel, Alabama. One crew member was killed and another was injured.

14 August
Two French Air Force Dassault Rafale fighter jets collided mid-air and crashed near the town of Colombey-les-Belles, in Meurthe-et-Moselle department. One pilot ejected safely from his aircraft while the other two died in the accident.

15 August
A Tupolev Tu-22M3 strategic bomber of the Russian Air Force crashed in Irkutsk Oblast. The 4 crew members ejected from the aircraft, however one of them died and the other 3 were hospitalised with injuries.

26 August
A General Dynamic F-16 fighter jet of the Ukrainian Air Force crashed in an undisclosed location in Ukraine. The pilot of the aircraft, Oleksii Mes, died in the accident.

28 August
A Bell UH-1 Iroquois helicopter of the Armed Forces of Bosnia and Herzegovina crashed into Jablaničko lake after hitting a power line. One of the 4 occupants on board was injured.

=== September 2024 ===
2 September
A Mikoyan MiG-29 fighter jet of the Indian Air Force crashed in Barmer district, Rajasthan, the pilot ejected safely from the aircraft.

4 September
An AgustaWestland AW101 Merlin Mk4 helicopter of the Royal Navy ditched in the English Channel killing 1 crew member. The two other crew members were rescued and taken to a hospital.

8 September

A Bell UH-1 Iroquois helicopter of the Salvadoran Air Force crashed in Pasaquina, La Unión Department, in El Salvador. All 9 occupants of the aircraft died in the accident. Among the victims was the Director of the National Civil Police of El Salvador Mauricio Arriaza Chicas.

10 September
A Dassault Mirage 2000 fighter jet of the Republic of China Air Force crashed off the coast of Hsinchu, Taiwan. The pilot ejected safely from the aircraft and was rescued.

11 September
A Sikorsky UH-60 Black Hawk helicopter of the Israel Defense Forces crashed while attempting to land in the Philadelphi Corridor, Rafah Governorate. Two of the occupants were killed and the other seven were injured.

13 September
An Aero Vodochody L-39Z Albatros jet trainer of the Bulgarian Air Force crashed near Graf Ignatievo Air Base, in Bulgaria, killing the 2 pilots on board.

15 September
A Eurocopter EC225 Super Puma helicopter of the Air Force of Zimbawe crashed in Masvingo Airport, Masvingo Province. None of the occupants died but the aircraft was destroyed by the crash.

29 September
A Bell UH-1 Iroquois helicopter of the Colombian Aerospace Force crashed near Cumaribo, Vichada Department, Colombia, killing all 8 people on board.

=== October 2024 ===
3 October
A Yakovlev Yak-130 of the Lao People's Liberation Army Air Force crashed into a pond in Xiangkhouang province, Laos, killing both pilots.

4 October
A McDonnell Douglas F/A-18 of the Spanish Air Force crashed near Peralejos, Spain, killing the sole pilot on board.

8 October

A Cessna T-37 jet trainer of the Pakistan Air Force crashed in Swabi District, Khyber Pakhtunkhwa. The two pilots on board ejected safely.

9 October

A McDonnell Douglas F/A-18 of the Kuwait Air Force crashed in northern Kuwait, killing the sole pilot on board.

10 October

A Yakovlev Yak-130 jet trainer of the Russian Air Force crashed in Volgograd Oblast. The pilot ejected from the aircraft but was lightly injured.

15 October

A Boeing EA-18G electronic warfare jet of the US Navy crashed on a mountainside east of Mount Rainier, in Washington. The wreckage of the aircraft was found one day after it crashed. The two crew members who went missing after the crash were declared dead after a five day search.

22 October

A Northrop F-5EM of the Brazilian Air Force crashed near Natal, Rio Grande do Norte. The pilot ejected safely from the aircraft.

30 October
A Mil Mi-24 attack helicopter of the Air Force of the Democratic Republic of the Congo crashed in N'Dolo Airport, Barumbu commune, killing all 3 crew members on board.

An unidentified helicopter of the Islamic Revolutionary Guards Corps crashed in Zarrin Dasht County, receiving substantial damage and injuring one occupant.

=== November 2024 ===
1 November

Two Embraer T-27 Tucanos of the Brazilian Air Force collided mid-air near Pirassununga, São Paulo. One of the planes crashed after the pilot ejected from the aircraft, while the other one landed safely.

4 November

An autogyro of the IRGC crashed near Sirkan, Sistan and Baluchistan Province, killing the two occupants on board.

A Mikoyan MiG-29 of the Indian Air Force crashed near Agra, Uttar Pradesh. The sole pilot on board ejected safely.

5 November
An unidentified helicopter of the Egyptian Air Force crashed in Shaluffa, Suez Governorate, killing the two crew members on board.

6 November
A Yakovlev Yak-130 jet trainer of the Vietnamese Air Force crashed in Tây Sơn district, Bình Định province. The two pilots on board ejected safely from the aircraft.

9 November
A Mil Mi-8 helicopter of the Kazakhstan Ministry of Defense crashed near Saryzhar, Aktobe Region, killing one of the three people on board. The two survivors were injured.

21 November
A Diamond DA42 Twin Star plane of the Royal Moroccan Air Force crashed shortly after taking off from Ben Slimane Airport, killing the two pilots on board.

26 November
A Diamond DA20 Eclipse plane of the Ecuadorian Air Force crashed during a forced landing on a street in La Libertad, Santa Elena Province, killing the two crew members including pilot Diana Ruiz.

=== December 2024 ===
4 December
A HESA Yasin jet trainer of the Islamic Republic of Iran Air Force crashed near Firuzabad, Fars province, killing the two pilots on board.

9 December
A Bell UH-1 Iroquois helicopter of the Turkish Land Forces collided mid-air with another army helicopter in Keçiborlu District, Isparta Province. The UH-1 crashed, killing the 6 occupants on board, including the brigadier general commanding the School of Army Aviation. The other helicopter landed safely.

20 December
The engine of a Sikorsky CH-53E Super Stallion helicopter of the USMC caught fire midflight, forcing the aircraft to perform an emergency landing at Marine Corps Base Camp Pendleton. The four crew members managed to exit the burning helicopter safely.

22 December
A US Navy Boeing F/A-18 Super Hornet was shot down over the Red Sea in a friendly-fire incident. The aircraft had taken off from USS Harry S. Truman and was shot down by USS Gettysburg (CG-64). Both crew members ejected and survived.

29 December
A Bell 407GX helicopter of the Guatemalan Air Force crashed into the Chixoy River, in Ixcán Municipality, killing the two crew members on board.

== 2025 ==
=== January 2025 ===
1 January
A Mil Mi-28 of the Russian Air Force was lost under unknown circumstances in Voronezh Oblast, killing both crew.

5 January
An Indian Coast Guard HAL Dhruv Mk 3 helicopter crashed on landing at Porbandar Airport, Gujarat, India, killing all 3 people on board.

7 January
A Pakistan Air Force Karakorum K-8P jet trainer crashed in Risalpur, Khyber Pakhtunkhwa, and was destroyed. The sole pilot on board died in the crash.

22 January
A McDonnell Douglas F-4 Phantom II of the Islamic Republic of Iran Air Force crashed near Kabudarahang, Iran. Both pilots ejected safely and only suffered minor injuries.

28 January

A Lockheed Martin F-35 Lightning II of the USAF crashed at Eielson Air Force Base, Alaska. The pilot ejected safely from the aircraft.

29 January

A Sikorsky UH-60L Black Hawk, operated by the United States Army, collided mid-air with a Bombardier CRJ701ER, operated by PSA Airlines on behalf of American Airlines, over the Potomac River near Ronald Reagan Washington National Airport, Washington, D.C. The 64 occupants in the CRJ701 and the 3 crew members on board the Sikorsky UH-60L died in the collision.

=== February 2025 ===
6 February
A Hongdu JL-8 of the Air Force of Zimbabwe crashed near Gweru, killing the pilot.

A Dassault Mirage 2000 fighter jet of the Indian Air Force crashed in Shivpuri district, Madhya Pradesh. The two pilots on board ejected safely from the aircraft.

12 February
A Boeing EA-18G Growler jet of the US Navy crashed into the San Diego Bay, in California. Both pilots ejected from the aircraft and were rescued.

15 February
An AIDC T-5 Brave Eagle jet trainer of the Taiwanese Air Force crashed into the sea off the coast of Taitung. The sole pilot on board ejected from the aircraft and was rescued.

26 February
A Sudanese Air Force Antonov An-26 crashed in a residential area shortly after take off from Wadi Seidna Air Base, near Omdurman, due to a technical malfunction, killing all 17 occupants on board the aircraft and 29 people on the ground.

=== March 2025 ===
4 March
A FA-50 fighter jet of the Philippine Air Force with the tail number 002 went missing during a tactical night operation shortly prior reaching its destination, the Mactan–Benito Ebuen Air Base in Cebu. The missing aircraft was found "totally wrecked" at Mount Kalatungan in Talakag, Bukidnon the following day with its two occupants confirmed dead.

A Boeing C-17 Globemaster III of the United States Air Force was struck by two vacant private jets at Perot Field Fort Worth Alliance Airport during a strong wind storm, causing damage to the wing.

5 March
A Sikorky UH-60 Black Hawk helicopter of Joint Task Force Bravo was damaged after executing an emergency landing near Soto Cano Air Base, Comayagua Department. The five crew members were uninjured.

6 March

A KF-16 fighter jet of the Republic of Korea Air Force accidentally released eight bombs over Pocheon, Gyeonggi Province, injuring at least 29 people and damaging five buildings.

7 March
A SEPECAT Jaguar of the Indian Air Force crashed during a training exercise in Panchkula district, Haryana, due to an unspecified technical malfunction. The pilot ejected safely but the aircraft was destroyed.

An Antonov An-32 of the Indian Air Force crashed on landing at Bagdogra Airport. Although the aircraft was destroyed there were no fatalities.

13 March
A Grob G 120TP training aircraft of the Bangladesh Air Force made a belly landing after an emergency. The pilot was safe and the aircraft was repaired.

15 March
A Shenyang J-15 fighter jet of the People's Liberation Army Naval Air Force crashed in the island of Hainan. The pilot ejected safely from the aircraft.

17 March

A Republic of Korea Air Force IAI Heron drone crashed into a grounded KAI KUH-1 Surion helicopter at Yangju Air Base, destroying them both.

18 March

A Mil Mi-28 helicopter of the Russian Aerospace Forces crashed into the ground in Volosovsky District, Leningrad Oblast, Russia, killing both pilots.

19 March

A Sukhoi Su-30MKA of the Algerian Air Force crashed near Timokten, Adrar Province. One of the pilots was killed while the other one managed to eject safely from the aircraft.

21 March

A Karakorum K-8 jet trainer of the Sri Lanka Air Force crashed near Wariyapola, Kurunegala District. Both pilots ejected safely from the aircraft.

24 March

A Sukhoi Su-25 of the Russian Air Force crashed in Primorsky Krai. The sole pilot on board ejected safely from the aircraft.

25 March

Two French Air and Space Force display Dassault/Dornier Alpha Jet E's collided mid-air with each other during a training flight near Saint-Dizier – Robinson Air Base in Saint-Dizier, Haute-Marne, France, destroying both aircraft and damaging a building. No casualties were reported.

=== April 2025 ===
2 April

A Tupolev Tu-22M3 strategic bomber of the Russian Air Force crashed near Buret, Usolsky District. The 4 crew members ejected from the aircraft, but one of them died in the process.

A SEPECAT Jaguar fighter jet of the Indian Air Force crashed near the village of Suvarda, Jamnagar district. The two pilots ejected from the aircraft, however one of the pilots died while the other one was injured.

10 April

A Grob G 120TP trainer aircraft of the Mexican Air Force crashed near Ameca, Jalisco, killing the two crew members on board.

15 April

A Dassault Mirage 5 fighter jet of the Pakistan Air Force crashed near Ratta Tibba, Vehari District. The two pilots ejected safely from the aircraft.

28 April

A Boeing F/A-18E Super Hornet fighter jet of the US Navy fell of the deck of the USS Harry S. Truman alongside the tow tractor that was towing the plane into the hangar bay. Both the pilot and the driver of the tractor jumped out of their respective vehicles before they fell into the Red Sea.

29 April

A Bell 412EP helicopter of the Colombian Navy crashed into a lake near Malagana, Mahates, killing one of the four occupants on board.

=== May 2025 ===
6 May

A Boeing F/A-18E Super Hornet fighter jet of the US Navy fell into the Red Sea after failing to come to a halt while landing on the USS Harry S. Truman aircraft carrier. The two crew members on board the plane ejected before the aircraft fell into the water and were rescued by a helicopter.

7 May

A McDonnell Douglas F/A-18 Hornet fighter jet of the Finnish Air Force crashed near Rovaniemi Airport, Lapland. The sole pilot on board the plane ejected from the aircraft and was taken to a hospital.

9 May

A Bell 212 helicopter of the Sri Lanka Air Force crashed into the Maduru Oya Reservoir during a training mission. Twelve personnel were rescued, but six (four army and two air force) later died from their injuries.

14 May

A Kawasaki T-4 jet trainer of the Japan Air Self-Defense Force crashed into a reservoir near Inuyama shortly after taking off from Komaki Air Base. The two crew members on board died in the crash.

16 May

A General Dynamics F-16 of the Ukrainian Air Force crashed in an undisclosed location after the pilot ejected due to an incident on board the aircraft.

19 May

An unidentified training aircraft of the Egyptian Air Force crashed in an undisclosed location, killing its entire crew.

20 May

A KAI KT-1P of the Peruvian Air Force crashed in an islet south of the Paracas Peninsula. The sole pilot on board has not been found yet.

23 May

A Mil Mi-8 helicopter of the Russian Armed Forces crashed near Naryshkino, Oryol Oblast, killing its entire crew.

29 May
A Lockheed P-3 Orion maritime patrol aircraft of Republic of Korea Navy crashed near Pohang, North Gyeongsang Province, killing the four occupants on board the plane.

30 May

A Chengdu J-7 of the Air Force of Zimbabwe caught fire mid-air, lost control and crashed near Gweru in Midlands Province, Zimbabwe, killing the veteran pilot who returned for training.

=== June 2025 ===
10 June
An F-16D fighter jet of the Republic of Korea Air Force crashed on takeoff from Eielson Air Force Base near Fairbanks, Alaska. Two pilots ejected and were picked up by emergency crews.

11 June

A Boeing AH-64 Apache attack helicopter of the US Army crashed during a training exercise in Fort Campbell, killing one crew member and injuring another.

14 June

A Grob G 120 of the Kenya Air Force crashed in Kwale County, Kenya, killing the two pilots on board.

=== July 2025 ===
1 July
A Su-34 fighter-bomber of the Russian Aerospace Forces crashed during a training flight in Nizhny Novgorod Oblast, Russia, following a suspected mechanical failure. The two crew members safely ejected.

2 July

A Mil Mi-24 attack helicopter of the Uganda Air Force that had been deployed as part of the AUSSOM, crashed at the Aden Adde Airport, Mogadishu, killing five of the eight occupants on board and injuring the remaining three.

8 July
A United States Air Force Boeing KC-46 Pegasus' refueling boom detached over the Atlantic Ocean. The aircraft made an emergency landing at Seymour Johnson Air Force Base, and was substantially damaged.

9 July

An Indian Air Force trainer aircraft crashed near Churu, Rajasthan, killing its two pilots.

21 July

A Bangladesh Air Force twin seater trainer aircraft, Chengdu F-7, crashed at Milestone College, Dhaka, killing 36 people, including the pilot, and injuring at least 173 others.

22 July

A Dassault Mirage 2000 fighter jet of the Ukrainian Air Force crashed in Volyn Oblast, the pilot ejected safely from the aircraft and was rescued.

25 July

A Eurocopter EC145 of the Kazakh Air Defense Forces crashed into Lake Sorbulak, Almaty Region, killing all three occupants on board.

28 July

A Dassault/Dornier Alpha Jet of the Royal Moroccan Air Force crashed shortly after taking off from Fès–Saïs Airport, killing the two pilots on board.

29 July

A Eurocopter EC135 of the German Air Force crashed near Leipzig, Saxony, killing two crew members, while another went missing.

A Cessna 208B Grand Caravan of the Bolivarian Military Aviation of Venezuela, crashed near La Reforma, Amazonas, after a flight from Cacique Aramare Airport. Seven of the 10 people on board were killed.

30 July

A Lockheed Martin F-35C of the US Navy crashed near Naval Air Station Lemoore, California, the pilot ejected safely from the aircraft.

An Embraer A29 Super Tucano of the Brazilian Air Force crashed near Porto Ferreira after colliding in mid-air with another Super Tucano of the same force. The pilot of the crashed aircraft ejected safely from the plane, while the other Super Tucano managed to land with no issues.

=== August 2025 ===
6 August

An Harbin Z-9 of the Ghana Air Force crashed in the Ashanti Region of Ghana. All eight people on board were killed including the country's minister of defence, Edward Omane Boamah, and minister of environment, Ibrahim Murtala Muhammed.

7 August
A Mitsubishi F-2 fighter jet of the Japan Air Self-Defense Force crashed into the Pacific Ocean off the coast of Ibaraki Prefecture in Japan during a training flight. The pilot safely ejected and was rescued.

20 August

A Boeing F/A-18E Super Hornet of the US Navy crashed into the sea off the coast of Virginia, the sole pilot on board ejected safely from the aircraft and was rescued.

21 August

A McDonnell Douglas F/A-18 Hornet of the Royal Malaysian Air Force crashed shortly after taking off from Sultan Haji Ahmad Shah Airport. The two pilots on board ejected safely from the aircraft.

22 August

A Sikorsky CH-53E Super Stallion of the US Marine Corps caught fire while on the ground at Marine Corps Air Ground Combat Center Twentynine Palms, in California. Everyone on board the aircraft managed to evacuate safely and without injuries.

28 August

A General Dynamics F-16 of the Polish Air Force crashed while performing an aerobatic manoeuvre over Radom Airport, killing the sole pilot on board.

=== September 2025 ===
1 September

A Pakistani Army helicopter crashed during a test landing in Chilas, Gilgit-Baltistan, killing all five on board.

9 September

A CASA C-295M of the Mexican Air Force performed a hard landing on a runway of the Air Force Base N°1, adjacent to the Felipe Ángeles International Airport, damaging the tail of the aircraft. None of the crew members were injured.

10 September

A helicopter of the Afghan Air Force crashed in Tulak District, Ghor Province. No one on board the helicopter died.

17 September

A MH-60 Black Hawk helicopter operated by the 160th SOAR(A) of the US Army crashed near Summit Lake, Washington, killing all four occupants on board.

23 September
A KF-16 fighter jet of the Republic of Korea Air Force underwent a runway excursion at an air base in Chungju. No casualties were reported.

30 September

A T-45 Goshawk jet trainer of the US Navy crashed near Naval Air Station Kingsville, Texas. The pilot ejected safely from the plane.

=== October 2025 ===
1 October

A SIAI-Marchetti SF.260 of the Italian Air Force crashed in Circeo National Park, near Sabaudia, killing the two crew members on board.

3 October

An Enstrom 480 helicopter of the Bolivarian Military Aviation of Venezuela crashed in Girardot Municipality, Aragua, killing the two crew members on board.

8 October
A Tecnam P2002 JF of the Hellenic Air Force crashed at Tatoi Airport, injuring the two pilots on board.

A Eurocopter AS350 B2 helicopter of the Ecuadorian Army crashed near La Merced de Buenos Aires, San Miguel de Urcuquí Canton, injuring the four occupants on board.

A Cessna 337 of the Royal Thai Navy made a gear-up landing on a runway of Phuket International Airport. No one on board the plane was injured.

9 October
A Mikoyan MiG-31 of the Russian Aerospace Forces crashed in Lipetsk Oblast, the two pilots ejected safely from the aircraft.

15 October

16 October
A Sikorsky UH-60 Black Hawk helicopter of the Chilean Air Force crashed in Aysén Region, killing one out of four crew members on board.

A Bell AH-1Z Viper attack helicopter operated by the HMLA-369 squadron of the US Marines crashed near Imperial Gables, California. One of the pilots died while the other one was injured.

17 October
A Sukhoi Su-30SM of the Russian Naval Aviation crashed while carrying out a mission to destroy drones in Crimea, Ukraine. The crew ejected and was recovered by helicopter. The Ukrainian Navy claimed the Su-30 crashed because it was accidentally shot down by Russian air defences.

23 October
A USAF L3Harris OA-1K Skyraider II of the Air Force Special Operations Command crash landed in a field after takeoff from OKC Will Rogers International Airport in Oklahoma City, Oklahoma.

26 October
A MH-60R Sea Hawk of the United States Navy crashed into the South China Sea after takeoff from USS Nimitz. The three crew were rescued.

A Boeing F/A-18F Super Hornet of the United States Navy crashed into the South China Sea after takeoff from USS Nimitz. The two crew were rescued.

27 October
A Mil Mi-17 helicopter of the Peruvian Army crashed while trying to land in Chagal, Pataz District, killing one of the occupants on board.

=== November 2025 ===
4 November

A Bell UH-1H Super Huey helicopter of the Philippine Air Force crashed on its way to conduct disaster reconnaissance in the aftermath of Typhoon Kalmaegi in Loreto, Agusan del Sur, killing six people.

A cargo aircraft of the Sudanese Armed Forces crashed near Babanusa after carrying out a resupply mission after a suspected wing malfunction, killing its entire crew.

5 November

A Sikorsky S-70i helicopter of the Philippine Air Force made an emergency landing due to engine trouble in a rice field in Barangay Panian, Saint Bernard, Southern Leyte. There were no fatalities.

11 November

A Lockheed C-130 Hercules of the Turkish Armed Forces crashed in Signagi Municipality, Georgia, killing all 20 people on board.

13 November

A Sukhoi Su-30 of the Russian Air Force crashed in the Republic of Karelia, killing the two crew members on board.

14 November

A Pilatus PC-7 Mk2 of the Indian Air Force crashed during a routine training flight in Chennai, India. The pilot ejected and survived.

16 November

A Bell UH-1N Twin Huey helicopter of the Royal Thai Army made an emergency landing due to engine trouble in a rice field in Khun Yuam district, Mae Hong Son province due to engine problems. There were no fatalities.

21 November

A HAL Tejas fighter jet of the Indian Air Force crashed at the Al Maktoum International Airport while performing a flight demonstration, killing the pilot.

24 November
An MQ-9 Reaper drone of the US Air Force crashed into the Yellow Sea off Maldo-ri island in Gunsan, South Korea.

30 November
A Bell 212 helicopter of the Sri Lanka Air Force crashed during Cyclone Ditwah relief operations in Wennappuwa, North Western Province, Sri Lanka. The pilot was killed and four others were injured.

=== December 2025 ===
3 December

A F-16 Fighting Falcon of the USAF Thunderbirds air demonstration squadron crashed near Trona, San Bernardino County, California, the sole pilot on board ejected safely from the aircraft.

6 December

A Dassault/Dornier Alpha Jet of the Nigerian Air Force crashed while climbing during a routine test flight from Niger State. Both pilots ejected and survived.

9 December

An Antonov An-22 of the Russian Air Force crashed during a test flight following repairs in Ivanovo Oblast. All seven people on board were killed.

An Ilyushin Il-76 cargo plane of the Sudanese Air Force crashed near Port Sudan, killing all crew members on board.

19 December

A Mil Mi-24 of the Ukrainian Army Aviation was lost under unknown circumstances during a combat mission in Ukraine. All four crew members were killed.

22 December

A Beech King Air 350i of the Mexican Navy crashed into Galveston Bay during heavy fog while on approach to Scholes International Airport at Galveston in Galveston, Texas, United States. The plane was transporting a pediatric patient. Six people were killed and two others were rescued.

A Bell 212 of the Royal Thai Army experienced a loss of control and a hard landing at Surin Airport in northeastern Thailand, injuring all four crew.

31 December

A Westland Super Lynx Mk100 of the Royal Malaysian Navy ditched off Klebang Beach in Malacca, Malaysia. All four crew members were rescued and transported to hospital.

== 2026 ==
=== January 2026 ===
1 January

A General Atomics MQ-9 Reaper of the United States Air Force crashed in mountainous terrain in Maidan Shar, Maidan Wardak Province, Afghanistan.

2 January

A KAI T-50 Golden Eagle of the Republic of Korea Air Force flipped upside down during an emergency landing at Gwangju Air Base in Gwangju, South Korea. Both pilots escaped unharmed.

A CASC Rainbow of the Nigerian Air Force crashed into a forest after a technical failure in Kontagora, Niger State, Nigeria.

6 January

A General Dynamics F-16 Fighting Falcon of the Republic of China Air Force crashed into the sea after a malfunction of the main on board computer near the Chiashan Air Force Base in Hualien County, Taiwan. The pilot was reported missing.

14 January

An ACSL SOTEN recon unmanned aerial vehicle of the Japan Ground Self-Defense Force was reported missing during a training flight in Kirishima, Kagoshima Prefecture, Japan.

A SAN Jodel D.140 Mousquetaire of the French Air and Space Force suffered an engine failure and made an emergency landing in a field near Cozes, Nouvelle-Aquitaine, France. All four occupants escaped unharmed.

16 January

A Sikorsky UH-60 Black Hawk of the Israel Defense Forces fell from its harnesses and hit the ground while being airlifted near Gush Etzion, West Bank. No injuries were reported but the aircraft was damaged.

21 January

A Pipistrel Virus of the Indian Air Force crashed into a pond after an engine failure in Prayagraj, Uttar Pradesh, India. No injuries were reported.

28 January

A Yakovlev Yak-130 of the Vietnam Air Defence - Air Force crashed into a mountain in Đắk Lắk province, Vietnam. The pilot ejected and suffered minor injuries.

29 January

A Beechcraft AT-6 Wolverine of the Royal Thai Air Force crashed into a forest during a flight training mission near Huai Fang, Chom Thong district, Chiang Mai province, Thailand, killing both occupants.

30 January

A Beechcraft Bonanza G36 of the Indonesian Navy skidded off the runway at Juanda International Airport in Surabaya while performing emergency exercise. The incident was caused by sudden downdraft. The two occupants were safe and the aircraft suffered minor damage.

=== February 2026 ===
6 February

A Mil Mi-24 of the Ukrainian Army Aviation lost control and crashed during a combat flight in Chernihiv Oblast, Ukraine, killing all three crew members.

7 February

A HAL Tejas of the Indian Air Force suffered a runway excursion in India. The pilot was safe.

9 February

An AH-1S Cobra attack helicopter of the Republic of Korea Army crashed in Gapyeong County, killing the two crew members on board.

19 February

A McDonnell Douglas F-4 Phantom II of the Islamic Republic of Iran Air Force crashed during a training flight in Hamadan province, killing one of the two pilots on board.

22 February

A Mil Mi-17 helicopter of the Peruvian Air Force crashed in Chala Viejo, Chala District, killing all four crew members and 11 passengers on board.

24 February

A Bell AH-1 SuperCobra of the Islamic Republic of Iran Army Aviation crashed into a fruit market in Dorcheh, killing the two crew members on board and two people on the ground.

A Dornier 328 of the United States Air Force collided with a concrete barrier along a highway in Laoac, Pangasinan, Philippines, while undergoing contingency training, injuring its five crew and damaging the aircraft.

25 February

A General Dynamics F-16 Fighting Falcon of the Turkish Air Force crashed near a highway shortly after takeoff from Balıkesir, Turkey, killing the pilot.

A Sukhoi Su-30 of the Kazakhstan Air Force crashed under unknown circumstances during a regular training flight in Karaganda Region, Kazakhstan. Both pilots safely ejected.

A General Dynamics F-16 Fighting Falcon of the Republic of Korea Air Force crashed under unknown circumstances near Yeongju, North Gyeongsang Province, South Korea. The pilot ejected safely.

27 February

A C-130 Hercules of the Bolivian Air Force overran the runway of El Alto International Airport while trying to land. The plane impacted multiple vehicles on a highway outside the airport, killing one crew member and 23 people on the ground.

=== March 2026 ===
5 March

A Beechcraft 1900 of the Algerian Air Force crashed while landing at Boufarik Airport near Boufarik, Blida Province, Algeria, killing four crew members and injuring two others.

A Sukhoi Su-30MKI of the Indian Air Force crashed during a training mission in Karbi Anglong district, Assam, India, killing both pilots.

9 March

A helicopter of the United Arab Emirates Armed Forces crashed at an undisclosed location in the United Arab Emirates after a technical malfunction, killing at least two people.

12 March

A Boeing KC-135 Stratotanker of the United States Air Force crashed in western Iraq after an incident involving two aircraft. All six crew members on board the KC-135 died while the other aircraft landed safely. The United States Central Command stated that the accident was not caused by friendly or hostile fire.

22 March

A helicopter of the Armed Forces of Qatar crashed in the territorial waters of Qatar, killing all seven occupants on board.

23 March

A Lockheed C-130 Hercules of the Colombian Air Force crashed shortly after taking off from Caucayá Airport, Putumayo Department, killing 69 and injuring 57.

31 March

An Antonov An-26 transport plane of the Russian Air Force crashed into a cliff in Crimea, killing the seven crew members and 23 passengers on board.

A Lockheed Martin F-35 fighter jet of the United States Air Force crashed at the Nevada Test and Training Range. The pilot ejected from the aircraft but suffered minor injuries.

=== April 2026 ===
3 April

A Sukhoi Su-30 fighter jet of the Russian Armed Forces crashed in Crimea. The two crew members ejected from the aircraft.

=== May 2026 ===
12 May

A Northrop T-38 Talon jet trainer of the United States Air Force crashed in Lamar County, Alabama. The two pilots on board the plane ejected from the aircraft.

15 May

A Boeing AH-64 Apache of the United States Army made an emergency landing in a rice field in Hyeondeok-myeon, Pyeongtaek, South Korea. There are no injuries and the helicopter is not damaged.

17 May

Two Boeing EA-18G Growlers of the United States Navy collided mid-air over the Mountain Home Air Force Base during an air show. All four crew members ejected without issues.

20 May

An SF-260 trainer aircraft of the Philippine Air Force crashed in Tuba, Benguet, killing the two pilots.

A Chengdu FT-7PG trainer aircraft of the Pakistan Air Force crashed in Mianwali, Punjab. Both pilots ejected safely.

A HAL Cheetah helicopter of the Indian Army crashed near Leh, Ladakh. The three occupants sustained minor injuries.

26 May

A Boeing T-45C Goshawk trainer aircraft of the United States Navy crashed on a farmland in Noxubee County, Mississippi. Both pilots ejected safely.

=== June 2026 ===
2 June

A T-34 Mentor trainer aircraft of the Republic of China Air Force crashed at Gangshan Air Force Base, Gangshan District, killing the two pilots on board.

3 June

A Merlin Mk4 helicopter of the Royal Navy crashed into a field in Sourton Down near Okehampton in Devon, England, killing its three occupants.

An ENAER T-35 Pillán trainer aircraft of the Chilean Air Force crash landed near La Serena. The two pilots on board the plane survived but the aircraft was destroyed in the ensuing post-crash fire.

8 June

A Boeing AH-64 Apache of the United States Army crashed after being struck by an Iranian drone off the coast of Oman, both of the pilots on board survived the crash and were rescued.

10 June

A Mil Mi-17 helicopter of the Pakistani Army crashed near Muzaffarabad, Azad Kashmir, killing the 22 occupants on board.

13 June

An Antonov An-32 of the Indian Air Force veered off the runway of Jorhat Air Force Station. The plane broke into two pieces before catching on fire, five of the six occupants on board died in the accident.

A McDonnell Douglas F/A-18 Hornet of the United States Marine Corps crashed into a hill near Rimrock Lake, Washington. The pilot safely ejected but the crash ignited a wildfire.

15 June
A PAC MFI-17 Mushshak of the Pakistan Air Force crashed under unknown circumstances near Mardan, Khyber Pakhtunkhwa, killing both pilots.

A Tupolev Tu-22M3 of the Russian Air Force crashed in Irkutsk Oblast. All four crew members ejected from the aircraft.

A Boeing B-52 Stratofortress of the United States Air Force crashed shortly after takeoff from Edwards Air Force Base in California. All 8 occupants on board were killed.

16 June
A Sukhoi Su-24 of the Ukrainian Air Force crashed under unknown circumstances in Khmelnytskyi Oblast, killing the pilot and navigator.

19 June
A Harbin Z-9 of the Armed Forces of Equatorial Guinea crashed into a mountain range located between the cities of Niefang and Evinayong. All four occupants on board the helicopter died in the crash.

21 June
A Cessna 210 Centurion of the Bolivian Air Force crashed under unknown circumstances in Cochabamba Department, killing all six occupants.

22 June
A Sikorsky MH-60 Jayhawk of the United States Coast Guard crashed near Sitka, Alaska during a training flight. The four crew members suffered minor injuries.

=== July 2026 ===
1 July
A Sikorsky MH-60S Seahawk of the United States Navy performed an emergency landing in the Arabian Sea. Three of the four occupants on board were rescued and one went missing.

9 July
A General Dynamics F-16 Fighting Falcon of the Hellenic Air Force performed a belly landing and caught fire at Zakynthos International Airport. The pilot survived the accident.

23 July
A Sukhoi Su-57 fighter jet of the Russian Air Force crashed in Moscow Oblast. The pilot ejected from the aircraft.

A Bell UH-1Y Venom helicopter of the Czech Armed Forces crashed at a Czech Air Force base in Náměšť nad Oslavou. One of the occupants died while the four others were injured.

27 July
A Eurocopter UH-72 Lakota helicopter of the United States Army crashed near Opp, Alabama, injuring the three occupants on board.

29 July
An F-16 Fighting Falcon of the Ukrainian Air Force crashed in an undisclosed location. The pilot ejected from the aircraft.

31 July
A F-35B fighter jet of the United States Marine Corps crashed near Marine Corps Air Station Miramar. The pilot ejected from the aircraft but was injured.

=== August 2026 ===
3 August
A fighter aircraft of the Myanmar Air Force crashed in Hmawbi Township after a bird was ingested by the engine of the aircraft. The pilot ejected from the aircraft.

10 August
A MiG-29 of the Ukrainian Air Force suffered a technical malfunction and crashed in Berezivka Raion. The pilot ejected from the aircraft.

12 August
A Boeing AH-64 Apache of the United States Army crashed in Salado, Texas, killing the two crew members on board.

An F-16 Fighting Falcon of the Turkish Air Force crashed in Yalova Province. The pilot ejected from the aircraft.

24 August
A Sukhoi Su-30 fighter jet of the Indonesian Air Force overshot the runway of Sultan Hasanuddin International Airport in Makassar before coming to rest in a grassy, sloped area.

A Saab JAS 39 Gripen fighter jet of the Hungarian Air Force crashed near Szolnok. The sole pilot on board ejected from the aircraft.

=== September 2026 ===
5 September
A Greek Air Force F-4E Phantom crashed during the Tanagra air show. Both pilots were killed in the crash.

15 September
A Northrop Grumman RQ-4 Global Hawk of the Japan Air Self-Defense Force crashed into the Sea of Japan off Tottori Prefecture.

17 September
An F-16 fighter jet of the Texas Air National Guard crashed near Traverse City, Michigan. The pilot ejected from the aircraft.

22 September
An F-16 fighter jet of the United States Air Force crashed near Spangdahlem Air Base, Germany. The pilot ejected from the aircraft.

23 September
A BAE Systems Hawk jet trainer of the Royal Air Force crashed near Pencarnisiog, Anglesey. The two pilots ejected from the aircraft.

28 September
A Boeing EA-18G Growler of the United States Navy suffered an accident while trying to land on the flight deck of the USS Dwight D. Eisenhower, which was sailing off the coast of Virginia at the time of the accident. The two pilots of the Growler ejected from the aircraft after the arresting gear of the ship failed. Eight sailors on board the ship were injured due to the accident.

29 September
A Tupolev Tu-95 strategic bomber of the Russian Air Force crashed near Krasnoyarovo, Amur Oblast, killing six of the seven occupants on board.

=== October 2026 ===
5 October

An ATR-42 aircraft of the Nigerian Air Force crashed into a swamp near a naval base in Ondo State, killing all 25 people on board.

8 October
A V-22 Osprey of the United States Marine Corps made a hard landing and caught on fire in the Bladen Lakes State Forest, North Carolina. One of the four crew members on board suffered burn injuries.

12 October
A PAC MFI-17 Mushshak trainer aircraft of the Pakistan Army crashed near Nawan Killi, Quetta, killing the two pilots on board.

20 October
A Dassault Mirage 2000 fighter jet of the French Air Force crashed near Rogéville, killing the two occupants on board.

21 October
A Sukhoi Su-30 fighter jet of the Russian Armed Forces crashed near Chernyakhovsk Air Base, Kaliningrad Oblast. The two pilots ejected from the aircraft.

22 October
A Beechcraft T-6A Texan II of the United States Air Force crashed near Seguin, Texas, due to the pilots decision to eject after receiving an unsafe landing gear warning.

23 October
Two SF-260 trainer aircraft of the Philippine Air Force crashed after colliding with each other mid-air over Fernando Air Base in Lipa, Batangas, killing four pilots.

29 October

A Boeing CH-47 Chinook of the Italian Army that was participating in Operation Althea crashed near Brčko, Bosnia, killing four and injuring 11.

=== November 2026 ===
3 November
An AgustaWestland AW109K helicopter of the Peruvian Army crashed in El Cenepa District, Condorcanqui province, while it was participating in a demining operation. One of the occupants died and three others were injured.

4 November
A Mil Mi-17V-5 helicopter of the Indonesian Army crashed into the waters off Seruyan Regency, Central Kalimantan while collecting water for a firefighting mission. Three occupants died and five were injured.

12 November
An S-70 helicopter of the Turkish Armed Forces crashed in Malatya, killing four people.

17 November
A Mikoyan MiG-29 fighter jet of the Serbian Air Force crashed near Stara Pazova, killing the pilot.

An Antonov An-12 transport plane of the Russian Armed Forces crashed near the village of Yagunovo, Kemerovo Oblast. All 19 people on board were killed. Russia's defence ministry said the preliminary cause was a technical malfunction.

18 November
A Sikorsky UH-60 Black Hawk helicopter of the Royal Jordanian Air Force crashed in an undisclosed location, injuring the five occupants on board.

== See also ==
- Lists of accidents and incidents involving military aircraft
