= Arcturus (disambiguation) =

Arcturus is a star.

Arcturus may also refer to:

== Places ==
- Arcturus, Queensland, Australia, a locality in the Central Highlands Region
- Arcturus, Virginia, United States, a neighborhood
- Arcturus, Zimbabwe, a village

== Ships ==
- USS Arcturus, various US Navy ships
- Arcturus-class attack cargo ship, a World War II-era class of US Navy ships
- HMS Arcturus (J283), a Second World War Royal Navy Algerine-class minesweeper
- HSwMS Arcturus (1909), a Royal Swedish Navy 1.-class torpedo boat
- HSwMS Arcturus (T110), a Royal Swedish Navy torpedo boat in service from 1957 to 1981 - see List of torpedo boats of the Swedish Navy
- HSwMS Arcturus (A503), a Royal Swedish Navy training ship launched in 2008 - see List of Swedish Navy ships: A-B
- Arcturus-class submarine, a planned Russian class of ballistic missile submarines
- Arcturus (steamship), a passenger ship of the Finland Steamship Company
- SS Arcturus, a freighter launched in 1919 and owned by the Union Sulphur Company

== Aircraft ==
- Arcturus, the name of one of five US Coast Guard General Aviation PJ flying boats
- CP-140A Arcturus, a variant of the Lockheed CP-140 Aurora Royal Canadian Air Force maritime patrol aircraft
- Arcturus T-20, former name of the AeroVironment T-20, an unmanned aerial vehicle introduced in 2009

== Fauna ==
- Arcturus (crustacean), an isopod genus of the family Arcturidae
- Arcturus, a genus of clams invalidly established by Humphrey in Sowerby, 1839; now Cyclocardia

== Fictional characters ==
- Arcturus (Ninjago), a character in Ninjago
- Arcturus Mengsk, the leader of the Sons of Korhal and later Emperor of the Terran Dominion in the StarCraft computer game series
- Arcturus, one of the Triangulum invaders in Shin Megami Tensei: Devil Survivor 2

== Other uses ==
- Arcturus Z. Conrad (1855-1937), Christian author, theologian and pastor
- Arcturus (band), a Norwegian avant-garde metal band
- Gallery Arcturus, a public art museum in Toronto, Canada
- Arcturus variant, an unofficial nickname of the XBB.1.16 strain of the SARS-CoV-2 Omicron variant
- ARCTUROS (organization), an environmental organization in Greece
- Arcturus expedition, 1925 scientific expedition from New York to the Sargasso Sea
- Arcturus: The Curse and Loss of Divinity, a 2000 computer role playing game from Gravity
- Arcturus Therapeutics, an American biotech company

== See also ==
- Arcturus Formation, a geologic formation in Utah, United States
- Arcturus Group, a geologic group in Nevada, United States
- Arcturian (disambiguation)
