= 2021 Turkish Air Force Eurocopter AS532 Cougar crash =

Helicopter crash in Turkey

Coordinates: 38°30′08″N 42°16′53″E

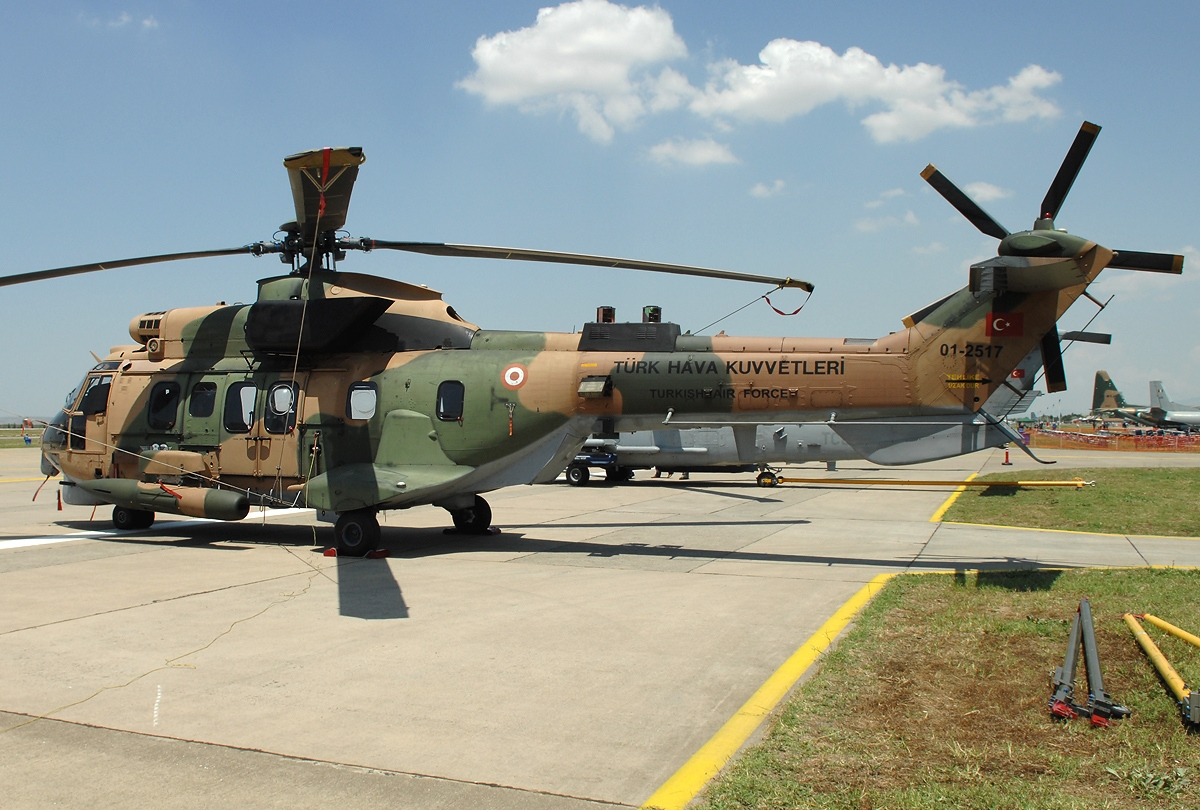
- A Turkish Air Force AS532 Cougar, similar to the helicopter that crashed

Accident
- Date: 4 March 2021
- Summary: Crashed into terrain; under investigation
- Site: near Tatvan, Bitlis, Turkey

Aircraft
- Aircraft type: Eurocopter AS532 Cougar
- Operator: Turkish Air Force
- Flight origin: Bingöl, Turkey
- Destination: Tatvan, Bitlis, Turkey
- Occupants: 13
- Fatalities: 11
- Injuries: 2
- Survivors: 2

The 2021 Turkish Air Force Eurocopter AS532 Cougar crash occurred on 4 March 2021, when a Turkish Air Force (TAF) Eurocopter AS532 Cougar, en route to Tatvan District in Bitlis, Turkey, crashed in Bitlis Province. Eleven Turkish servicemen on board were killed in the crash, while two other servicemen survived the crash. Initially, five injured servicemen were hospitalized, though three of them, including Lieutenant General Osman Erbaş, the commander of the 8th Corps, later died of their injuries.

It was the fourth incident in Turkey involving the helicopter model, which have caused the deaths of 39 people, including two high-ranking military officers.

== Crash ==
The Turkish Air Force (TAF) Eurocopter AS532 Cougar took off from Bingöl in eastern Turkey, at 10:55 am GMT. The helicopter was en route to Tatvan in Turkey's predominantly Kurdish-populated Bitlis Province, where the Turkish forces have been combating militants of the banned Kurdistan Workers' Party (PKK), designated as a terrorist group by the United States and the European Union. It lost contact at around 11:25 am GMT. The Turkish Ministry of National Defence (MoD) stated that the helicopter crashed in a rural area near Tatvan. The crash happened in an area blanketed in snow and with visibility hampered by thick clouds in the mountainous region. Locals rushed to the crash site to help the survivors as soon they heard the news of the crash. One of the survivors was partially buried under the wreck and snow.

Initially, eight Turkish servicemen on board were killed in the crash, while five other servicemen were injured. The injured servicemen were immediately hospitalized, though three of them, including the lieutenant general Osman Erbaş, the commander of the 8th Corps, later died of their injuries.

== Aftermath ==
The crash was reported by the Turkish MoD. The ministry added that there were "efforts underway for the transfer of the injured personnel to the hospital". It also stated that an investigation was launched right away. The Turkish military immediately launched a search and rescue mission, dispatching a party consisting of an unmanned aerial vehicle, a CASA/IPTN CN-235 transport aircraft, and a helicopter.

== Reactions ==
=== Domestic ===
The President of Turkey, Recep Tayyip Erdoğan, wished God's mercy upon the perished servicemen soldiers and extended his condolences to their families, the Turkish nation and the Turkish Armed Forces. Vice President of Turkey, Fuat Oktay, extended condolences to families of the fallen soldiers. Turkish Ministry of National Defence conveyed its sympathies to their families, friends and country, calling the incident a "deeply saddening accident". Turkish Minister of Foreign Affairs, Mevlüt Çavuşoğlu, Turkish Presidential Communications Director, Fahrettin Altun, the Turkish Minister of Health, Fahrettin Koca, CHP chairman Kemal Kılıçdaroğlu, and MHP chairman Devlet Bahçeli, expressed their condolences over the accident.

=== International ===
The United States embassy to Turkey in Ankara offered "its sincere condolences" for the Turkish soldiers killed and injured in the crash, wishing a "rapid recovery to the injured". Head of the European Union Delegation to Turkey, Nikolaus Meyer-Landrut, offered his sympathies for those affected by the crash, while the NATO Secretary-General Jens Stoltenberg called the Turkish Foreign Minister Mevlüt Çavuşoğlu to extend his condolences. The President of Azerbaijan, Ilham Aliyev, expressed his sorrow to President Erdoğan in a phone call, while the Azerbaijani Minister of Foreign Affairs, Jeyhun Bayramov, expressed his condolences to the families and friends of the killed, as well as the Turkish nation, and expressed his sorrow over the incident.

== See also ==
- List of accidents and incidents involving military aircraft (2020–present)
