= Dongshi Natural Ecological Exhibition Center =

Science center in Dongshi, Chiayi County, Taiwan

- 東石自然生態展示館
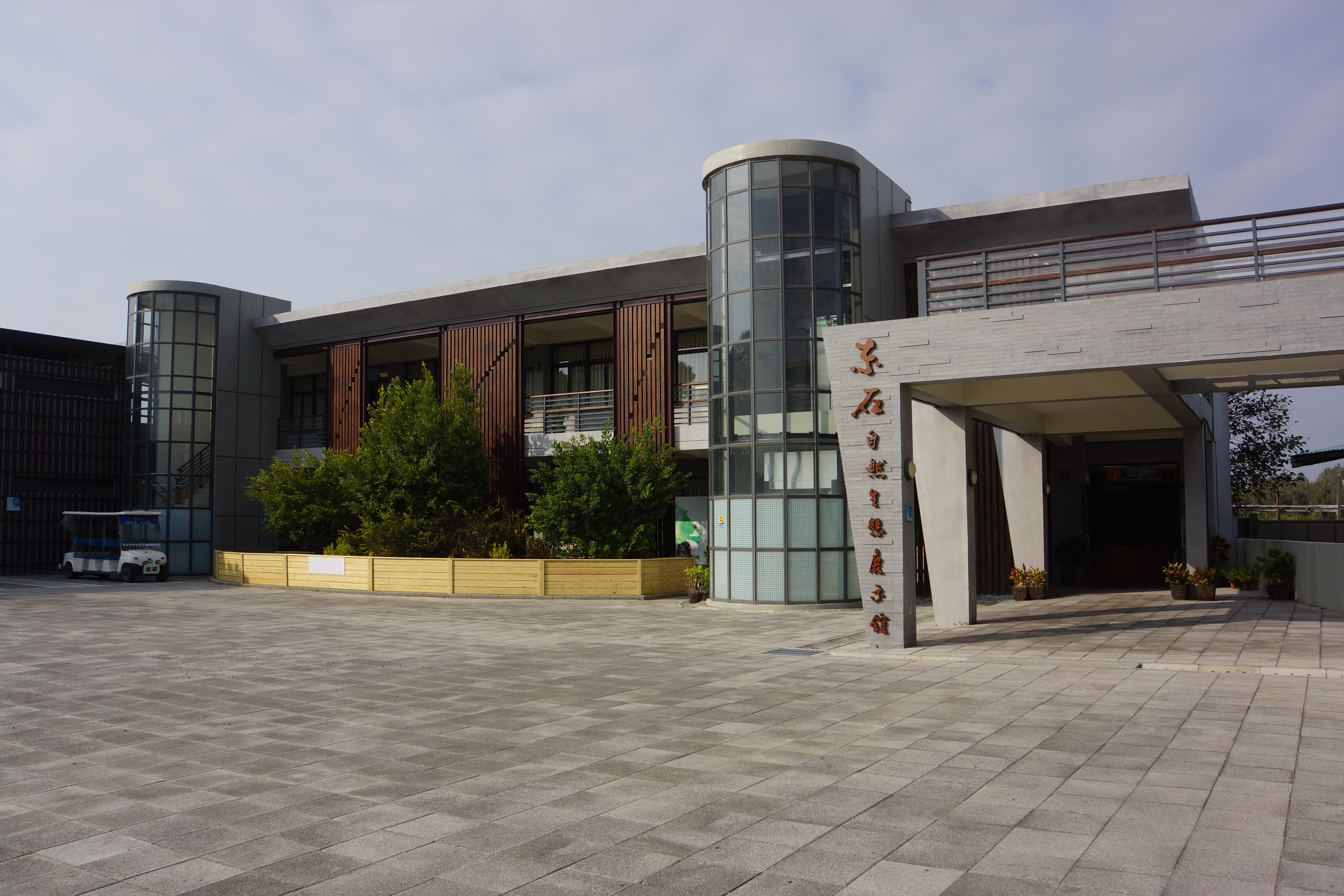
- Interactive map of the Dongshi Natural Ecological Exhibition Center area

General information
- Type: science center
- Location: Dongshi, Chiayi County, Taiwan
- Coordinates: 23°30′31.6″N 120°09′38.8″E

Technical details
- Floor count: 2

The Dongshi Natural Ecological Exhibition Center (traditional Chinese: 東石自然生態展示館; simplified Chinese: 东石自然生态展示馆; pinyin: Dōngshí Zìrán Shēngtài Zhǎnshì Guǎn) is a science center in Dongshi Township, Chiayi County, Taiwan.

== Architecture ==
The center is housed in a 2-story building.

== Exhibitions ==
The center exhibits the history and introduction to rural villages, fishing tools and wetland ecology.

== See also ==
- Aogu Wetland
- List of science centers#Asia
