= 4th Commando Brigade (Turkey) =

- Country: Turkey
- Allegiance: Turkish Army
- Branch: Army
- Type: Infantry
- Size: Brigade
- Part of: 8th Corps
- Garrison/HQ: Tunceli
- Mottos: "Geceler ve Dağlar Bizimdir!" "Nights and mountains are ours!"

The 4th Commando Brigade is one of the 12 infantry brigades in Turkish Land Forces. It's under the 8th Corps and is headquartered at Tunceli. It was involved in Operation Olive Branch (2018) in Syria and fought in Operation Claw (2019) with the Gendarmerie Special Operations in Iraq.

== See also ==
- List of commando units#Turkey
