= Arcturian =

Arcturian may refer to:

- Arcturian (album), a 2015 album by Arcturus
- Arcturian (Star Trek), a fictional species in the Star Trek franchise
- Arcturians (New Age), a purported extraterrestrial civilization

== See also ==
- Arcturus (disambiguation)
