= 8th Corps (Turkey) =

Turkish infantry corps

- Founded: 1921
- Country: Turkey
- Branch: Turkish Army
- Type: Infantry
- Size: Corps
- Part of: Third Army
- Headquarters: Elazığ, Elazığ Province

Commanders
- Major general: Tamer Atay

The 8th Corps (Turkish: 8. Kolordu) is a field corps of the Turkish Army. It is headquartered at Elazığ in Elazığ Province.

From 1923, with its headquarters at Tokat it comprised the 12th and 15th Divisions. Salih Omurtak commanded the corps as a major general in the 1930s. In 1945 it remained under Third Army with the same two divisions attached, the 12th at Sivas and the 15th at Samsun.

In 1968, Headquarters 10th Infantry Division was moved from Elazig to Tatvan. At the time, the Eighth Corps Command was located in Malatya. The vacated divisional headquarters in the Akpınar neighbourhood of Elazig, originally the seat of the Fourth General Inspectorate (1938-1948), then became the location of the Eighth Corps Command on or about 18 July 1969.

During the 1998–2004 period, the Turkish Land Forces maintained two brigades separately in Tatvan, Bitlis Province, separated by physical location. The 10th Infantry Brigade (10. Piyade Tugayı) operated out of the Sorgun Barracks (Sorgun Kışlası) beside Lake Van. Yaşar Güler commanded this brigade about 2001. The 6th Armored Brigade (6. Zırhlı Tugayı) occupied the Kuyaş and Vural Barracks (Kuyaş ve Vural Kışla Binaları). These compounds contained vehicle bays, tank maintenance garages, and fortified ammunition depots. Among the units of the 6th Armoured Brigade was the 2nd Tank Battalion (2. Tank Taburu). The two brigades remained at Tatvan until a reorganisation in the mid-2000s, during which the tanks of the 6th Armoured Brigade were reassigned. The 10th Motorized Infantry Brigade then took over the Kuyaş and Vural barracks.

The 10th Brigade changed over from an infantry to a commando brigade in November 2015.

In August 2017, the newly appointed corps Commander, Lieutenant General Osman Erbaş, visited Tunceli. In February 2019, General Erbas visited the Governor of Bingol, accompanied by the deputy commander of the 49th Commando Brigade (49'uncu Komando Tugayı). General Erbas died in a 2021 helicopter crash.

The 8th Corps is currently led by Tümgeneral Ümit Durmaz, who assumed command after previously serving as the Istanbul Central Commander. Official regional command tour coverages from the last 24 months report the corps commander conducting joint security infrastructure reviews and operational briefings alongside the leadership of three components: the 6th Border Brigade (6'ncı Hudut Tugayı) during frontier inspections, the 10th Commando Brigade (10'uncu Komando Tugayı) in Tatvan, and the 49th Commando Brigade at Bingöl. The 4th Commando Brigade in Tunceli and the 51st Commando Brigade (51'inci Komando Tugayı) in Hozat are also part of the corps. Also reported is the 108th Artillery Regiment, at General Oğuz Turan Kışlası in Erciş, Van.
