= Abu Nseir area =

Abu Nseir أبو نصير
- Area
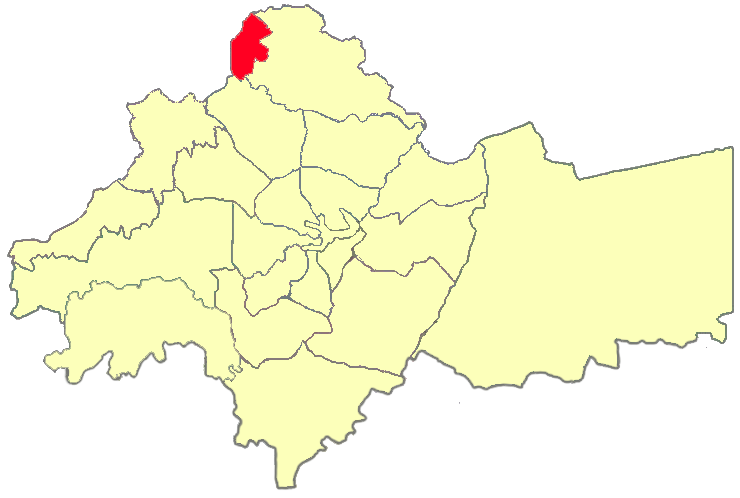
- Country: Jordan
- Governorate: Amman
- Time zone: GMT +2
  - Summer (DST): +3

Abu Nseir is one of the areas of the Greater Amman Municipality, Jordan.
