= USS Arcturus =

USS Arcturus may refer to the following ships of the United States Navy:

- USS Arcturus (SP-182), was a wooden-hulled yacht built in 1911
- USS Arcturus (SP-593), renamed Arcturus on 20 February 1918, probably to avoid confusion with the Army transport Artemis
- USS Arcturus (AK-12), was renamed USS Gold Star (AK-12)
- USS Arcturus (AK-18), was laid down on 26 July 1938 under a Maritime Commission contract
- USS Arcturus (AF-52), was laid down on 8 December 1941 at Oakland, California
