= Osman Erbaş =

Turkish Army general (1962–2021)

- Born: 1962; Yerköy district, Yozgat Province, Turkey
- Died: 4 March 2021 (aged 58); Bitlis province, Turkey
- Military career
- Allegiance: Turkey
- Branch: Turkish Land Forces
- Service years: 1982–2021
- Rank: Lieutenant General
- Commands: 1st Mechanized Infantry Brigade (2010–2012); 6th Mechanized Infantry Division (2015–2016); 8th Corps (2017–2021)
- Conflicts: Kurdish–Turkish conflict; 2016 Turkish coup d'état attempt

Lieutenant General Osman Erbaş (20 March 1962 – 4 March 2021) was a Turkish army officer. He was a keen proponent of the use of unmanned aerial vehicles by the Turkish Army in anti-terrorism operations. In 2015 he was appointed commander of the 6th Mechanized Infantry Division and ordered his officers to remain loyal during the 15 July 2016 Turkish coup d'état attempt. Erbaş later testified as a witness at the trial of soldiers accused of joining the coup attempt. In 2017 he was appointed to command 8th Corps and while serving in this role was killed in a helicopter crash in 2021.

== Early career ==
Osman Erbaş was born in Saray village in the Yerköy district of Yozgat Province, Turkey on 20 March 1962. He was the only son in his family and left his home at the age of 17. Erbaş graduated from the Turkish Military Academy (Kara Harp Okulu) in 1983, the Army War College (Kara Harp Akademisi) in 1997 and the Armed Forces College (Silahlı Kuvvetler Akademisi) in 2000.

== As a general officer ==
In 2008, Erbaş was promoted to the rank of brigadier general and was appointed to a role in the Ministry of National Defense's inspection department. In 2010, he was appointed commander of the 1st Mechanized Infantry Brigade. Erbaş was a keen proponent of unmanned aerial vehicles and brought in comprehensive training in their use in anti-terrorism operations for the men in his brigade. In 2012, he was promoted to major general and appointed head of army intelligence.

In 2015, Erbaş was appointed commander of the 6th Mechanized Infantry Division (the former 6th Corps (Turkey)). He was in this role during the 15 July 2016 Turkish coup d'état attempt and gave orders to his subordinates to resist the attempt. He afterwards attended ceremonies for those men of the security services who were killed in the coup attempt, stating that their killers "are not soldiers", but "murderers". Erbaş was a witness in the March 2017 trial of 35 former soldiers of the 106th Artillery Regiment who were accused of participating in the coup.

Erbaş was promoted to lieutenant general in 2016 and appointed commander of 8th Corps in 2017. He was involved in operations against the Gülen movement which Turkey has designated as an Islamist terrorist organisation (FETO).

== Death ==
Erbaş was one of 11 military personnel killed in a military helicopter crash on 4 March 2021 in Bitlis. Erbaş was among five men who were taken to Tatvan State Hospital with injuries, but he and two others died there. Erbaş is buried in Cebeci Military Cemetery. Erbaş was married with two children.

Military offices
Preceded by Yılmaz Uyar	Commander of the Turkish 8th Corps Command; 2017-2021	Succeeded by -
