= Dongshi, Chiayi =

Rural township in Chiayi County, Taiwan

Coordinates: 23°28′29.2″N 120°10′36.7″E

Dongshi Township 東石鄉 Dongshih
- Rural township
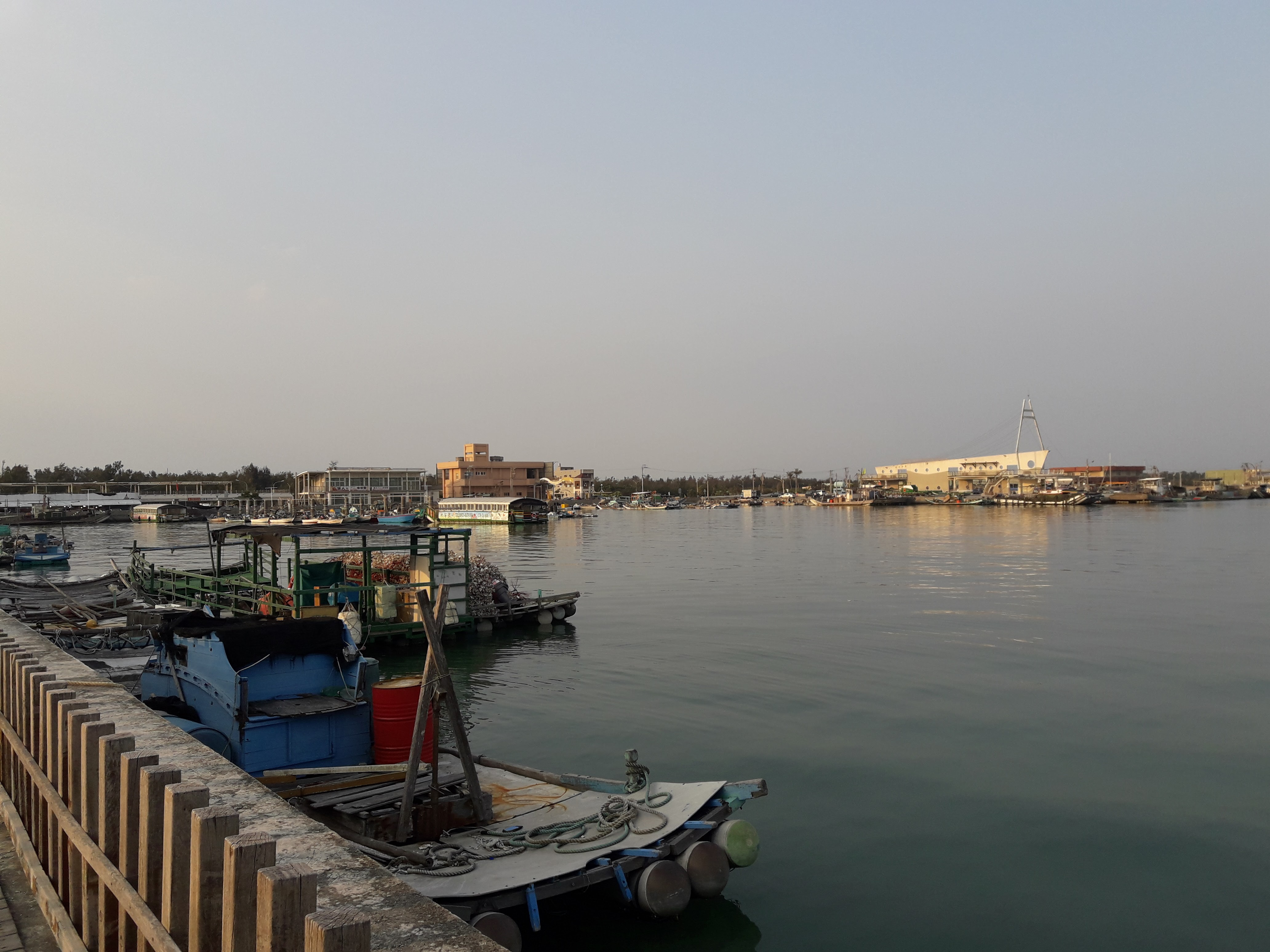
- Dongshi Harbor

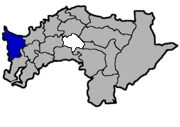
- Dongshi Township in Chiayi County
- Location: Chiayi County, Taiwan

Area
  - Water: 82 km^{2} (32 sq mi)

Population (May 2022)
  - Total: 23,327

Dongshi Township, also Dongshih Township, (Chinese: 東石鄉; Hanyu Pinyin: Dōngshí Xiāng; Tongyong Pinyin: Dongshíh Siang) is a rural township in Chiayi County, Taiwan.

== History ==
After WWII, Dongshi Township was under the jurisdiction of Tainan County. In 1950, it was put under the jurisdiction of Chiayi County .

== Geography ==
It has a population total of 23,327 and an area of 81.5821 km^{2}. Its coastline is 14 km in total length.

== Administrative divisions ==
Tungshi, Yuanshu, Xingcuo, Wengang, Sanjia, Yongtun, Haipu, Longgang, Pilai, Xiayi, Dingyi, Xixia, Gangkou, Aogu, Gangqi, Niaosong, Weitan, Zhouzi, Tunglun, Xilun, Wenzi, Wangliao and Zhangtan Village.

== Tourist attractions ==
- Aogu Wetland
- Dongshi Fisherman's Wharf
- Dongshi Natural Ecological Exhibition Center
- Dongshih Lake
- Gangkou Temple
- Lusih Forest
- Waisanding Offshore Sandbar

== Transportation ==
The township is connected to Shuishang Township through Provincial Highway 82.

== Notable natives ==
- Hsiao Teng-tzang, Minister of Justice (1988-1989)
- Huang Min-hui, Mayor of Chiayi City
- FanFan, Taiwanese singer

== Climate ==
Climate data for Dongshi, Chiayi (2016–2023 normals, extremes 2016–present)
Month	Jan	Feb	Mar	Apr	May	Jun	Jul	Aug	Sep	Oct	Nov	Dec	Year
Record high °C (°F)	28.5 (83.3)	30.3 (86.5)	29.4 (84.9)	30.8 (87.4)	33.7 (92.7)	33.8 (92.8)	34.8 (94.6)	33.7 (92.7)	33.1 (91.6)	33.6 (92.5)	31.2 (88.2)	29.0 (84.2)	34.8 (94.6)
Mean daily maximum °C (°F)	20.3 (68.5)	20.8 (69.4)	23.8 (74.8)	26.6 (79.9)	29.4 (84.9)	31.4 (88.5)	32.0 (89.6)	31.4 (88.5)	31.0 (87.8)	28.8 (83.8)	25.9 (78.6)	22.0 (71.6)	27.0 (80.5)
Daily mean °C (°F)	17.1 (62.8)	17.3 (63.1)	20.3 (68.5)	23.6 (74.5)	26.7 (80.1)	28.8 (83.8)	29.4 (84.9)	28.8 (83.8)	28.2 (82.8)	25.7 (78.3)	22.8 (73.0)	18.9 (66.0)	24.0 (75.1)
Mean daily minimum °C (°F)	14.9 (58.8)	15.0 (59.0)	17.5 (63.5)	21.0 (69.8)	24.5 (76.1)	26.4 (79.5)	27.0 (80.6)	26.6 (79.9)	26.0 (78.8)	23.3 (73.9)	20.5 (68.9)	16.6 (61.9)	21.6 (70.9)
Record low °C (°F)	4.9 (40.8)	8.4 (47.1)	10.7 (51.3)	12.9 (55.2)	16.4 (61.5)	23.3 (73.9)	22.8 (73.0)	23.2 (73.8)	21.7 (71.1)	16.5 (61.7)	13.1 (55.6)	8.8 (47.8)	4.9 (40.8)
Average precipitation mm (inches)	31.6 (1.24)	20.1 (0.79)	55.3 (2.18)	82.9 (3.26)	148.9 (5.86)	250.5 (9.86)	179.9 (7.08)	316.4 (12.46)	112.1 (4.41)	18.1 (0.71)	12.8 (0.50)	32.1 (1.26)	1,261 (49.65)
Average precipitation days	5.2	3.8	6.0	5.3	8.6	12.9	11.7	13.4	7.1	3.4	2.7	3.8	83.9
Average relative humidity (%)	80.7	81.0	80.3	80.1	82.6	82.7	80.9	82.3	79.8	78.3	80.4	77.8	80.6
Source 1: Central Weather Administration
Source 2: Atmospheric Science Research and Application Databank (precipitation days and humidity 2015–2024)
