= Aogu Wetland =

Wetland in Dongshi, Chiayi County, Taiwan

- 鰲鼓濕地 (Chinese)
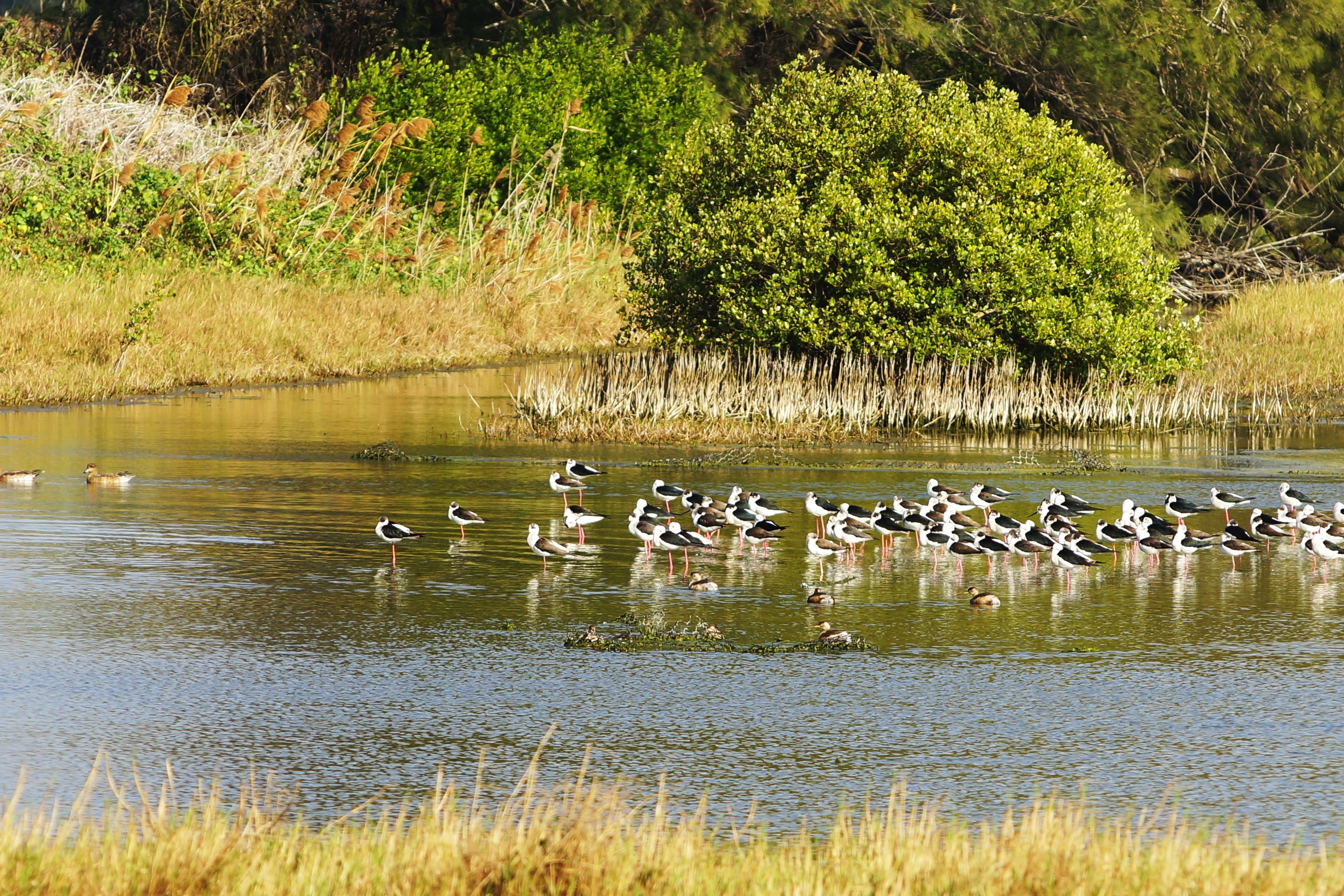

- Location within Chiayi County
- Location: Dongshi, Chiayi County, Taiwan
- Coordinates: 23°30′18.3″N 120°8′14.3″E
- Type: wetland
- Designation: Aogu Wildlife Conservation Sanctuary
- Built: 2009
- Surface area: 1,500 hectares (3,700 acres)

Aogu Wetland (traditional Chinese: 鰲鼓濕地; simplified Chinese: 鳌鼓湿地; pinyin: Áogǔ Shīdì) is a wetland in Dongshi Township, Chiayi County, Taiwan.

== History ==
The wetland used to be a main agricultural land of Taiwan Sugar Corporation for farming, fishing, husbandry and sugarcane plantation. However, due to the continuing subsidence of the area caused by the seawater invading the groundwater, the land became unsuitable for agriculture. As time passes by, the area became a wetland during high tide. In 2009, the wetland was designated as the location for Aogu Wildlife Conservation Sanctuary and oversee by Chiayi County Government.

== Geology ==
The wetland is located at the mouth of Beigang River and Luijiao Drainage Channel. It spands over an area of 1,500 hectares, making it the largest wetland in Taiwan. It features more than 200 species of bird.

== Ecology ==
The habitat of the wetland consists of deep water swamps, dry farmlands, marshes, mudflats, paddy fields and windbreak forest. Terrestrial birds and water birds often fly to this place to find foods. Various species of fish are also found in the fish ponds.

== Transportation ==
The wetland is accessible by bus from Chiayi Station of Taiwan Railway.

== See also ==
- List of tourist attractions in Taiwan
