= Arcturus, Zimbabwe =

Arcturus
- Village
- Location within Zimbabwe
- Coordinates: 17°47′S 31°19′E
- Country: Zimbabwe
- Province: Mashonaland East
- Elevation: 1,385 m (4,544 ft)

Population (1982)
  - Total: 3,300
- estimated
- Time zone: UTC+2 (CAT)

Arcturus is a village in the province of Mashonaland East, Zimbabwe. It is located about 32 km east of Harare. According to the 1982 Population Census, the village had a population of 3,300 and the surrounding rural area has a population of approximately 20,000. The village grew up around and is named after the nearby Arcturus Mine. A number of other small mines also operate in the area. The surrounding area is otherwise principally agricultural, producing a wide variety of crops.

The mine, which was one of the leading and oldest gold producers in Zimbabwe, was established in 1891 and started operations in 1907. It is situated on the southern end of the greenstone belt near Harare and originally comprised three individual mines named Arcturus, Slate and Planet, with separate shafts which were later linked together underground to create a single complex. It closed down in 1924 but was reopened in 1945 under a new owner. It is linked to the Harare–Mutare railway line, 16 km away, by a narrow gauge railway line constructed in 1920. To date, it has produced 1.2 million ounces of gold.

29 workers were killed in the mine in a dynamite explosion on 17 January 1913. On 31 January 1978 the mine was the scene of a serious environmental accident when a dam containing liquefied gold tailings overflowed, causing a breach 55 m wide. It resulted in over 30,000 tons of tailings flooding the surrounding area, damaging a nearby village and killing one child and injuring another. A public waterway was blocked and adjoining pasture was contaminated.

The mine consists of four distinct operations called Venus, Gladstone, Ceylon and Viceroy. It has suffered badly from Zimbabwe's economic problems and a decline in worldwide demand for gold. As a result, it has been placed in care and maintenance twice in the early 21st century, first between 2009–13 and secondly since early 2016 following a $7 million loss in 2015. Antiquated equipment has meant that it has been unable to operate at full capacity. Its owner, Metallon Gold Corporation, has said that it is considering selling off the mine.

== Climate ==
Arcturus is situated in the wettest part of Mashonaland.

Climate data for Arcturus, 1961–1990 normals
Month	Jan	Feb	Mar	Apr	May	Jun	Jul	Aug	Sep	Oct	Nov	Dec	Year
Average precipitation mm (inches)	228.2 (8.98)	205.9 (8.11)	115.0 (4.53)	46.6 (1.83)	8.4 (0.33)	3.6 (0.14)	2.3 (0.09)	2.2 (0.09)	6.0 (0.24)	38.0 (1.50)	103.2 (4.06)	206.1 (8.11)	966 (38.0)
Source: WMO
