= Legislative Yuan constituencies in Chiayi County =

Constituencies in Chiayi County, Taiwan

Chiayi County
- 2 Single-member constituency for the Legislative Yuan
- District(s): Chiayi County
- Electorate: 417,204 (2024 election)

Current constituency
- Created: 2008
- Number of members: 2

Chiayi's legislative districts (Chinese: 嘉義縣選舉區) consist of 2 single-member constituencies, each represented by a member of the Republic of China Legislative Yuan.

== Current districts ==
- Chiayi County Constituency 1 - Lioujiao, Dongshi, Puzi, Budai, Yizhu, Lucao, Shuishang Townships, Taibao City
- Chiayi County Constituency 2 - Xikou, Dalin, Meishan, Xingang, Chaozhou, Zhuqi, Zhongpu, Fanlu, Alishan, Dapu Townships
Chiayi County Constituency 1

Chiayi County Constituency 2

== Legislators ==
Kuomintang Democratic Progressive Party

Election	Chiayi County 1	Chiayi County 2
2008 7th	Wong Chung-chun	Helen Chang (2008-2009)^{1}
2009 by-election	Wong Chung-chun	Chen Ming-Wen
2012 8th	Wong Chung-chun	Chen Ming-Wen
2016 9th	Tsai Yi-yu	Chen Ming-Wen
2020 10th	Tsai Yi-yu	Chen Ming-Wen
2024 11th	Tsai Yi-yu	Chen Kuan-ting

Helen Chang resigned in 2009 after elected Chiayi County magistrate.
