= Jeff Wu =

Taiwanese politician

Wu Fang-ming
- 吳芳銘
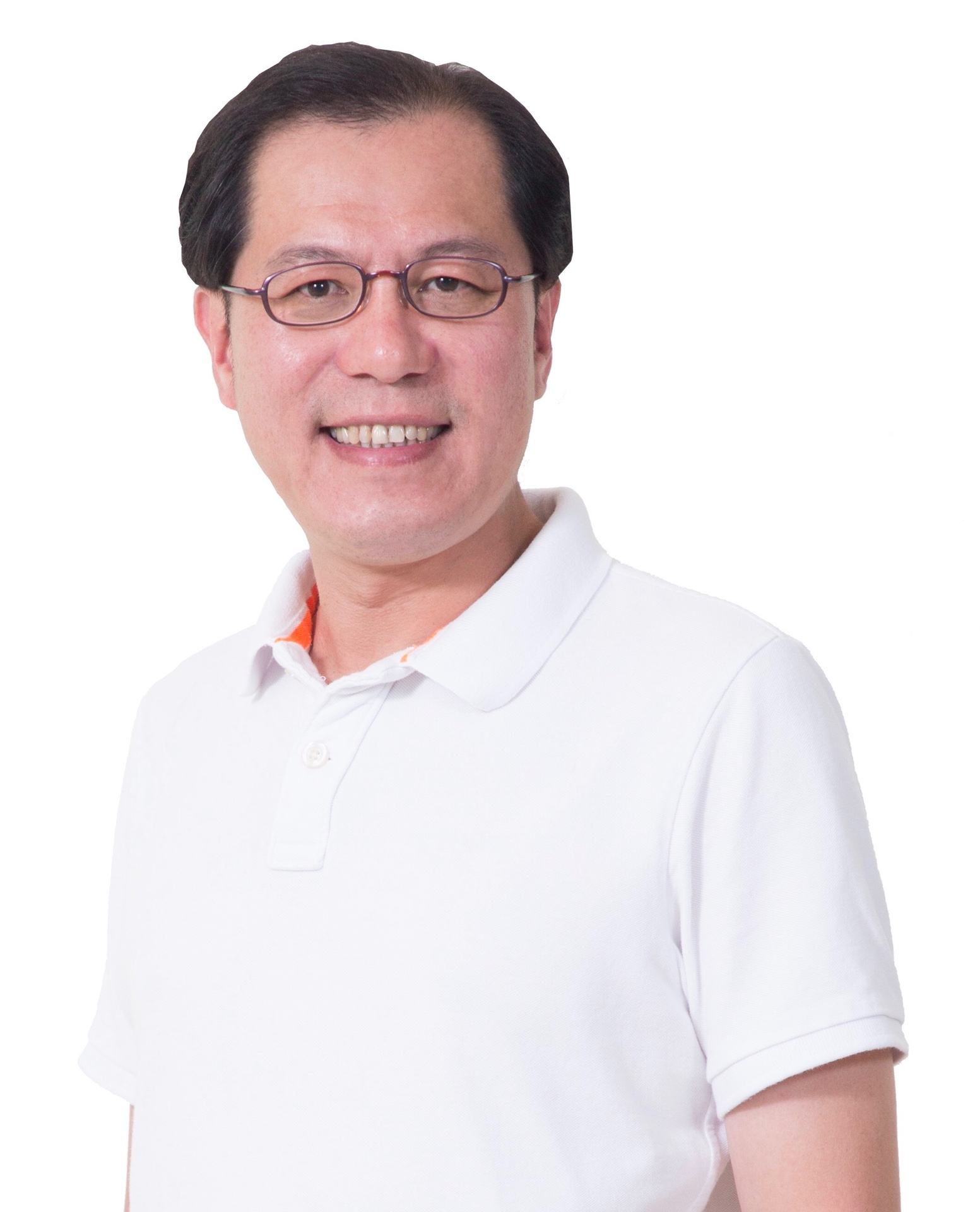
- Official portrait, 2018

7th General Manager of the Taipei Agricultural Products Marketing Corporation
- Incumbent
- Assumed office 30 June 2023
- Mayor: Chiang Wan-an
- Chairman: Yang Cheng-wu
- Preceded by: Weng Chen-chi

Director of the Department of Agriculture
- In office 4 January 2021 – 16 March 2022
- Magistrate: Chang Li-shan
- Succeeded by: Wei Shen-te

Director of the Agriculture Bureau
- In office 25 December 2018 – 12 June 2020
- Mayor: Han Kuo-yu
- Preceded by: Cheng Ching-fu
- Succeeded by: Wang Cheng-i (acting)

Deputy Magistrate of Chiayi
- In office 1 February 2016 – 11 October 2018
- Magistrate: Helen Chang
- Succeeded by: Lee Ming-yue

Personal details
- Born: March 14, 1971 (age 55) Yunlin County, Taiwan
- Party: Independent (after 2018); Democratic Progressive Party (before 2018)
- Education: Tunghai University (BA); National Chung Cheng University (MA); National Chengchi University (MBA); Fudan University (DBA); Tsinghua University (PhD)

Jeff Wu Fang-ming (Chinese: 吳芳銘; born 14 March 1971) is a Taiwanese economist and politician. He served as the general manager of the Taipei Agricultural Products Marketing Corporation since June 2023.

== Education ==
After graduating from Tunghai University with a bachelor's degree in political science, Wu earned a master's degree in political science from National Chung Cheng University and a Master of Business Administration (M.B.A.) from National Chengchi University. He later earned a Doctor of Business Administration (D.B.A.) from Fudan University and earned his Ph.D. in economics from Tsinghua University in China.

== Political career ==
Before serving in the government, he had served several roles in the Democratic Progressive Party. Including deputy director of the Department of Youth Development, and deputy director of the Office of the Chairperson.

Between 2009 and 2018, he served as the director of the Office of the Magistrate, director of the Bureau of Culture, director of Civil Affairs Department, and deputy magistrate of the Chiayi County Government leading by Helen Chang.

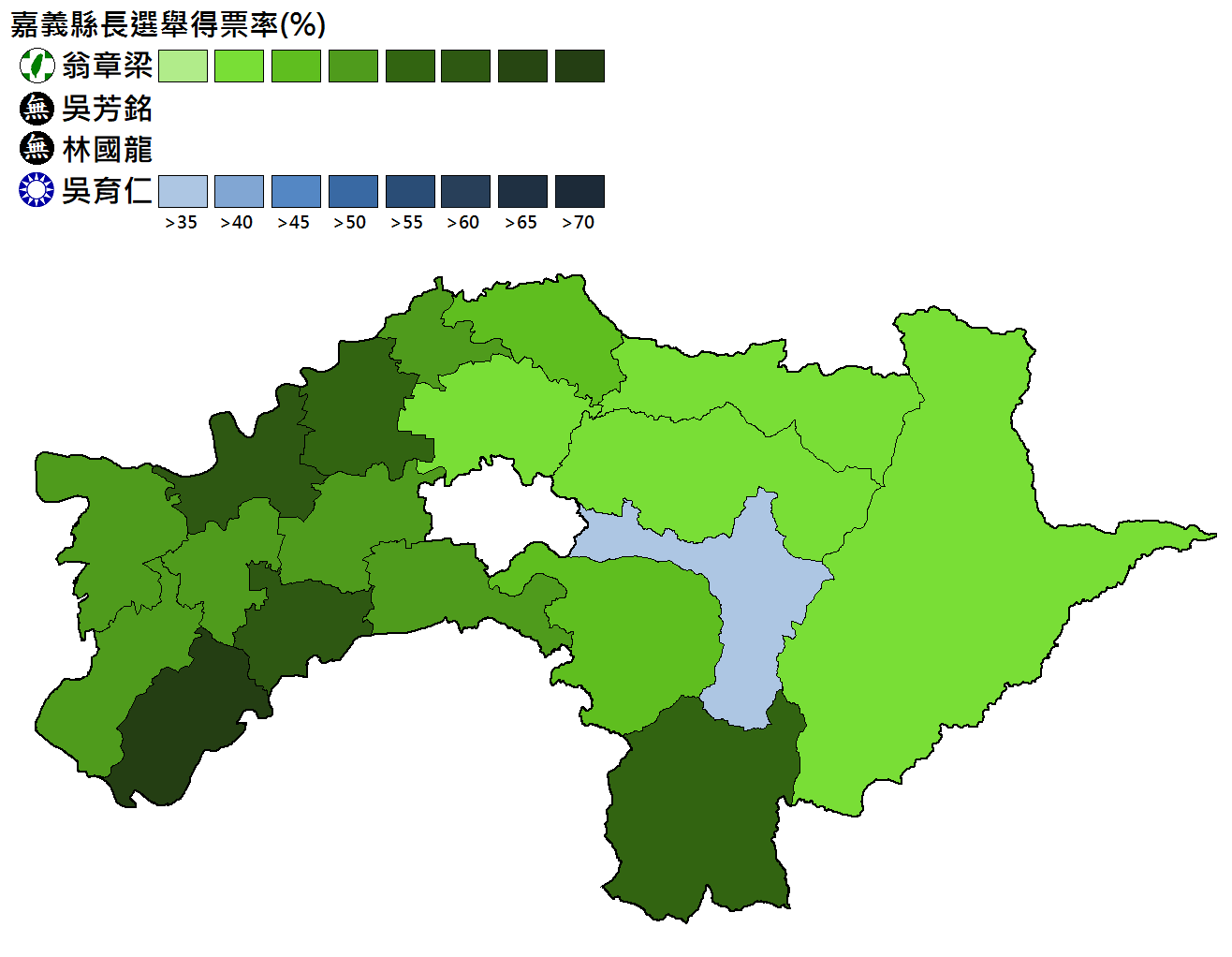
Vote distribution in the 2018 Chiayi County magistrate election

In 2018, he announces his candidacy for magistrate of Chiayi County as an independent politician, but lost to the DPP candidate Weng Chang-liang by 17.89% of vote.

After losing the election, the elected mayor of Kaohsiung Han Kuo-yu invited him to join the Kaohsiung City Government cabinet as the Agriculture Bureau director. He was removed from office following the dismissal of city government cabinet after the 2020 Kaohsiung mayoral recall vote.

Between 2020 and 2021, he serves director of the Department of Agriculture of the Yunlin County Government.

In 2023, he was appointed by Yang Cheng-wu, the board chairman that is a member represented the Taipei City Government in the board council of the Taipei Agricultural Products Marketing Corporation, as the general manager after the board election in June. Recommended by the former mayor of Kaohsiung, Han Kuo-yu.
