= Wong Chung-chun =

Taiwanese politician

Wong Chung-chun MLY
- 翁重鈞
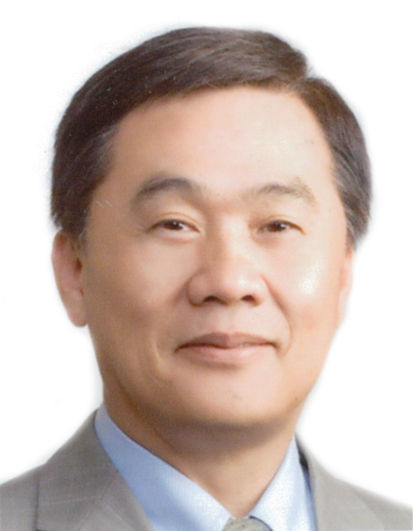

Member of the Legislative Yuan
- Incumbent
- Assumed office 1 February 2020
- Constituency: Republic of China
- In office 1 February 2008 – 31 January 2016
- Succeeded by: Tsai Yi-yu
- Constituency: Chiayi County 1
- In office 1 February 2005 – 31 January 2008
- Constituency: Chiayi County
- In office 1 February 1999 – 31 January 2002
- Constituency: Republic of China
- In office 1 February 1990 – 31 January 1999
- Constituency: Chiayi County

Personal details
- Born: 31 May 1955 (age 71) Yizhu, Chiayi County, Taiwan
- Party: Kuomintang
- Education: Chinese Culture University (BA, MA); National Taiwan University (MBA)

Wong Chung-chun (Chinese: 翁重鈞; pinyin: Wēng Zhòngjūn; 31 May 1955) is a Taiwanese politician.

== Education ==
Wong attended high school in Tainan and earned a bachelor's degree in journalism from Chinese Culture University. He obtained a master's degree in international business administration from CCU, then received an EMBA from National Taiwan University. Wong has taught at the Tatung Institute of Technology.

== Political career ==
Wong served two terms on the Chiayi County Council prior to his election to the Legislative Yuan in 1989. He won reelection in 1992 and again in 1995. During the 1995 campaign, Wong became one of the first candidates to receive a patent for his likeness, which he used on many different trinkets. Having won three consecutive elections as a Kuomintang representative of Chiayi County, Wong was placed on the party list for the 1998 elections, which he also won. It was reported in January 2001 that Wong had let his Kuomintang membership lapse, but later that year, he was named Kuomintang candidate for the magistracy of Chiayi County, losing the office to Chen Ming-wen in a three-way race. Entrepreneur Su Hui-chen stated in September 2002 that Wong had helped her bribe legislators in 1998, though Wong denied involvement. He was indicted by the Taipei District Prosecutors' Office in February 2003 and charged with corruption.

Wong returned to the legislature in 2005, and was named a Kuomintang candidate for 2008. Shortly after defeating Democratic Progressive Party candidate Tsai Chi-fang, Wong was elected Economics Committee convenor, alongside Chiu Ching-chun. In March, Kuanshih, Shuishang leader Lai Chun-an was convicted of electoral fraud in support of Wong's campaign. Wong ran in the 2009 Chiayi County magisterial election, and lost to Helen Chang. In his 2012 legislative campaign, Wong made greater use of social media. He defeated Tsai Yi-yu, the son of Tsai Chi-fang, in 2012. He contested the Chiayi County magistracy for the third time in 2014, and again lost to Helen Chang. Wong was ranked fourteenth on the Kuomintang preliminary party list for the 2020 legislative elections. The list was subsequently revised, and Wong's inclusion confirmed.
