= 2026 IIHF World Championship Division II =

Tournament details
- Host countries: United Arab Emirates; Bulgaria
- Venues: 2 (in 2 host cities)
- Dates: 20–26 April (cancelled); 6–12 April
- Teams: 12

The 2026 IIHF World Championship Division II consisted of two international ice hockey tournaments organized by the International Ice Hockey Federation. Divisions II A and II B represented the fourth and the fifth tier of the IIHF Ice Hockey World Championships.

Israel won Group B and Chinese Taipei finished last and got relegated.

== Group A tournament ==
2026 IIHF World Championship Division II A

Tournament details
- Host country: United Arab Emirates
- City: Al Ain
- Venue: 1 (in 1 host city)
- Dates: 20–26 April (cancelled)
- Teams: 6

The Division II Group A tournament was scheduled to be played in Al Ain, United Arab Emirates, from 20 to 26 April 2026. On 18 March 2026, the tournament was postponed due to the 2026 Iran war. On 7 April 2026 it was announced the tournament would not longer be postponed, but was cancelled. As a consequence no team will be demoted from Division I Group B, and no team will be promoted from Division II Group B, in the 2026 tournaments for 2027.

This tournament was to be played under a new format. The teams were divided into two groups of three using the serpentine system. In the group stage, each team from Group A will face all three opponents from Group B, and vice versa. The top two teams from each group will advance to the semifinals, which will be played as A1 vs. A2, and B1 vs. B2.

=== Participants ===
| Team | Qualification |
|---|---|
| Croatia | Placed 6th in Division I B in 2025 and were relegated. |
| Serbia | Placed 2nd in Division II A in 2025. |
| United Arab Emirates | Hosts; placed 3rd in Division II A in 2025. |
| Belgium | Placed 4th in Division II A in 2025. |
| Australia | Placed 5th in Division II A in 2025. |
| Georgia | Placed 1st in Division II B in 2025 and were promoted. |

== Group B tournament ==
2026 IIHF World Championship Division II B

Tournament details
- Host country: Bulgaria
- City: Sofia
- Venue: 1 (in 1 host city)
- Dates: 6–12 April
- Teams: 6

Tournament statistics
- Games played: 15
- Goals scored: 124 (8.27 per game)
- Attendance: 1,664 (111 per game)
- Scoring leader: (Israel) Henadz Malashchanka (12 points)

Official website
- Website

The Division II Group B tournament was played in Sofia, Bulgaria, from 6 to 12 April 2026. Because of the cancellation of the Group A tournament there was no promotion available in this tournament.

=== Participants ===
| Team | Qualification |
|---|---|
| Israel | Placed 6th in Division II A in 2025 and were relegated. |
| Iceland | Placed 2nd in Division II B in 2025. |
| New Zealand | Placed 3rd in Division II B in 2025. |
| Bulgaria | Hosts; placed 4th in Division II B in 2025. |
| Chinese Taipei | Placed 5th in Division II B in 2025. |
| Kyrgyzstan | Placed 1st in Division III A in 2025 and were promoted. |

=== Match officials ===
Four referees and seven linesperson were selected for the tournament.

| Referees | Linesperson |
|---|---|
| (Czech Republic) Luboš Čamra; (Denmark) Andreas Nygaard; (Kazakhstan) Vladislav Zotov; (Slovenia) Boštjan Groznik | (Austria) Daniel Sparer; (Belgium) Maarten Van Den Acker; (Bulgaria) Martin Boyadjiev; (China) Xu Henhao; (Croatia) Krešimir Polašek; (France) Johan Fauvel; (Spain) Luis Estirado |

=== Standings ===
| Pos | Team | Pld | W | OTW | OTL | L | GF | GA | GD | Pts | Relegation |
|---|---|---|---|---|---|---|---|---|---|---|---|
| 1 | Israel | 5 | 3 | 2 | 0 | 0 | 26 | 14 | +12 | 13 | |
| 2 | New Zealand | 5 | 3 | 0 | 1 | 1 | 29 | 20 | +9 | 10 | |
| 3 | Iceland | 5 | 3 | 0 | 0 | 2 | 21 | 18 | +3 | 9 | |
| 4 | Bulgaria (H) | 5 | 2 | 0 | 0 | 3 | 15 | 21 | −6 | 6 | |
| 5 | Kyrgyzstan | 5 | 1 | 0 | 1 | 3 | 16 | 23 | −7 | 4 | |
| 6 | Chinese Taipei | 5 | 1 | 0 | 0 | 4 | 17 | 28 | −11 | 3 | Relegated to the 2027 Division III A |

Source: IIHF
Rules for classification: 1) points; 2) head-to-head points; 3) head-to-head goal difference; 4) head-to-head number of goals scored; 5) result against closest best-ranked team outside tied teams; 6) result against second-best ranked team outside tied teams; 7) seeding before tournament.
(H) Host

=== Results ===
All times are local (UTC+3).

| 6 April 2026; 13:00 | New Zealand | 6–7 OT (0–2, 3–3, 3–1) (OT: 0–1) | Israel | Winter Sports Palace, Sofia; Attendance: 33 |

Game reference

Joel Hasselman
Goalies
Maksim Kaliaev
Referee:
(Kazakhstan) Vladislav Zotov
Linesmen:
(Spain) Luis Estirado
(France) Johan Fauvel

| | 0–1 | 05:12 – H. Malashchanka (Turner, Polozov) (PP) |
| | 0–2 | 08:30 – Levin (K. Malashchanka) (SH) |
| | 0–3 | 20:47 – H. Malashchanka (Turner, K. Malashchanka) (PP) |
| | 0–4 | 21:05 – Khubashvili Levin) |
| Dalmatau (Simon, Devlin) – 21:43 | 1–4 |
| Vesper (Dalmatau) – 27:18 | 2–4 |
| McIntosh (Strayer, Harrison) – 37:49 | 3–4 |
| | 3–5 | 39:44 – Polozov (K. Malashchanka, Spektor) |
| Carey (Amston, Daigle) (PP) – 44:46 | 4–5 |
| Strayer (McIntosh) – 56:29 | 5–5 |
| | 5–6 | 56:35 – Levin (H. Malashchanka) |
| Carey (Dalmatau, Daigle) – 56:54 | 6–6 |
| | 6–7 | 62:31 – Polozov (K. Malashchanka, H. Malashchanka) (PP) |

12 min
Penalties
10 min
35
Shots
40

| 6 April 2026; 16:30 | Iceland | 6–5 (4–1, 0–2, 2–2) | Chinese Taipei | Winter Sports Palace, Sofia; Attendance: 29 |

Game reference

Helgi Ivarsson
Goalies
Hsiao Po-yu
Lee Yi-cheng
Referee:
(Denmark) Andreas Nygaard
Linesmen:
(Bulgaria) Martin Boyadjiev
(Croatia) Krešimir Polašek

| Rúnarsson (Arnarsson) – 03:24 | 1–0 |
| Rúnarsson (Leifsson, Pálsson) – 05:58 | 2–0 |
| Al. Sveinsson (Maack, Arnarsson) (PP) – 08:48 | 3–0 |
| Magnusson (At. Sveinsson, Leifsson) – 11:41 | 4–0 |
| | 4–1 | 18:13 – Yang (Lin Yo., Wen) |
| | 4–2 | 28:36 – Wang |
| | 4–3 | 33:23 – Pan (Lin Yo., Peng M.) (PP) |
| Rúnarsson (Leifsson, Magnusson) – 47:10 | 5–3 |
| Maack (Arnarsson) – 54:10 | 6–3 |
| | 6–4 | 58:16 – Lin J. (Chang) |
| | 6–5 | 59:07 – Lin Yo. (Pan, Yang) |

8 min
Penalties
6 min
26
Shots
31

| 6 April 2026; 20:00 | Kyrgyzstan | 5–3 (2–1, 0–1, 3–1) | Bulgaria | Winter Sports Palace, Sofia; Attendance: 268 |

Game reference

Alexander Petrov
Goalies
Ivan Stoynov
Andrea Karabadjakov
Referee:
(Czech Republic) Luboš Čamra
Linesmen:
(China) Xu Henhao
(Belgium) Maarten Van Den Acker

| Titov (Seifulov) – 02:52 | 1–0 |
| | 1–1 | 06:14 – Hodulov (Tchalyiov) |
| Seifulov (Abdyraev, Titov) – 15:09 | 2–1 |
| | 2–2 | 25:31 – Nakov (Stamenov, Stanimirov) |
| Titov (Seifulov) (PP) – 43:26 | 3–2 |
| | 3–3 | 47:22 – Stanimirov (Dikov, Zaleev) (PP) |
| Sapitov – 48:27 | 4–3 |
| Seifulov – 53:15 | 5–3 |

14 min
Penalties
12 min
37
Shots
22

| 7 April 2026; 13:00 | Iceland | 6–2 (2–1, 3–0, 1–1) | New Zealand | Winter Sports Palace, Sofia; Attendance: 41 |

Game reference

Helgi Ivarsson
Robert Steingrimsson
Goalies
Joel Hasselman
Referee:
(Slovenia) Boštjan Groznik
Linesmen:
(Austria) Daniel Sparer
(China) Xu Henhao

| | 0–1 | 06:44 – Carey (Devlin) |
| Arnarsson (Arason, Hafsteinsson) (PP) – 09:08 | 1–1 |
| Þorsteinsson (Hafsteinsson) – 15:32 | 2–1 |
| Þorsteinsson (Arason) – 22:53 | 3–1 |
| Magnusson (Leifsson, Eggertsson) – 24:41 | 4–1 |
| Rúnarsson (Magnusson, Leifsson) (PP) – 28:46 | 5–1 |
| Þorsteinsson (Björgvinsson) – 41:38 | 6–1 |
| | 6–2 | 49:40 – Amston (Orr, Flight) |

10 min
Penalties
8 min
29
Shots
28

| 7 April 2026; 16:30 | Chinese Taipei | 5–1 (2–0, 2–0, 1–1) | Kyrgyzstan | Winter Sports Palace, Sofia; Attendance: 34 |

Game reference

Hsiao Po-yu
Goalies
Alexander Petrov
Referee:
(Kazakhstan) Vladislav Zotov
Linesmen:
(Spain) Luis Estirado
(Belgium) Maarten Van Den Acker

| Lin Yi. (Liu, Li) – 00:28 | 1–0 |
| Liu (Sang, Lin J.) (SH) – 07:51 | 2–0 |
| Pan (Wen, Lin Yo.) – 32:23 | 3–0 |
| Wen (Pan, Yang) – 37:34 | 4–0 |
| | 4–1 | 40:39 – Titov (Abdyraev, Seifulov) |
| Wang (PP) – 53:53 | 5–1 |

14 min
Penalties
8 min
17
Shots
50

| 7 April 2026; 20:00 | Israel | 4–2 (1–1, 2–0, 1–1) | Bulgaria | Winter Sports Palace, Sofia; Attendance: 267 |

Game reference

Maksim Kaliaev
Goalies
Ivan Stoynov
Filip Vitanov
Referee:
(Denmark) Andreas Nygaard
Linesmen:
(France) Johan Fauvel
(Croatia) Krešimir Polašek

| | 0–1 | 02:04 – Kareev (Blinov) |
| Levin (Spektor) – 18:56 | 1–1 |
| Zitserman (Spektor, Goldshtein) (PP) – 34:28 | 2–1 |
| Spektor (H. Malashchanka, Kazinets) – 39:53 | 3–1 |
| Khubashvili (Charniak, Goldshtein) – 48:08 | 4–1 |
| | 4–2 | 54:34 – Nakov (Stamenov, Hodulov) (PP, EA) |

8 min
Penalties
2 min
26
Shots
39

| 9 April 2026; 13:00 | Israel | 6–1 (3–0, 3–0, 0–1) | Chinese Taipei | Winter Sports Palace, Sofia; Attendance: 35 |

Game reference

Maksim Kaliaev
Goalies
Hsiao Po-yu
Lee Yi-cheng
Referee:
(Czech Republic) Luboš Čamra
Linesmen:
(Croatia) Krešimir Polašek
(Austria) Daniel Sparer

| Khubashvili (Khvoles, Spektor) – 04:58 | 1–0 |
| H. Malashchanka (K. Malashchanka, Charniak) – 11:01 | 2–0 |
| H. Malashchanka (Polozov, K. Malashchanka) – 12:57 | 3–0 |
| Kerner (Zitserman) (SH) – 32:08 | 4–0 |
| Polozov (K. Malashchanka) – 37:26 | 5–0 |
| Khvoles (Turner) – 38:22 | 6–0 |
| | 6–1 | 56:07 – Lin Yo. (Chen K.) |

10 min
Penalties
8 min
28
Shots
35

| 9 April 2026; 16:30 | Iceland | 6–3 (1–0, 2–1, 3–2) | Kyrgyzstan | Winter Sports Palace, Sofia; Attendance: 52 |

Game reference

Helgi Ivarsson
Goalies
Alexander Petrov
Referee:
(Kazakhstan) Vladislav Zotov
Linesmen:
(Bulgaria) Martin Boyadjiev
(Belgium) Maarten van den Acker

| Al. Sveinsson (Arnarsson, Maack) – 16:47 | 1–0 |
| Arnarsson (Al. Sveinsson, Maack) – 27:48 | 2–0 |
| | 2–1 | 34:56 – Isamatov (Mirbekov, Sapitov) |
| Magnusson (Eggertsson, Leifsson) – 38:08 | 3–1 |
| Eggertsson (Arnarsson, Mojzyszek) – 41:33 | 4–1 |
| Jonsson (Björgvinsson, Hafsteinsson) – 42:25 | 5–1 |
| | 5–2 | 55:05 – Seifulov (PP) |
| Maack (Sveinsson, Arnarsson) – 55:48 | 6–2 |
| | 6–3 | 56:05 – Sapitov (Mirbekov, Popov) |

4 min
Penalties
8 min
22
Shots
37

| 9 April 2026; 20:00 | New Zealand | 7–1 (4–0, 2–1, 1–0) | Bulgaria | Winter Sports Palace, Sofia; Attendance: 214 |

Game reference

Joel Hasselman
Goalies
Filip Vitanov
Andrea Karabadjakov
Referee:
(Slovenia) Boštjan Groznik
Linesmen:
(France) Johan Fauvel
(China) Xu Hehao

| McIntosh (Daigle, Amston) (PP) – 07:40 | 1–0 |
| Dalmatau (Devlin, Brown) – 10:48 | 2–0 |
| Carey (Amson, Dalmatau) – 14:45 | 3–0 |
| McIntosh – 16:56 | 4–0 |
| | 4–1 | 22:36 – Stanimirov (Hodulov) |
| Amson (Flight, MacDonald) – 24:07 | 5–1 |
| McIntosh – 24:15 | 6–1 |
| McIntosh (Daigle, Brown) – 51:59 | 7–1 |

10 min
Penalties
12 min
43
Shots
46

| 11 April 2026; 13:00 | Kyrgyzstan | 3–4 OT (1–1, 2–0, 0–2) (OT: 0–1) | Israel | Winter Sports Palace, Sofia; Attendance: 35 |

Game reference

Alexander Petrov
Goalies
Maksim Kaliaev
Referee:
(Slovenia) Boštjan Groznik
Linesmen:
(Croatia) Krešimir Polašek
(China) Xu Henhao

| Titov (Kudashev, Seifulov) – 09:28 | 1–0 |
| | 1–1 | 17:58 – K. Malashchanka (H. Malashchanka) (PP) |
| Abdyraev (PS) – 24:51 | 2–1 |
| Abdyraev (Seifulov, Popov) (SH) – 31:25 | 3–1 |
| | 3–2 | 47:36 – H. Malashchanka (SH) |
| | 3–3 | 51:27 – Polozov (H. Malashchanka, Zitserman) (PP) |
| | 3–4 | 60:50 – Polozov (K. Malashchanka, Spektor) (PP) |

14 min
Penalties
10 min
33
Shots
26

| 11 April 2026; 16:30 | Bulgaria | 3–1 (0–0, 1–0, 2–1) | Iceland | Winter Sports Palace, Sofia; Attendance: 235 |

Game reference

Ivan Stoynov
Goalies
Helgi Ivarsson
Referee:
(Denmark) Andreas Nygaard
Linesmen:
(Spain) Luis Estirado
(Belgium) Maarten Van Den Acker

| Kareev (SH) – 35:20 | 1–0 |
| Blinov (Kareev, Hodulov) (PP) – 40:47 | 2–0 |
| | 2–1 | 57:15 – Al. Sveinsson (Mojzyszek) |
| Tchalyiov (Hodulov) (EN) – 59:47 | 3–1 |

10 min
Penalties
6 min
25
Shots
34

| 11 April 2026; 20:00 | Chinese Taipei | 2–9 (0–4, 2–1, 0–4) | New Zealand | Winter Sports Palace, Sofia; Attendance: 29 |

Game reference

Hsiao Po-yu
Lee Yi-cheng
Goalies
Joel Hasselman
Referee:
(Czech Republic) Luboš Čamra
Linesmen:
(Bulgaria) Martin Boyadjiev
(Austria) Daniel Sparer

| | 0–1 | 04:58 – Carey (Devlin, Blair) |
| | 0–2 | 07:23 – Devlin (Carey, Dalmatau) |
| | 0–3 | 07:55 – Devlin (Carey) |
| | 0–4 | 19:28 – Amston (McIntosh, MacDonald) (EA) |
| Wen (Peng M.) (PP) – 32:54 | 1–4 |
| | 1–5 | 38:10 – MacDonald (Amston) (SH) |
| Pan (Lin Yo., Yang) – 39:59 | 2–5 |
| | 2–6 | 41:57 – McIntosh (Orr, Amston) (EA) |
| | 2–7 | 44:50 – Carey |
| | 2–8 | 46:58 – Flight (Blair) |
| | 2–9 | 57:39 – March (Orr, Amston) |

6 min
Penalties
8 min
31
Shots
27

| 12 April 2026; 13:00 | Israel | 5–2 (2–1, 1–0, 2–1) | Iceland | Winter Sports Palace, Sofia; Attendance: 37 |

Game reference

Maksim Kaliaev
Goalies
Helgi Ivarsson
Referee:
(Czech Republic) Luboš Čamra
Linesmen:
(Bulgaria) Martin Boyadjiev
(Austria) Daniel Sparer

| Kazinets (Zitserman, Spektor) (PP) – 02:53 | 1–0 |
| Khvoles (Goldshtein) – 03:05 | 2–0 |
| | 2–1 | 19:48 – Rúnarsson (Björgvinsson, Leifsson) (PP) |
| Polozov (K. Malashchanka, H. Malashchanka) (PP) – 24:43 | 3–1 |
| H. Malashchanka (Voshilo, Khvoles) – 46:26 | 4–1 |
| | 4–2 | 53:15 – Mojzyszek (Jóhannsson, Kristjánsson) |
| Levin (EN) – 59:13 | 5–2 |

16 min
Penalties
18 min
28
Shots
31

| 12 April 2026; 16:30 | New Zealand | 5–4 (1–3, 4–0, 0–1) | Kyrgyzstan | Winter Sports Palace, Sofia; Attendance: 32 |

Game reference

Alexander Petrov
Goalies
Joel Hasselman
Referee:
(Kazakhstan) Vladislav Zotov
Linesmen:
(Spain) Luis Estirado
(China) Xu Henhao

| | 0–1 | 03:44 – Abdyraev (Popov, Isamatov) |
| | 0–2 | 10:03 – Esenov |
| | 0–3 | 12:07 – Sapitov (Mirbekov, Esenov) |
| Strayer (Daigle, McIntosh) (PP2, EA) – 19:04 | 1–3 |
| Dalmatau (Simon, Devlin) – 27:27 | 2–3 |
| Dalmatau (Carey, McIntosh) – 21:43 | 3–3 |
| Carey (McIntosh, Strayer) – 36:27 | 4–3 |
| Flight (Brown, MacDonald) – 37:36 | 5–3 |
| | 5–4 | 45:52 – Esenov |

6 min
Penalties
10 min
21
Shots
40

| 12 April 2026; 20:00 | Bulgaria | 6–4 (1–0, 4–1, 1–3) | Chinese Taipei | Winter Sports Palace, Sofia; Attendance: 323 |

Game reference

Ivan Stoynov
Goalies
Hsiao Po-yu
Referee:
(Slovenia) Boštjan Groznik
Linesmen:
(France) Johan Fauvel
(Belgium) Maarten Van Den Acker

| Kareev (Blinov) (PP) – 02:11 | 1–0 |
| Blinov (Nakov, Kareev) – 21:18 | 2–0 |
| Kareev (Blinov, Stoilov) – 21:27 | 3–0 |
| Tchalyiov (Hodulov) – 23:55 | 4–0 |
| | 4–1 | 27:20 – Lin Yo. (Wang, Lin Yi.) |
| Nakov (Kareev, Blinov) (PP) – 39:06 | 5–1 |
| | 5–2 | 46:14 – Chen Y. (Lin J., Peng K.) |
| | 5–3 | 52:09 – Lin Yo. (SH) |
| Blinov (Nakov, Kareev) (EN) – 59:28 | 6–3 |
| | 6–4 | 59:48 – Wang (Wu, Chen K.) (EA) |

8 min
Penalties
10 min
32
Shots
47

=== Statistics ===
==== Scoring leaders ====
List shows the top skaters sorted by points, then goals.

| Player | GP | G | A | Pts | +/− | PIM | POS |
|---|---|---|---|---|---|---|---|
| (Israel) Henadz Malashchanka | 5 | 6 | 6 | 12 | +5 | 4 | F |
| (New Zealand) Jacob Carey | 5 | 7 | 4 | 11 | +7 | 0 | F |
| (New Zealand) Colin McIntosh | 5 | 6 | 5 | 11 | +2 | 6 | F |
| (New Zealand) Stefan Amston | 5 | 4 | 6 | 10 | +7 | 0 | D |
| (Israel) Kiryl Malashchanka | 5 | 1 | 9 | 10 | 0 | 4 | F |
| (Israel) Kirill Polozov | 5 | 6 | 2 | 8 | +3 | 2 | F |
| (Bulgaria) Semen Kareev | 5 | 4 | 4 | 8 | −1 | 10 | F |
| (Chinese Taipei) Lin Yo-chen | 5 | 4 | 4 | 8 | +4 | 0 | F |
| (Kyrgyzstan) Mamed Seifulov | 5 | 3 | 5 | 8 | +3 | 2 | F |
| (Iceland) Kári Arnarsson | 5 | 2 | 6 | 8 | +3 | 2 | F |

GP = Games played; G = Goals; A = Assists; Pts = Points; +/− = Plus/Minus; PIM = Penalties in Minutes; POS = Position
Source: IIHF.com

==== Goaltending leaders ====
Only the top five goaltenders, based on save percentage, who have played at least 40% of their team's minutes, are included in this list.

| Player | TOI | GA | GAA | SA | Sv% | SO |
|---|---|---|---|---|---|---|
| (Israel) Maksim Kaliaev | 303:21 | 14 | 2.77 | 173 | 91.91 | 0 |
| (Bulgaria) Ivan Stoynov | 190:24 | 11 | 3.47 | 117 | 90.60 | 0 |
| (Iceland) Helgi Ivarsson | 292:56 | 15 | 3.07 | 144 | 89.58 | 0 |
| (New Zealand) Joel Hasselman | 280:02 | 20 | 4.29 | 177 | 88.70 | 0 |
| (Chinese Taipei) Hsiao Po-yu | 175:41 | 18 | 6.15 | 117 | 84.62 | 0 |

TOI = time on ice (minutes:seconds); SA = shots against; GA = goals against; GAA = goals against average; Sv% = save percentage; SO = shutouts
Source: IIHF.com

=== Awards ===
| Position | Player |
|---|---|
| Goaltender | (Israel) Maksim Kaliaev |
| Defenceman | (New Zealand) Stefan Amston |
| Forward | (New Zealand) Jacob Carey |
