= Weng Chang-liang =

Taiwanese politician

Weng Chang-liang Pasuya Weng
- 翁章梁
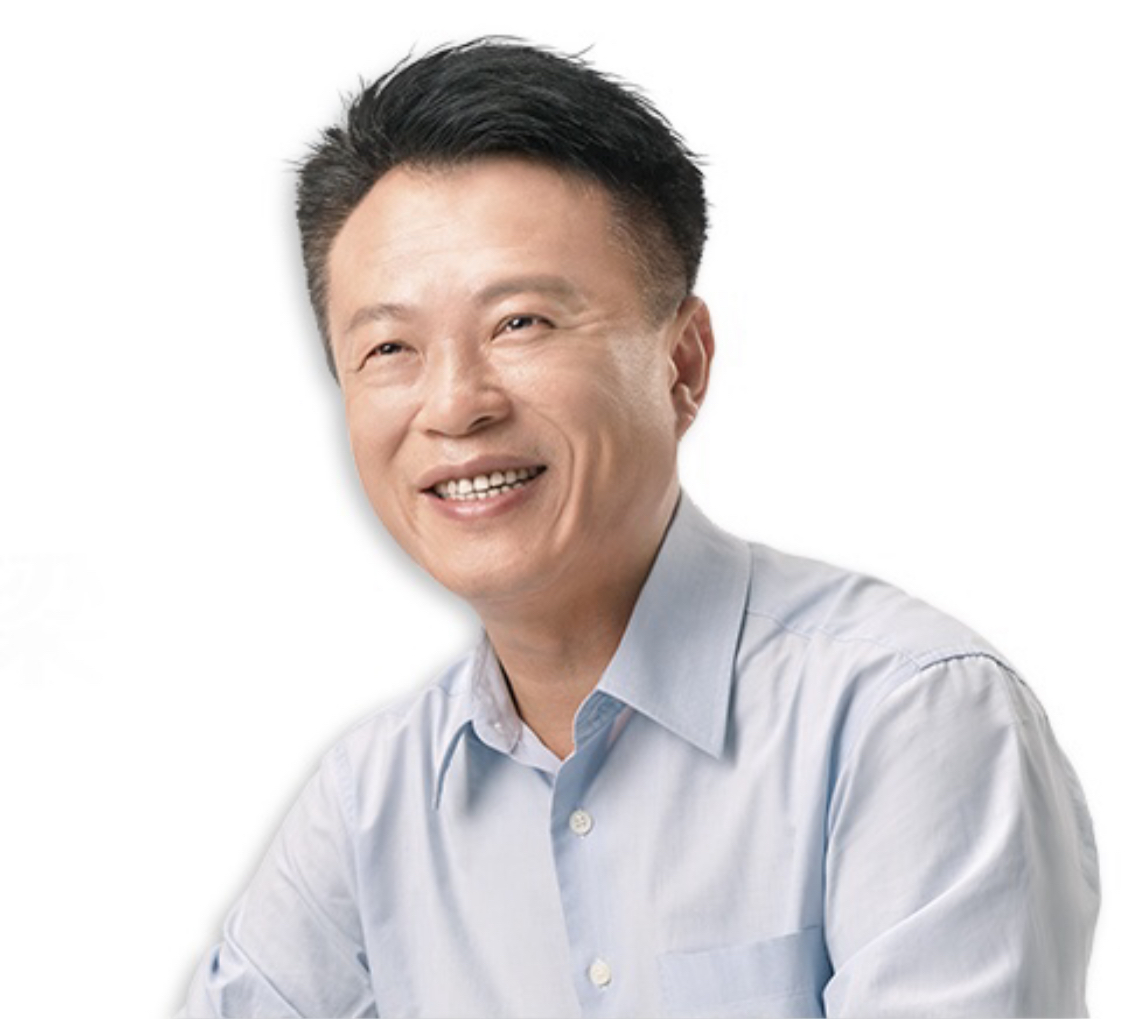
- Official portrait, 2018

13th Magistrate of Chiayi
- Incumbent
- Assumed office 25 December 2018
- Deputy: See list: Wu Jung-hui Liu Pei-tung
- Preceded by: Helen Chang

Deputy Minister of Agriculture
- In office 20 May 2016 – 8 February 2017
- Minister: Tsao Chi-hung

Personal details
- Born: 28 May 1965 (age 60) Yizhu, Chiayi County, Taiwan
- Party: Democratic Progressive Party
- Education: Chung Yuan Christian University (BS); Nanhua University (MA)

Weng Chang-liang (Chinese: 翁章梁; pinyin: Wēng Zhāngliáng; born 28 May 1965) also known as Pasuya Weng, is a Taiwanese politician who is the current magistrate of Chiayi County, serving since 25 December 2018.

== Early life and education ==
Born in Yizhu, Chiayi County, Weng attended Chiayi Senior High School. He graduated from Chung Yuan Christian University with a bachelor's degree in computer science and engineering, then earned a master's degree in management from Nanhua University. He was active in the Wild Lily student movement.

== Political career ==
Weng worked for the Chiayi County Government before he served as deputy minister of Council of Agriculture under Tsao Chi-hung in 2016. Weng left the post and began campaigning to represent the Democratic Progressive Party in the 2018 Chiayi magisterial election, registering for the party primary in January 2018. In March, he defeated Chiayi County Council speaker Chang Ming-ta in the primary.

In the general election, Weng won 51% of the vote to defeat Kuomintang candidate Wu Yu-jen.

2018 Democratic Progressive Party Chiayi County magistrate primary results
Candidates	Place	Focus Survey Research	Shih Shin	Real Survey	Aggregated Result
Weng Chang-liang	Nominated	43.08%	42.88%	45.34%	43.77%
Chang Ming-ta	2nd	35.57%	36.73%	33.79%	35.36%
None of the candidates		21.35%	20.39%	20.87%	20.87%

2018 Chiayi County mayoral results
No.	Candidate	Party	Votes	Percentage
1	Weng Chang-liang	Democratic Progressive Party	145,288	50.95%
2	Wu Fang-ming (吳芳銘)	Independent	51,020	17.89%
3	Lin Kuo-lung (林國龍)	Independent	4,596	1.61%
4	Wu Yu-jen	Kuomintang	84,243	29.54%
Total voters			428,649	
Valid votes			285,147	
Invalid votes				
Voter turnout			66.52%	
