= Chiayi County Constituency 2 =

Constituency of the Legislative Yuan of Taiwan

- Single-member constituency for the Legislative Yuan
- District(s): Dalin, Minxiong, Xikou, Xingang, Zhongpu, Zhuqi, Meishan, Fanlu, Dapu, Alishan
- Electorate: 220,303 (2024 election)

Current constituency
- Created: 2008
- Party: DPP
- Member: Chen Kuan-ting

Chiayi County Constituency 2 (Chinese: 嘉義縣第二選舉區) is one of the 73 regional constituencies represented in the Legislative Yuan, the national legislature of Taiwan. It was created in 2008 following a series of constitutional reforms, and elects one legislator, through first-past-the-post voting, to the Legislative Yuan. It has been represented by Chen Kuan-ting of the Democratic Progressive Party since 2024.

== Legislators ==
Election	Legislator	Party
2008 - 2010	Helen Chang	Democratic Progressive Party
2010 - 2024	Chen Ming-wen	Democratic Progressive Party
2024	Chen Kuan-ting	Democratic Progressive Party

== Election results ==

=== 2008 ===
2008 Taiwanese legislative election: Chiayi County 2
Candidate	Party	Votes	%
Helen Chang	Democratic Progressive Party	65,192	57.05
Tu Wen-sheng	Kuomintang	48,131	42.12
Huang Mao	Great Love Constitutional Reform	940	0.82
Total		114,263	100.00
Valid votes		114,263	98.16
Invalid/blank votes		2,145	1.84
Total votes		116,408	100.00
Registered voters/turnout		219,619	53.00
Majority		17,061	14.93
Democratic Progressive Party win			

=== 2010 ===
Called after incumbent legislator resigned to run for Magistrate of Chiayi County

2010 Legislative Yuan by-election: Chiayi County 2
Candidate	Party	Votes	%	+/–
Chen Ming-wen	Democratic Progressive Party	57,451	67.92	▲10.87
Lin Te-jui	Kuomintang	27,138	32.08	▼10.04
Total		84,589	100.00	–
Valid votes		84,589	99.42	
Invalid/blank votes		490	0.58	
Total votes		85,079	100.00	
Registered voters/turnout		221,816	38.36	
Majority		30,313	35.84	
Democratic Progressive Party hold				

=== 2012 ===
* denotes the incumbent legislator

2012 Taiwanese legislative election: Chiayi County 2
Candidate	Party	Votes	%	+/–
Chen Ming-wen*	Democratic Progressive Party	86,828	55.20	▼12.72
Chen I-chen	Kuomintang	70,477	44.80	▲12.72
Total		157,305	100.00	–
Valid votes		157,305	98.59	
Invalid/blank votes		2,242	1.41	
Total votes		159,547	100.00	
Registered voters/turnout		222,969	71.56	
Majority		16,351	10.4	
Democratic Progressive Party hold				

=== 2016 ===
* denotes the incumbent legislator

2016 Taiwanese legislative election: Chiayi County 2
Candidate	Party	Votes	%	+/–
Chen Ming-wen*	Democratic Progressive Party	88,538	65.18	▲9.98
Lin Yu-ling	Kuomintang	43,279	31.86	▼12.94
Lai Ching-min	Great Love Constitutional Reform	4,016	2.96	NEW
Total		135,833	100.00	–
Valid votes		135,833	96.32	
Invalid/blank votes		5,191	3.68	
Total votes		141,024	100.00	
Registered voters/turnout		223,450	63.11	
Majority		45,259	33.32	
Democratic Progressive Party win				

=== 2020 ===
* denotes the incumbent legislator

2020 Taiwanese legislative election: Chiayi County 2
Candidate	Party	Votes	%	+/–
Chen Ming-wen*	Democratic Progressive Party	72,141	46.14	▼19.04
Lin Kuo-ching	Independent	64,415	41.20	NEW
Hsu Neng-tung	Independent	13,246	8.47	NEW
Hsu Shao-chen	Formosa Alliance	2,681	1.71	NEW
Wang Chin-shan	Taiwan Renewal Party	2,418	1.55	NEW
Chien Ming-lien	Independent	1,443	0.92	NEW
Total		156,344	100.00	–
Valid votes		156,344	96.43	
Invalid/blank votes		5,790	3.57	
Total votes		162,134	100.00	
Registered voters/turnout		222,860	72.75	
Majority		7,726	4.94	
Democratic Progressive Party hold				

=== 2024 ===
2024 Taiwanese legislative election: Chiayi County 2
Candidate	Party	Votes	%	+/–
Chen Kuan-ting	Democratic Progressive Party	73,598	49.50	▲3.36
Lin Kuo-ching	Independent	64,778	43.57	▲2.37
Liao Yu-ching	Independent	6,601	4.44	NEW
Chien Ming-chieh	Institutional Island Saving the World	2,499	1.68	NEW
Huang I-che	Taiwan Renewal Party	1,213	0.82	▼0.73
Total		148,689	100.00	–
Valid votes		148,689	96.12	
Invalid/blank votes		6,006	3.88	
Total votes		154,695	100.00	
Registered voters/turnout		220,303	70.22	
Majority		8,820	5.93	
Democratic Progressive Party hold				
