= Chiayi County Constituency 1 =

Constituency of the Legislative Yuan of Taiwan

- Single-member constituency for the Legislative Yuan
- District(s): Liujiao, Dongshi, Puzi City, Taibao, Budai, Yizhu, Lucao, Shuishang
- Electorate: 196,901 (2024 election)

Current constituency
- Created: 2008
- Party: DPP
- Member: Tsai Yi-yu

Chiayi County Constituency 1 (Chinese: 嘉義縣第一選舉區) is one of the 73 regional constituencies represented in the Legislative Yuan, the national legislature of Taiwan. It was created in 2008 following a series of constitutional reforms, and elects one legislator, through first-past-the-post voting, to the Legislative Yuan. It has been represented by Tsai Yi-yu of the Democratic Progressive Party since 2016.

== Legislators ==
Election	Legislator	Party
2008 - 2016	Wong Chung-chun	Kuomintang
2016	Tsai Yi-yu	Democratic Progressive Party

== Election results ==

=== 2008 ===
2008 Taiwanese legislative election: Chiayi County 1
Candidate	Party	Votes	%
Wong Chung-chun	Kuomintang	75,489	57.47
Tsai Chi-fang	Democratic Progressive Party	55,860	42.53
Total		131,349	100.00
Valid votes		131,349	97.73
Invalid/blank votes		3,048	2.27
Total votes		134,397	100.00
Registered voters/turnout		202,519	66.36
Majority		19,629	14.94
Kuomintang win (new seat)			

=== 2012 ===
* denotes the incumbent legislator

2012 Taiwanese legislative election: Chiayi County 1
Candidate	Party	Votes	%	+/–
Wong Chung-chun*	Kuomintang	73,481	50.31	▼7.16
Tsai Yi-yu	Democratic Progressive Party	72,586	49.69	▲7.16
Total		146,067	100.00	–
Valid votes		146,067	97.50	
Invalid/blank votes		3,745	2.50	
Total votes		149,812	100.00	
Registered voters/turnout		202,958	73.81	
Majority		895	0.62	
Kuomintang hold				

=== 2016 ===
2016 Taiwanese legislative election: Chiayi County 1
Candidate	Party	Votes	%	+/–
Tsai Yi-yu	Democratic Progressive Party	72,469	52.96	▲3.27
Lin Chiang-chuan	Kuomintang	62,176	45.44	▼4.87
Chiu Kun-lung	Independent	2,186	1.60	NEW
Total		136,831	100.00	–
Valid votes		136,831	97.77	
Invalid/blank votes		3,121	2.23	
Total votes		139,952	100.00	
Registered voters/turnout		201,665	69.40	
Majority		10,293	7.52	
Democratic Progressive Party gain from Kuomintang				

=== 2020 ===
* denotes the incumbent legislator

2020 Taiwanese legislative election: Chiayi County 1
Candidate	Party	Votes	%	+/–
Tsai Yi-yu*	Democratic Progressive Party	81,028	57.55	▲4.59
Wang Chi-li	Kuomintang	56,256	39.96	▼5.48
Huang I-hsuan	Chinese Unification Promotion Party	2,175	1.54	NEW
Huang Chun-hsiung	Formosa Alliance	1,336	0.95	NEW
Total		140,795	100.00	–
Valid votes		140,795	97.12	
Invalid/blank votes		4,176	2.88	
Total votes		144,971	100.00	
Registered voters/turnout		199,857	72.54	
Majority		24,772	17.59	
Democratic Progressive Party hold				

=== 2024 ===
* denotes the incumbent legislator

2024 Taiwanese legislative election: Chiayi County 1
Candidate	Party	Votes	%	+/–
Tsai Yu-yi*	Democratic Progressive Party	78,551	59.22	▲1.67
Chan Wan-chen	Kuomintang	54,097	40.78	▲0.82
Total		132,648	100.00	–
Valid votes		132,648	97.13	
Invalid/blank votes		3,920	2.87	
Total votes		136,568	100.00	
Registered voters/turnout		196,901	69.36	
Majority		24,454	18.44	
Democratic Progressive Party hold				
