= Chen Shih-yung =

Taiwanese politician (1948–2022)

- 陳適庸
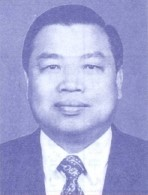

County Magistrate of Chiayi
- In office 20 September 1989 – 25 December 1993
- Preceded by: Ho Chia-jung
- Succeeded by: Li Ya-ching

Personal details
- Born: 12 September 1948 Lucao, Taiwan Province, China
- Died: 7 February 2022 (aged 73) Chiayi County, Taiwan
- Party: People First Party
- Other political affiliations: Kuomintang
- Education: National Taiwan University (LLB, LLM); Harvard University (SJD)

Chen Shih-yung (Chinese: 陳適庸; 12 September 1948 – 7 February 2022) was a Taiwanese politician and lawyer.

Before entering politics, Chen graduated from National Taiwan University with his bachelor's degree and master's degree in law and earned his doctorate in law from Harvard University. As a member of the Kuomintang, he served as County Magistrate of Chiayi from 1989 to 1993, and later joined the People First Party. He died in Chiayi County on 7 February 2022, at the age 73.
