= Wu Yu-jen =

Taiwanese Kuomintang politician (born 1969)

- 吳育仁
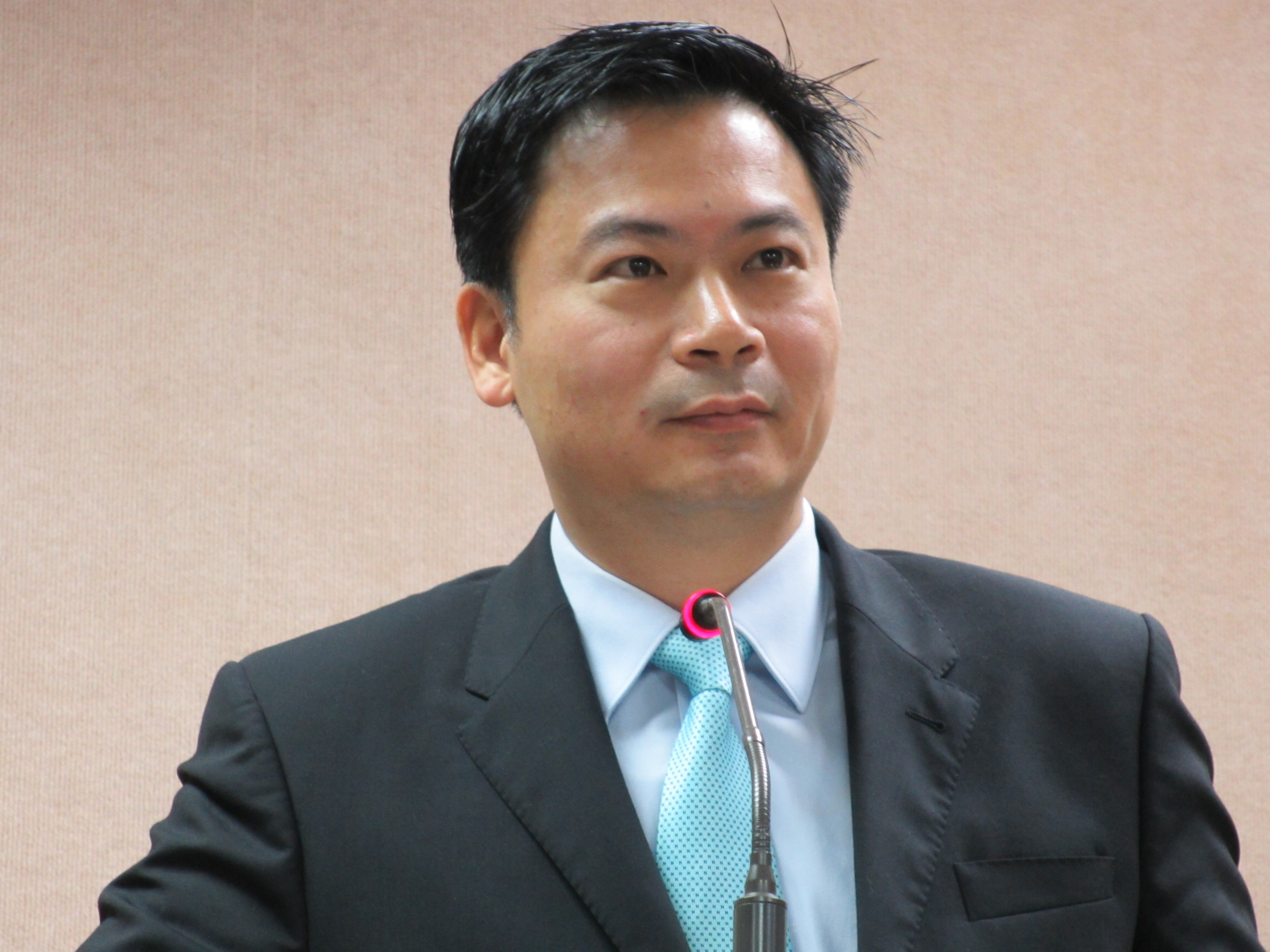

Member of Legislative Yuan
- In office 1 February 2012 – 31 January 2016

Personal details
- Born: 5 February 1969 (age 57) Yunlin, Taiwan
- Party: Kuomintang

Wu Yu-jen (Chinese: 吳育仁; pinyin: Wú Yùrén; Wade–Giles: Wu Yü-jen; born 5 February 1969) is a member of the Kuomintang party who was in the Legislative Yuan in Taiwan.

== Political careers ==
2018 Kuomintang Chiayi County magistrate primary results
| Candidates | Place | Result |
|---|---|---|
| Wu Yu-jen | Called In | Walkover |

2018 Chiayi County mayoral results
| No. | Candidate | Party | Votes | Percentage |
|---|---|---|---|---|
| 1 | Weng Chang-liang | Democratic Progressive Party | 145,288 | 50.95% |
| 2 | Wu Fang-ming (吳芳銘) | Independent | 51,020 | 17.89% |
| 3 | Lin Kuo-lung (林國龍) | Independent | 4,596 | 1.61% |
| 4 | Wu Yu-jen | Kuomintang | 84,243 | 29.54% |
| Total voters | | | 428,649 | |
| Valid votes | | | 285,147 | |
| Invalid votes | | | | |
| Voter turnout | | | 66.52% | |

== See also ==
- List of members of the eighth Legislative Yuan
