= Chen Kuan-ting =

Taiwanese politician

- 陳冠廷
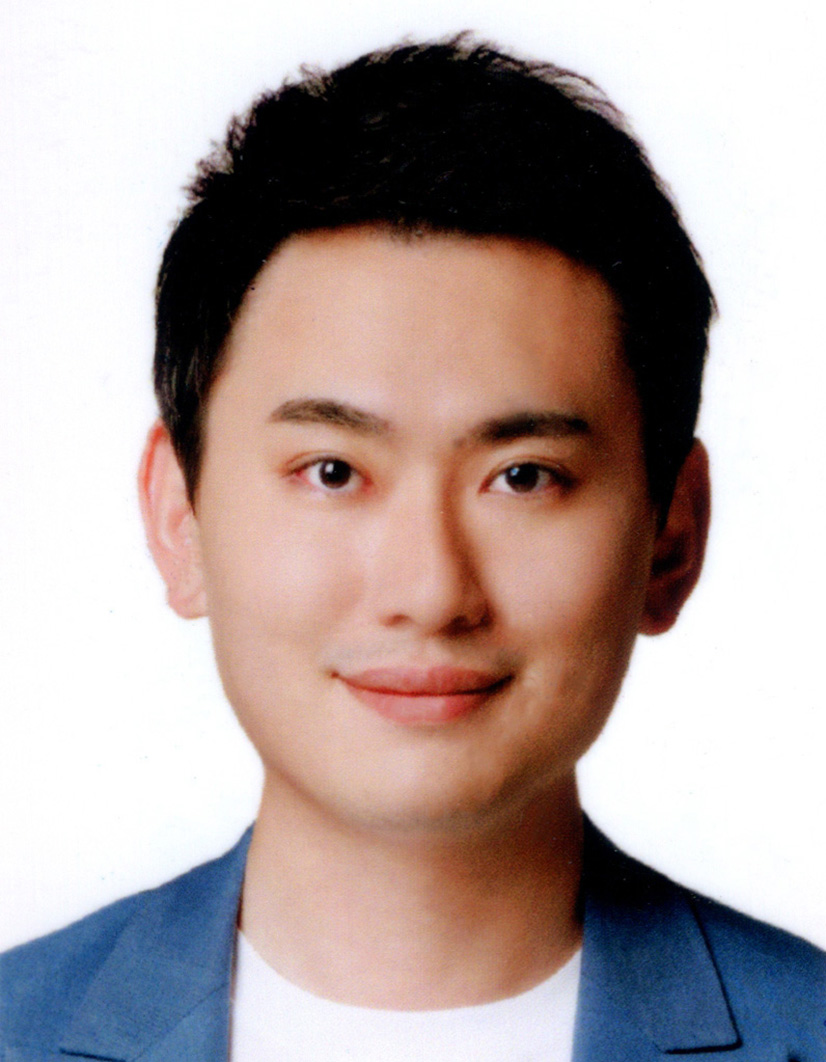
- Official portrait, 2024

Member of the Legislative Yuan
- Incumbent
- Assumed office 1 February 2024
- Preceded by: Chen Ming-wen
- Constituency: Chiayi County 2

Director of the DPP Youth Bureau
- Incumbent
- Assumed office 1 April 2025
- Chairman: Lai Ching-te

Personal details
- Born: April 5, 1986 (age 40) Chiayi City, Taiwan
- Party: Democratic Progressive Party
- Spouse: Saruta Chisato (m. 2016)
- Education: University of Wisconsin–Madison (BA); University of Tokyo (MA)
- Website: www.kuantingvision.com

Chen Kuan-ting (Chinese: 陳冠廷; pinyin: Chén Guàntíng; born 5 April 1986) is a Taiwanese politician who has served as a member of the 11th Legislative Yuan representing Chiayi County's 2nd electoral district since 2024. He is a member of the Democratic Progressive Party (DPP). In April 2025, he was appointed the inaugural director of the DPP Youth Bureau.

== Early life and education ==
Chen was born in Chiayi in 1986, the son of DPP politician Chen Ming-wen. After attending Chiayi County Private Concordia High School, he graduated from the University of Wisconsin–Madison with a bachelor's degree and later earned a master's degree in public policy from the University of Tokyo.

== Career before politics ==
Before entering elected office, Chen worked as an assistant consultant at the Nomura Research Institute in Tokyo and in business development roles.

== Political career ==
=== Early career ===
Chen served as a staff associate at the National Security Council from 2016 to 2017.In December 2018, he was appointed a deputy spokesperson for the Taipei City Government; the city government's announcement said he would assist Mayor Ko Wen-je with policy-related research and planning. From 2020 to 2022 he was a special assistant to President Tsai Ing-wen.In 2023, he served as an administrative advisor to the Executive Yuan.

=== Legislative career ===
Chen was elected to the Legislative Yuan in the 2024 Taiwanese legislative election, receiving 73,598 votes (49.50%) in Chiayi County's 2nd electoral district.

In October 2026, Chen was appointed deputy secretary-general of the Democratic Progressive Party caucus in the Legislative Yuan.

=== Positions within DPP ===
In April 2025, Chen was appointed the inaugural director of the Democratic Progressive Party (DPP) Youth Bureau. In October 2025, he led a Youth Bureau delegation to Japan for meetings with multiple Japanese political parties, according to a statement by the DPP.

In July 2026, Chen was elected to the DPP’s 22nd Central Executive Committee.
