= Yizhu, Chiayi =

Rural township in Chiayi County, Taiwan

Coordinates: 23.356549°N 120.223511°E

Yizhu Township 義竹鄉 Yijhu
- Rural township
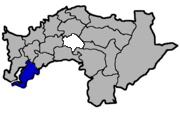
- Yizhu Township in Chiayi County
- Location: Chiayi County, Taiwan

Area
  - Total: 79 km^{2} (31 sq mi)

Population (May 2022)
  - Total: 17,104
  - Density: 220/km^{2} (560/sq mi)

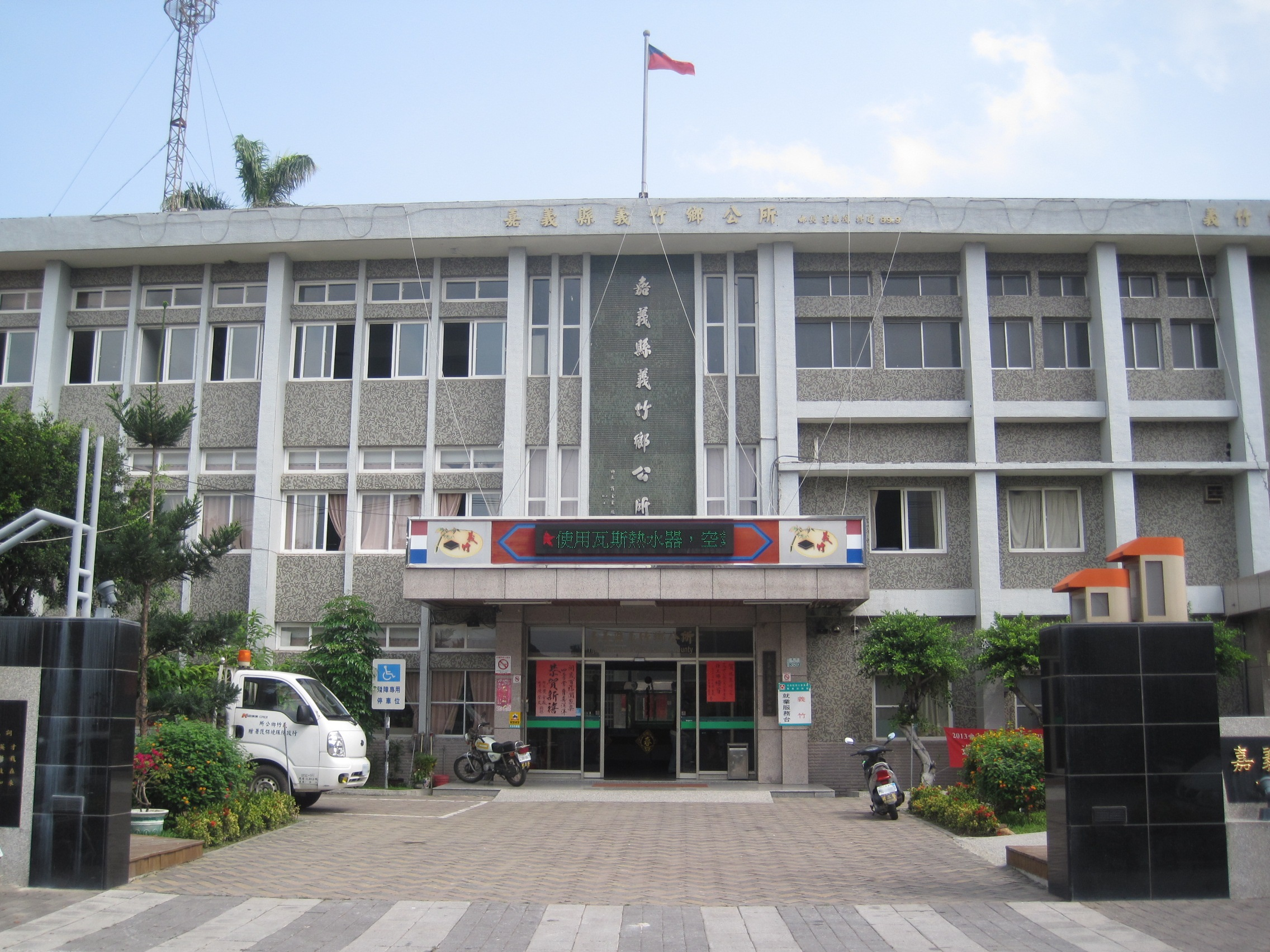
Yizhu Township Office

Yizhu Township or Yijhu Township (Chinese: 義竹鄉; pinyin: Yìzhú Xiāng) is a rural township in Chiayi County, Taiwan.

== Geography ==
It has a population of 17,104 and an area of 79.3 kilometres (49.3 mi).

== Administrative divisions ==
The township comprises the villages of Anjiao, Beihua, Beiqian, Guanhe, Guanshun, Houzeng, Liugui, Longjiao, Pingxi, Renli, Touzhu, Tungguang, Tungguo, Tungrong, Wucuo, Xiguo, Xindian, Xinfu, Xizhou, Yizhu, Zhongping and Zhuanfang.

== Tourist attractions ==
- Donghouliao Church
- Donghouliao Jhao Family Historic House
- Wong Cingjiang Historic House
- Yijhu Park

== Notable natives ==
- Weng Chang-liang, Magistrate of Chiayi County
- Wong Chung-chun, member of Legislative Yuan (2008–2016)
