= Chen Ming-wen =

Taiwanese politician

- 陳明文
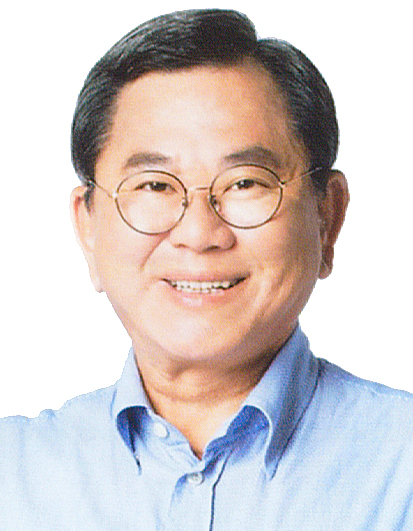
- Official portrait, 2019

Member of the Legislative Yuan
- In office 1 February 2008 – 31 January 2024
- Preceded by: Helen Chang
- Succeeded by: Kuan-Ting Chen
- Constituency: Chiayi County 2

11th Magistrate of Chiayi County
- In office 20 December 2001 – 20 December 2009
- Preceded by: Li Ya-ching
- Succeeded by: Helen Chang

Personal details
- Born: 13 May 1955 (age 71) Puzi, Chiayi County, Taiwan
- Party: Democratic Progressive Party
- Children: Chen Kuan-ting, Chen Zheng-ting (sons), Chen Kuan-ying (daughter)
- Education: Tunghai University (BA)

Chen Ming-wen (Chinese: 陳明文; pinyin: Chén Míngwén; born 13 May 1955) is a Taiwanese politician. He was the Chiayi County Magistrate from 2001 to 2009, until his election to the Legislative Yuan, where he has served since 2008.He currently serves as chair of the board of the Taiwan NextGen Foundation.

== Career ==
In 1977, upon his graduation from National Chiayi University, he was elected to the Chiayi County Council as a councilor. In 1981, Chen was elected as Chairman of the Chiayi County Council at age 27, the youngest chairman in the history of Republic of China. Later he was elected to the Taiwan Provincial Consultative Council in 1985, while completing his degree in philosophy at Tokai University, and won subsequent elections twice in 1989 and 1994 and was again elected a legislator to the Legislative Yuan in 1998. Chen served as the Magistrate of Chiayi County from 2001 to 2008, with a satisfactory rate over 60% upon retiring his office. He became a member of the Legislative Yuan and of the Central Standing Committee of the Democratic Progressive Party. Chen is tipped to become the next generation leader of the DPP, ranked after former premier Su Tseng-Chang and the party chairman Tsai Ing-wen.

=== Incidents ===
On 3 September 2019, Chen said that he had misplaced a suitcase containing NT$3 million while traveling on Taiwan High Speed Rail. The suitcase was later recovered and the police were notified, according to contemporaneous reports. Chen's youngest son said the money was intended for business-related expenses connected to plans to open a bubble tea shop in the Philippines.
