= List of county magistrates of Chiayi =

The Chiayi County Magistrate is the chief executive of the Chiayi County government in Taiwan. Initially magistrates were appointed by the Taiwan Provincial Government, but from 1951 the role has been directly elected by the population of Chiayi County. The current magistrate is Weng Chang-liang of Democratic Progressive Party since 25 December 2018.

== Directly elected magistrates ==
In the multi-party era (1987 onwards) the post has been held three times by the Kuomintang and six times by the Democratic Progressive Party. Under current rules magistrates serve four-year terms, and can stand for re-election once.

Kuomintang Independent Chinese Youth Party Democratic Progressive Party

№	Portrait	Name (Birth–Death)	Term of Office		Term	Political Party
1		Lin Chin-sheng 林金生; Lín Jīnshēng (1916-2001)	1 June 1951	2 June 1954	1	Kuomintang
		Lee Mao-sung 李茂松; Lǐ Màosōng	2 June 1954	November 1955	2	Independent
2		Lee Mao-sung 李茂松; Lǐ Màosōng	2 June 1954	November 1955	2	Chinese Youth Party
—		Chin Lu 金輅; Jīn Lù	November 1955	2 June 1957	2	Kuomintang
3		Huang Tzung-kun 黃宗焜; Huáng Zōngkūn (1910–1997)	2 June 1957	2 June 1960	3	Kuomintang
3		Huang Tzung-kun 黃宗焜; Huáng Zōngkūn (1910–1997)	2 June 1960	4 April 1963	4	Kuomintang
—		Hou Chuan-cheng 侯全成; Hóu Quánchéng	5 April 1963	13 April 1964	4	Kuomintang
3		Huang Tzung-kun 黃宗焜; Huáng Zōngkūn (1910–1997)	13 April 1964	2 June 1964	4	Kuomintang
4		Ho Mao-chu 何茂取; Hé Màoqǔ (1900–1980)	2 June 1964	2 June 1968	5	Kuomintang
5		Huang Lao-ta 黃老達; Huáng Lǎodá (1908–1981)	2 June 1968	1 February 1973	6	Kuomintang
6		Chen Chia-hsiung 陳嘉雄; Chén Jiāxióng (1927–1976)	1 February 1973	7 May 1976	7	Kuomintang
—		Chang Ping-nan 張柄楠; Zhāng Bǐngnán	13 May 1976	20 December 1977	7	Kuomintang
7		Tu Te-chi 涂德錡; Tú Déqí (1934-2011)	20 December 1977	20 December 1981	8	Kuomintang
7		Tu Te-chi 涂德錡; Tú Déqí (1934-2011)	20 December 1981	20 December 1985	9	Kuomintang
8		Ho Chia-jung 何嘉榮; Hé Jiāróng (1945–)	20 December 1985	20 December 1989	10	Kuomintang
9		Chen Shih-yung 陳適庸; Chén Shìyōng (1948–2022)	20 December 1989	20 December 1993	11	Kuomintang
10		Li Ya-ching 李雅景; Lǐ Yǎjǐng (1949-)	20 December 1993	20 December 1997	12	Kuomintang
10		Li Ya-ching 李雅景; Lǐ Yǎjǐng (1949-)	20 December 1997	20 December 2001	13	Kuomintang
11		Chen Ming-wen 陳明文; Chén Míngwén (1955-)	20 December 2001	20 December 2005	14	Democratic Progressive Party
11		Chen Ming-wen 陳明文; Chén Míngwén (1955-)	20 December 2005	29 October 2008	15	Democratic Progressive Party
—		Huang Kuei-nan 黃癸楠; Huáng Guǐnán	29 October 2008	9 December 2008	15	
11		Chen Ming-wen 陳明文; Chén Míngwén (1955-)	9 December 2008	20 December 2009	15	Democratic Progressive Party
12		Helen Chang 張花冠; Zhāng Huāguān (1954-)	20 December 2009	25 December 2014	16	Democratic Progressive Party
12		Helen Chang 張花冠; Zhāng Huāguān (1954-)	25 December 2014	25 December 2018	17	Democratic Progressive Party
13		Weng Chang-liang 翁章梁; Wēng Zhāngliáng (1965-)	25 December 2018	25 December 2022	18	Democratic Progressive Party
13		Weng Chang-liang 翁章梁; Wēng Zhāngliáng (1965-)	25 December 2022	Incumbent	19	Democratic Progressive Party
