= Helen Chang =

Politician from Taiwan

Helen Chang Chang Hwa-kuan
- 張花冠
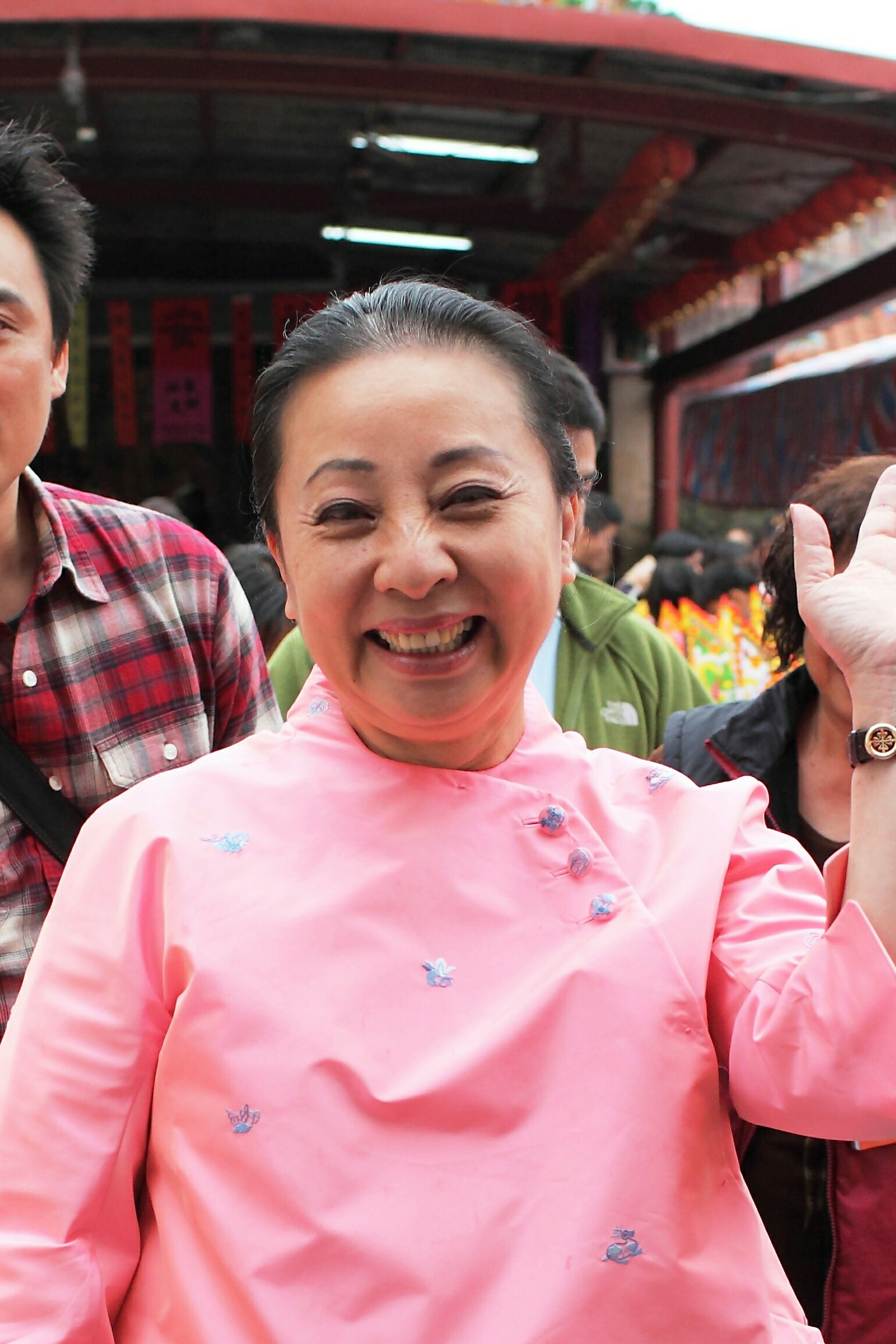

12th Magistrate of Chiayi
- In office 20 December 2009 – 25 December 2018
- Preceded by: Chen Ming-Wen
- Succeeded by: Weng Chang-liang

Personal details
- Born: 7 July 1954 (age 71) Xikou, Chiayi County, Taiwan
- Party: Democratic Progressive Party
- Education: National Chung Hsing University (BBA); National Chung Cheng University (MA)

Helen Chang or Chang Hua-kuan (Chinese: 張花冠; pinyin: Zhāng Huāguān; born 7 July 1954) is a Taiwanese politician. She has served as the Magistrate of Chiayi County since 20 December 2009.

== Education ==
Chang obtained her bachelor's degree in business administration from National Chung Hsing University and her master's degree in strategic and international affairs from National Chung Cheng University.

== Political careers ==
=== 2008 legislative election ===
Chang participated in the 2008 legislative election representing Chiayi County 2 constituency.

No.	Candidate	Party	Votes	Ratio	Elected
1	Helen Chang	Democratic Progressive Party	65,192	57.06%	
2	Huang Mao (黃茂)	Taiwan Constitution Association	940	0.82%	
3	Tu Wun Sheng (涂文生)	Kuomintang	48,131	42.12%	

=== 2009 Chiayi County magistrate election ===
Chang was elected Magistrate of Chiayi County on 5 December 2009 under the Democratic Progressive Party and assumed office on 20 December 2009. She was reelected for a second term on 29 November 2014.

2014 Chiayi County Magistrate Election Result
No.	Candidate	Party	Votes	Percentage	Elected
1	Huang Hong-cheng (黃宏成)	Independent	8,639	2.82%	
2	Helen Chang	DPP	193,399	63.09%	
3	Won Chung-chun (翁重鈞)	KMT	104,488	34.09%	
