= Alishan Forest Railway Garage Park =

Railway workshop in East, Chiayi City, Taiwan

- 阿里山森林鐵路車庫園區
- Interactive map of the Alishan Forest Railway Garage Park area
- Alternative names: Chiayi Garage Park

General information
- Type: railway workshop
- Location: East, Chiayi City, Taiwan
- Coordinates: 23°29′08.7″N 120°27′07.4″E

Alishan Forest Railway Garage Park (traditional Chinese: 阿里山森林鐵路車庫園區; simplified Chinese: 阿里山森林铁路车库园区; pinyin: Ālǐshān Sēnlín Tiělù Chēkù Yuánqū) is a railway workshop of Alishan Forest Railway in East District, Chiayi City, Taiwan.

== Exhibitions ==
The park consists of a garage and reparation facility. It displays various display of trains from steam locomotives, diesel locomotives, passenger cars and freight cars.

== Transportation ==
The workshop is accessible within walking distance southwest of Beiman Station of Alishan Forest Railway.

== See also ==
- Rail transport in Taiwan
