= Beimen station =

Beimen Station may refer to:

- Beimen railway station in Chiayi City, Taiwan
- Beimen metro station in Taipei City, Taiwan
