= Lantan Lake =

Lake in East, Chiayi City, Taiwan

- 蘭潭水庫 (Chinese)
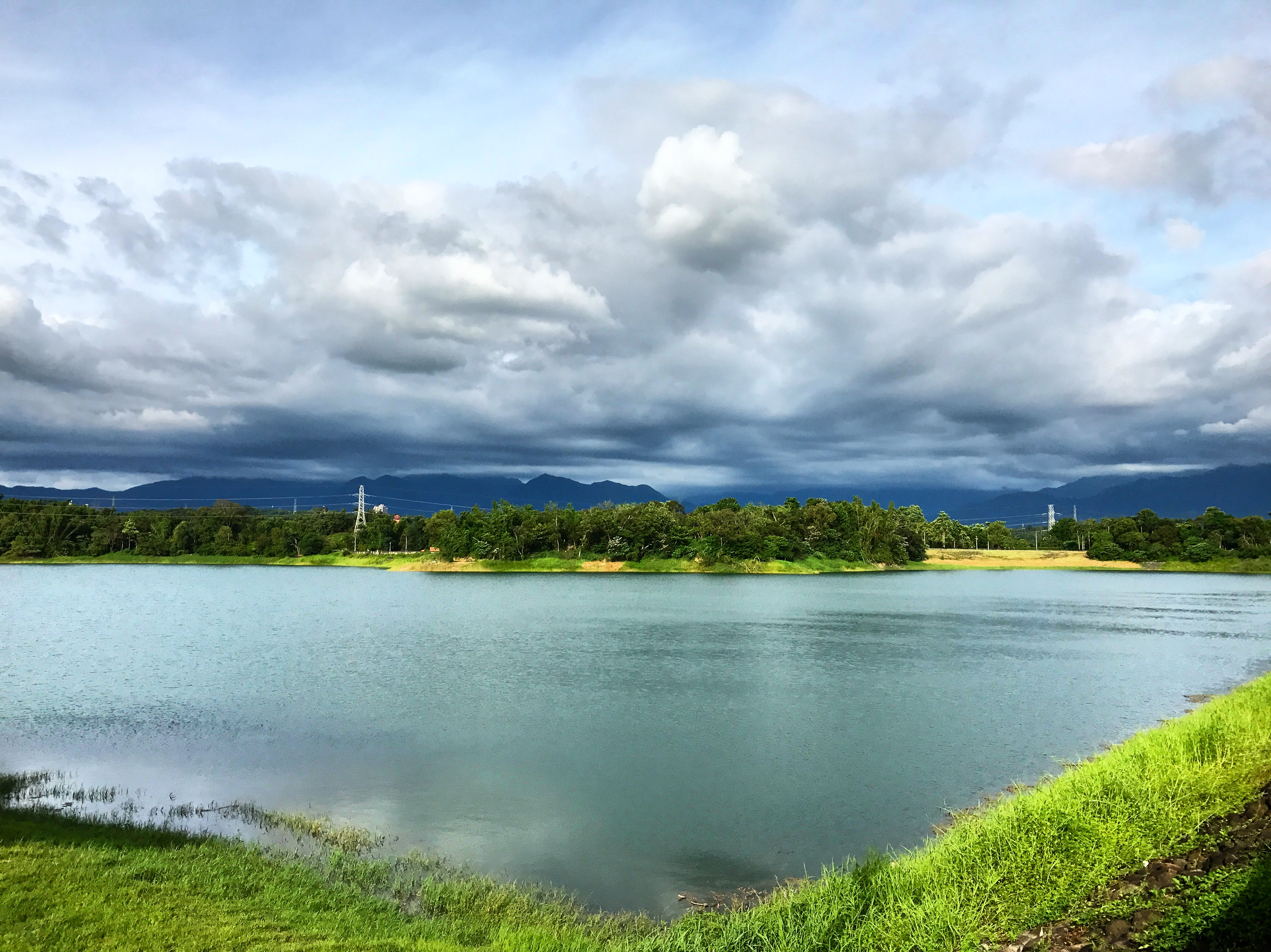

- Location within Chiayi City
- Location: East, Chiayi City, Taiwan
- Coordinates: 23°28′22.6″N 120°28′45.9″E
- Type: reservoir
- Primary inflows: Bazhang River
- Surface area: 2 square kilometres (0.77 sq mi)
- Water volume: 9,790,000 cubic metres (346,000,000 cu ft)

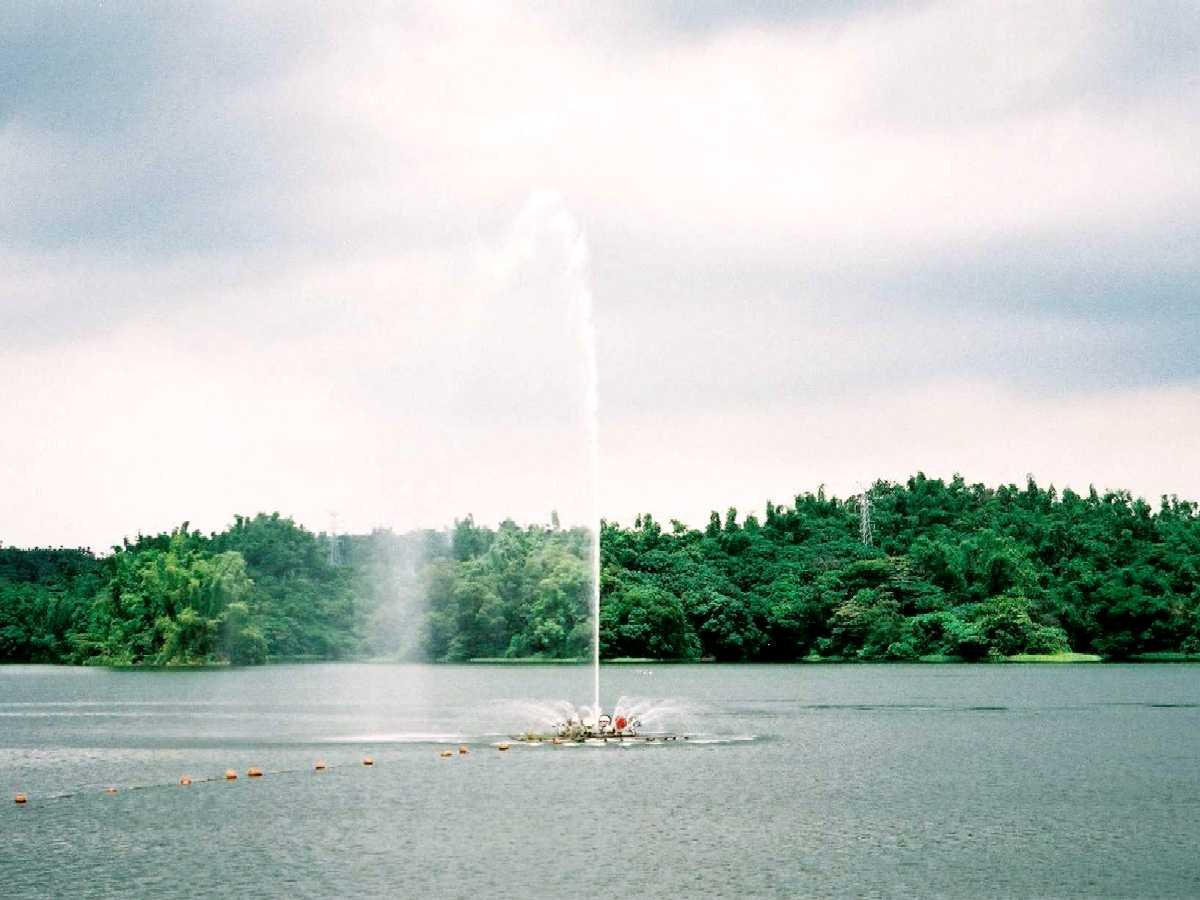
Fountain at Lantan Lake

Lantan Lake (traditional Chinese: 蘭潭水庫; simplified Chinese: 兰潭水库; pinyin: Lántán Shuǐkù) or Orchid Lake is a lake and reservoir in East District, Chiayi City, Taiwan.

== History ==
The lake is also called the Holland Lake, Dutch Lake, and Hong-Mao Pei (see ang mo) because the lake was dug by the Dutch around 300 years ago during the Dutch Formosa rule by taking it source from the Bazhang River to irrigate the broad fields run by the Dutch East India Company. This system lasted until the beginning of Kingdom of Tungning in Taiwan in which the lake laid in ruins until the Qing Dynasty rule. In the late Japanese rule period, the dam was reconstructed.

== Geography ==
The reservoir can contain 9,790,000 m^{3} (346,000,000 cu ft) of water as the main water resource of Chiayi City. It covers an area of 2 km^{2} (0.77 sq mi).

== Features ==
A fountain is set up on the lake with water surging up to 50 meters (160 ft).

== Transportation ==
The lake is accessible by Chiayi City Bus route 1 and route 66 from Chiayi Station of Taiwan Railway.

== See also ==
- Geography of Taiwan
