= Chiayi Old Prison =

Former prison in Chiayi City, Taiwan

Chiayi Old Prison 嘉義舊監獄
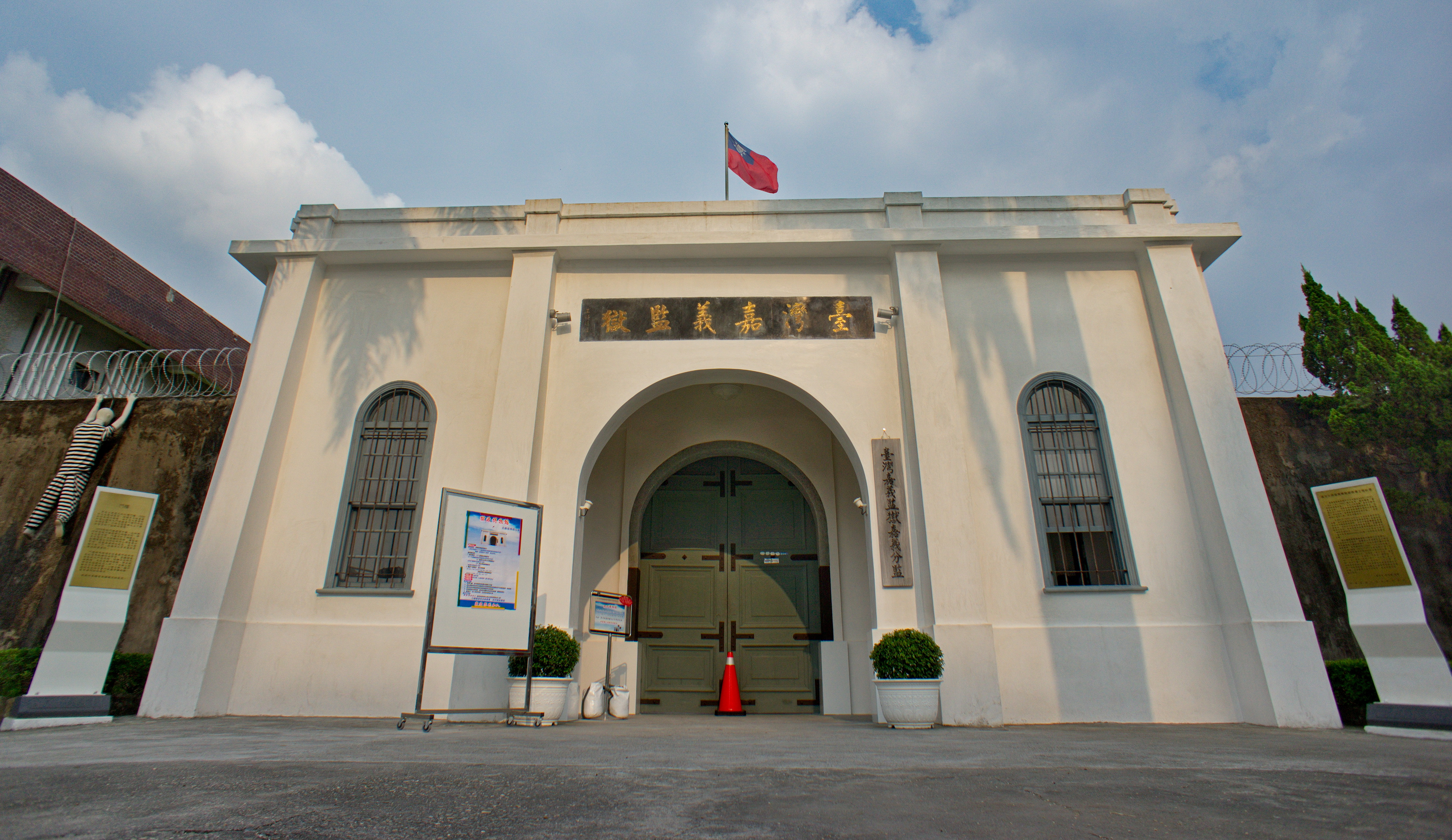
- Interactive map of Chiayi Old Prison 嘉義舊監獄
- Location: East, Chiayi City, Taiwan; 23.4862°N 120.45910°E
- Status: Museum
- Opened: 1922
- Former name: Tainan Prison Chiayi Branch

Chiayi Old Prison (traditional Chinese: 嘉義舊監獄; simplified Chinese: 嘉义旧监狱; pinyin: Jiāyì Jiù Jiānyù) is a former prison located at 140 Wei Hsin Road, East District, Chiayi City, Taiwan. It underwent restoration and reopened as the Chiayi Prison Museum (traditional Chinese: 獄政博物館; simplified Chinese: 狱政博物馆; pinyin: Yùzhèng Bówùguǎn) in 2011. It was designated as a historic monument of Taiwan in 2005.

== History ==
Chiayi Prison commenced its operation in 1922 under the name of Tainan Prison Chiayi Branch. In 1994, the Chiayi Prison was relocated to Lucao Township in Chiayi County.

== Architecture ==
A distinct feature of the Chiayi Old Prison is the radial layout of the prison blocks with a staff positioned hall in the center. In contrast to the design of panopticon prisons, individual cells cannot be seen by the staff in the central hall unless they enter individual prison blocks. Another other similar Pennsylvania-style prison building is the Abashiri Prison in Hokkaido, Japan.

== Transportation ==
The museum is accessible within walking distance East from Beimen Station of the Alishan Forest Railway.

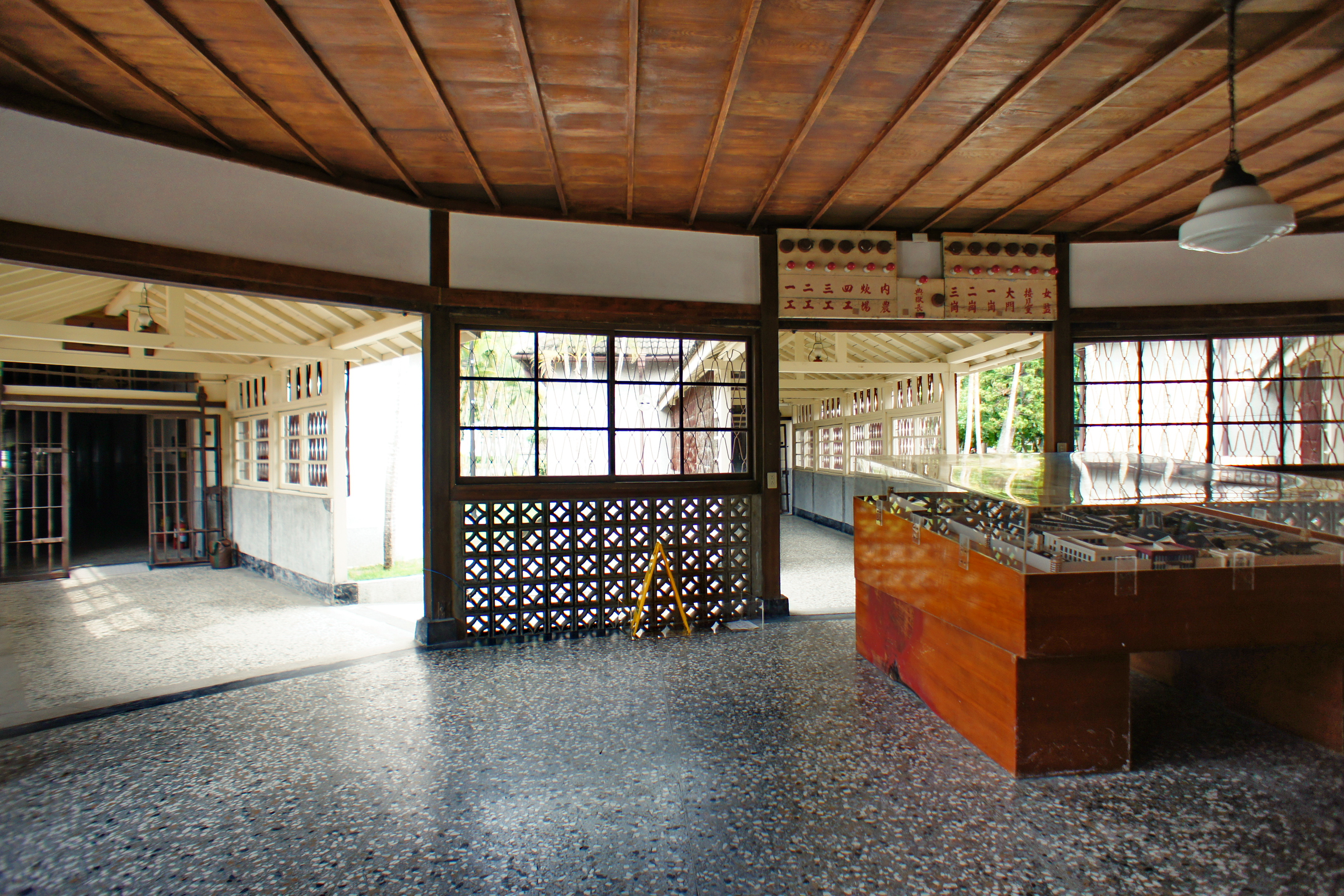
The central hall of the Chiayi Old Prison

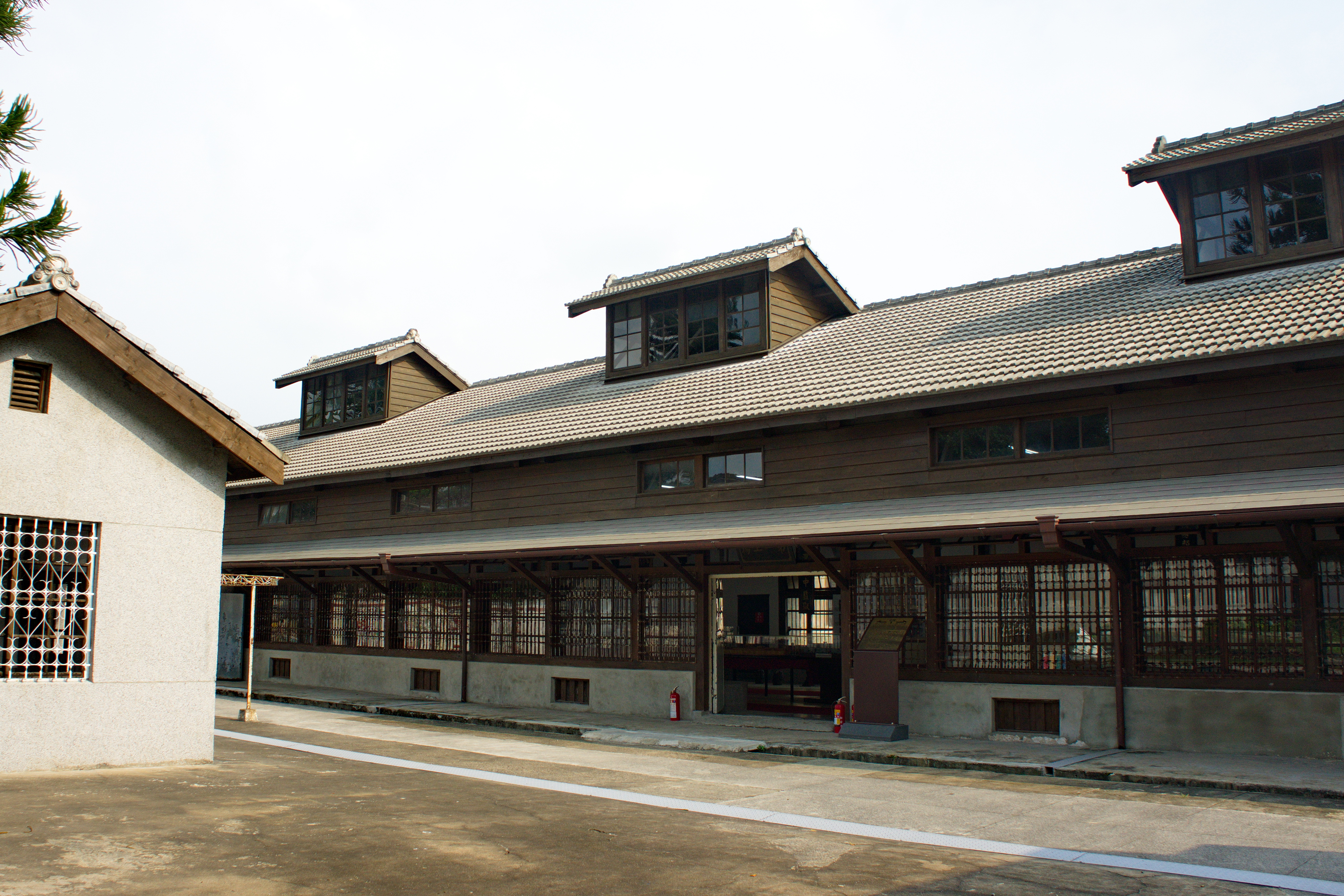
Workshop One in the Chiayi Old Prison

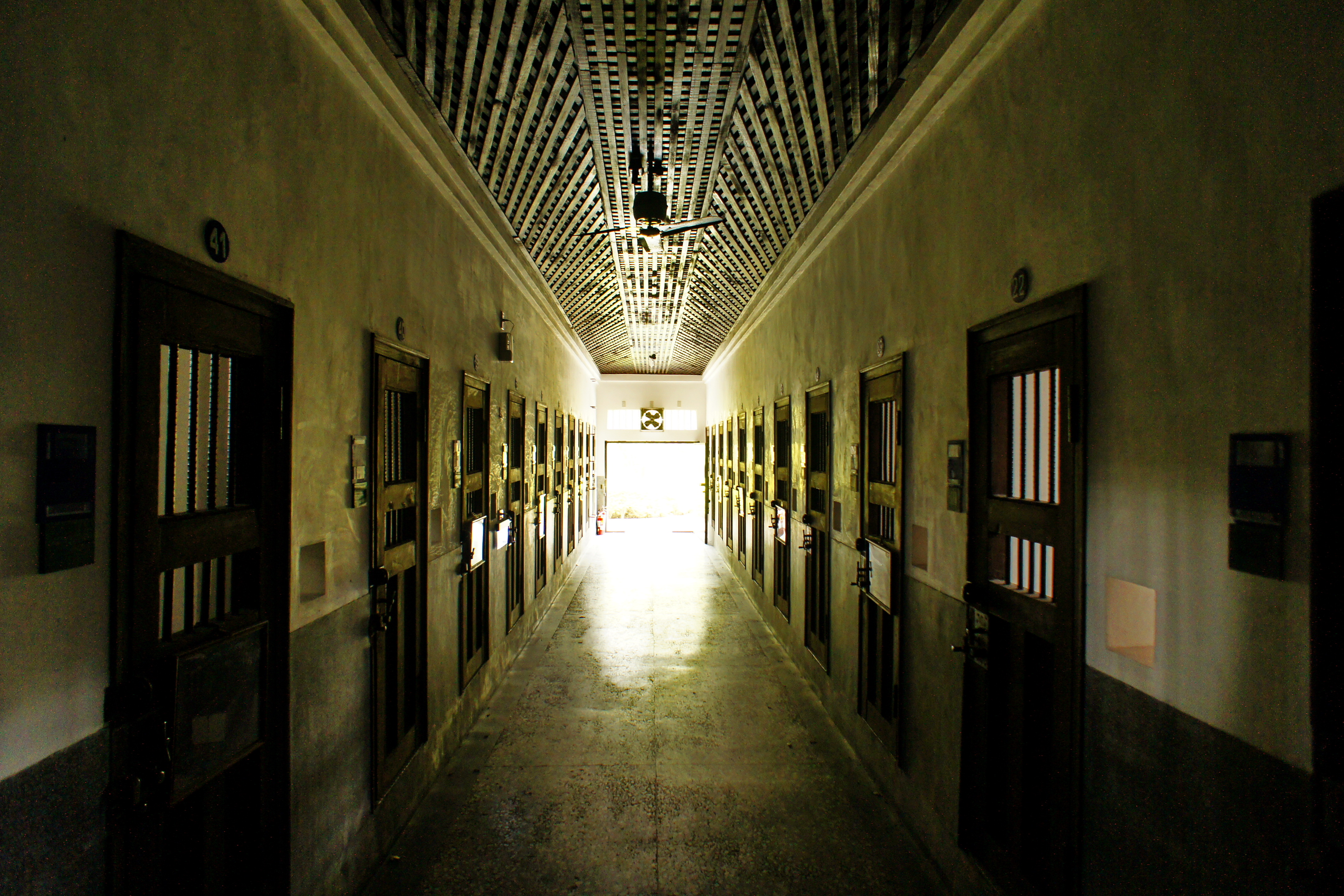
The Chih cell block of the Chiayi Old Prison

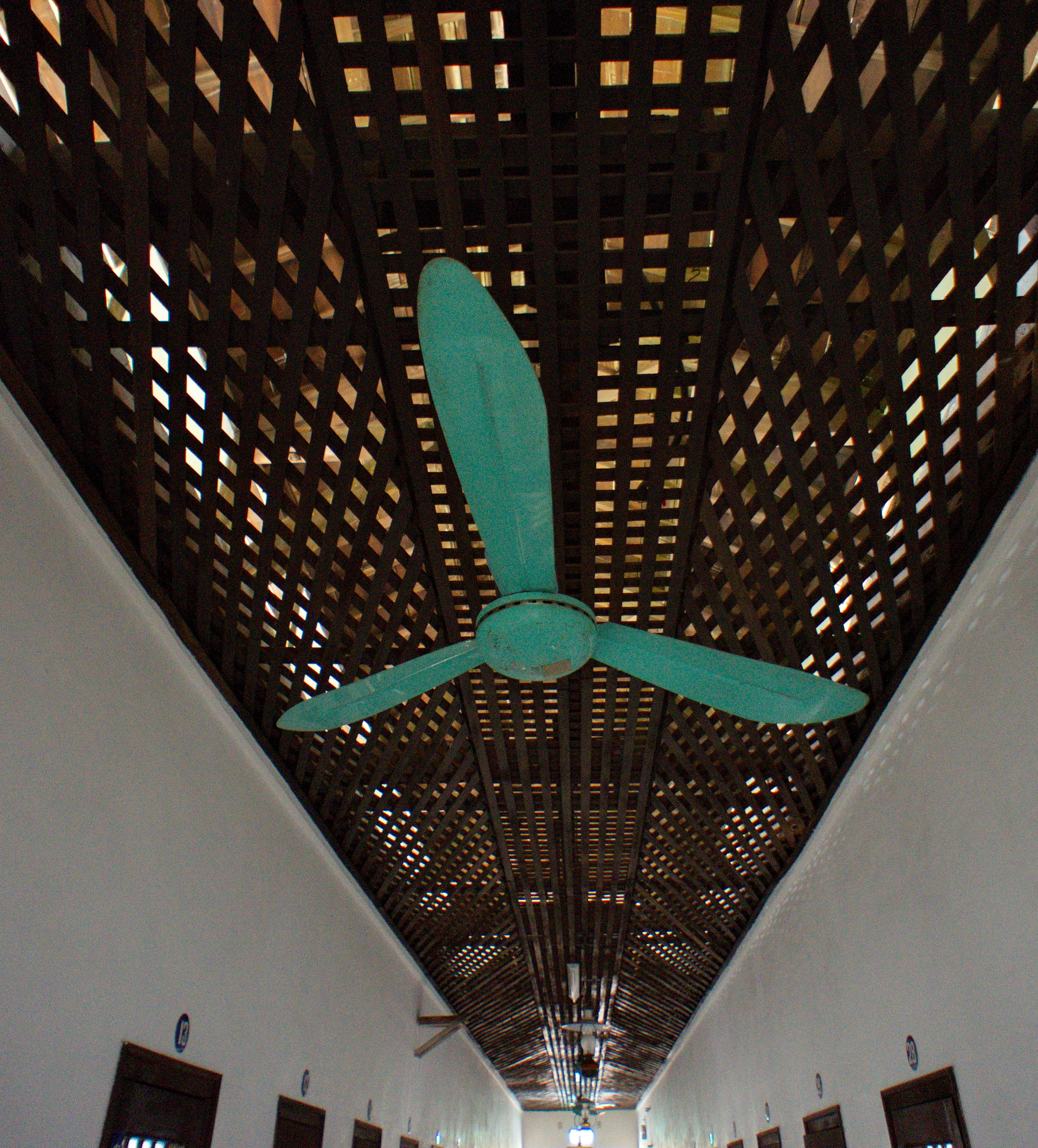
Patrolling corridor above the ceiling of the prison block

== See also ==
- List of museums in Taiwan
- Abashiri Prison
