= Beimen railway station =

Railway station in East, Chiayi City, Taiwan

Beimen 北門車站
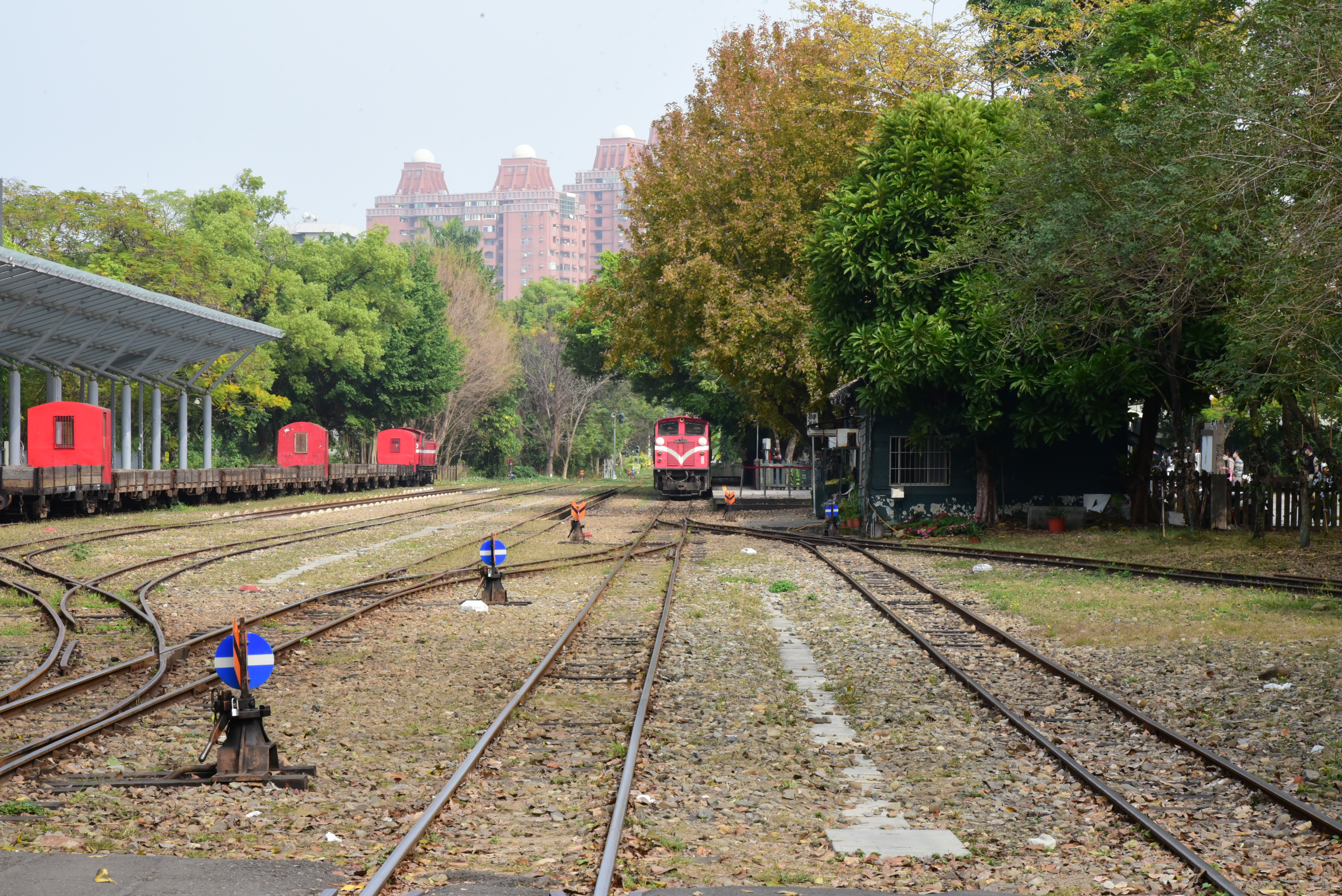

General information
- Location: East, Chiayi City, Taiwan
- Coordinates: 23°29′18.8″N 120°27′14.7″E
- Owner: Forestry and Nature Conservation Agency
- Operator: Alishan Forest Railway
- Line: Alishan
- Train operators: Alishan Forest Railway

Other information
- Website: Beimen station

History
- Opened: 1 October 1912

Services
Preceding station	Alishan Forest Railway	Following station
Lumachan towards Alishan	Main line	Chiayi Terminus
Location

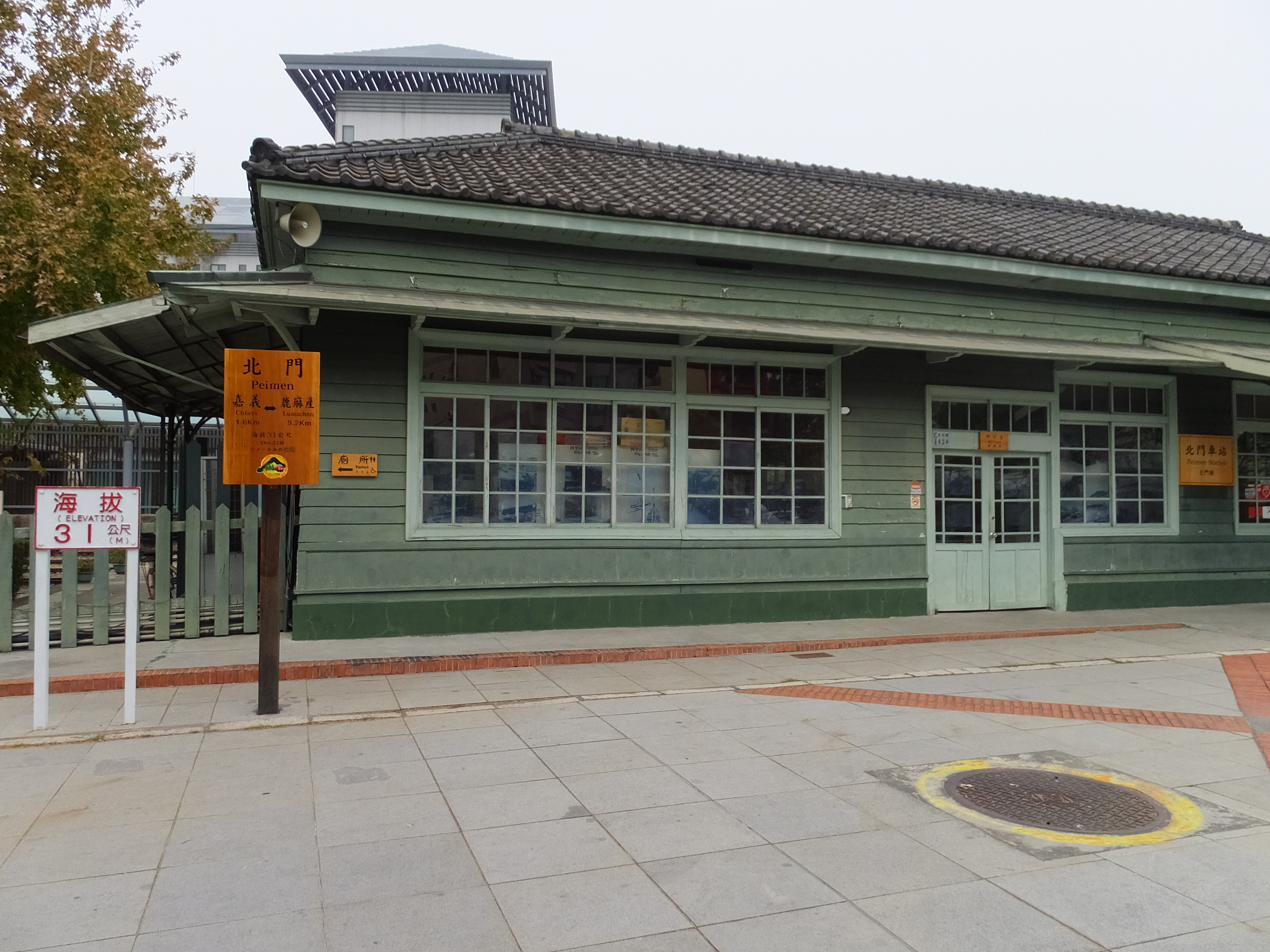
The original station building, built in 1912, is a designated historic monument.

Beimen (traditional Chinese: 北門車站; simplified Chinese: 北门车站; pinyin: Běimén Chēzhàn) (literally "North gate") is a railway station on the Alishan Forest Railway line located in East District, Chiayi City, Taiwan.

== History ==
The station was opened on 1 October 1912.

On 16 May 1998, the original station building caught on fire, which resulted in 40% of the station's right sideburning. The Chiayi Forest District Office planned a budget to restore the station, and restoration work with red cypress was completed on 7 November the same year.

In August 1999, a section of the railway between Fenqihu station and Alishan station was badly damaged by Typhoon Morakot. On 20 September 1999, it was damaged again by the 1999 Jiji earthquake. After restoration efforts, a successful trial run of the train between Beimen Station and Alishan Station was made on 16 September 2015.

== Architecture ==
The station is a Japanese architectural style building made of wood.

== Around the station ==
- Chiayi Old Prison
- Chiayi Park
- Hinoki Village
- Renyitan Dam

== See also ==
- List of railway stations in Taiwan
