= Hinoki Village =

Cultural center in East, Chiayi City, Taiwan

- 檜意森活村
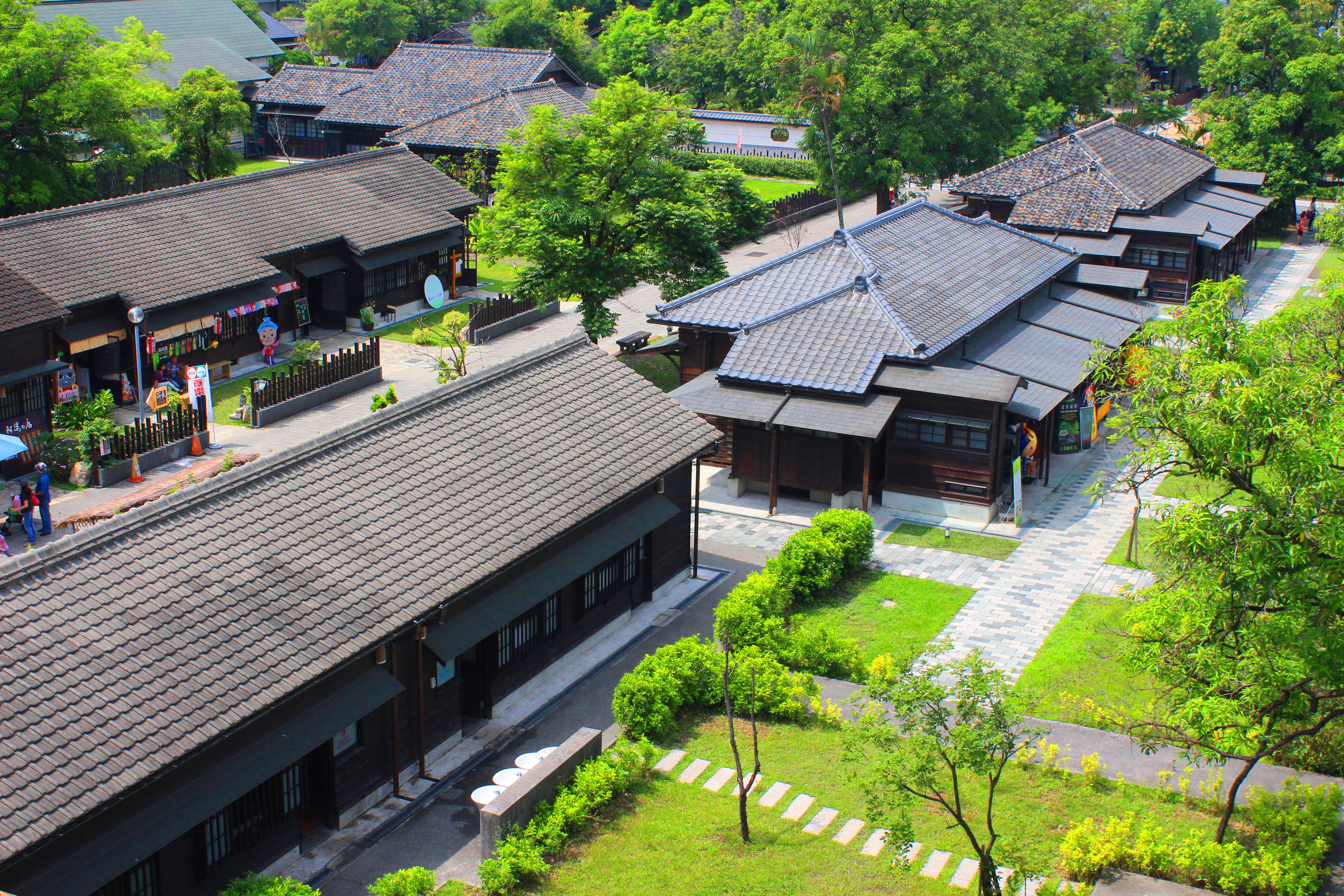
- Interactive map of the Hinoki Village area

General information
- Location: East, Chiayi City, Taiwan
- Coordinates: 23°29′10.3″N 120°27′14.8″E

Technical details
- Floor area: 3.4 hectares

Website
- Official website (in Chinese)

The Hinoki Village or Cypress Forest Life Village (traditional Chinese: 檜意森活村; simplified Chinese: 桧意森活村; pinyin: Guìyì Sēnhuó Cūn) is a culture village in East District, Chiayi City, Taiwan.

== History ==
The village was originally the dormitories of the Chiayi Forest division of Forestry Bureau of the Taiwan Governor General Office during the Japanese rule of Taiwan. On 26 February 2009, the Executive Yuan approved the establishment of the center. Construction commenced shortly and was completed in 2013. The transfer of operation of the village was completed on 28 September 2013. The village started its operation in January 2014.

== Architecture ==
The village consists of 28 wooden Japanese-style dormitories and also Alishan Forest Club, director's official residence, guest house, public bathhouse etc. The construction of the village took the basis of the existing building in the area by renovating and dismantling the original partition walls of each building as an open space for landscaping or visitors.

== Transportation ==
The village is accessible within walking distance south of Beimen Station of Alishan Forest Railway.

== See also ==
- Alishan Forest Railway
