= Dijiu Suspension Bridge =

Suspension bridge in Fanlu, Chiayi County, Taiwan

Dijiu Suspension Bridge 地久吊橋
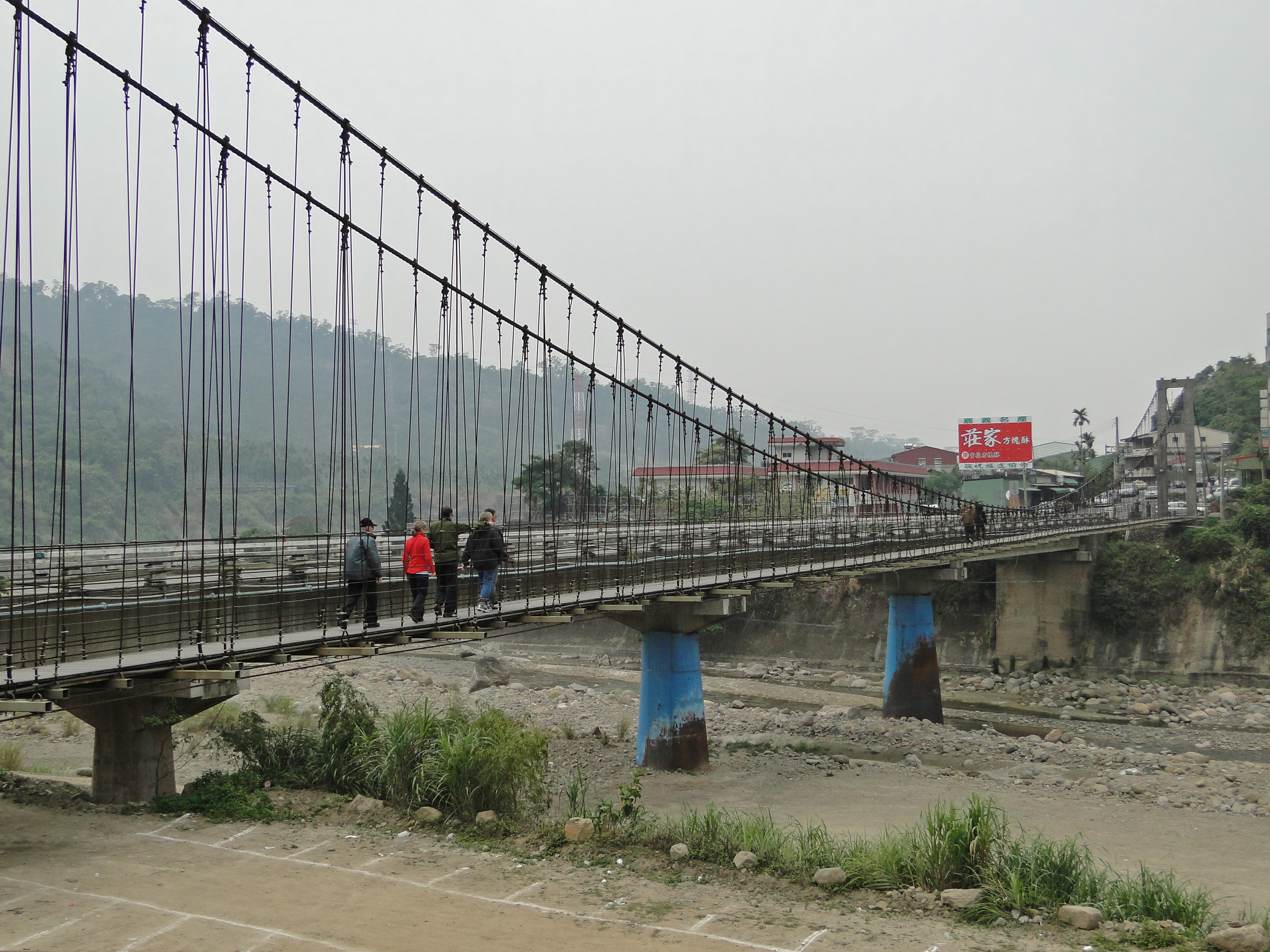
- Coordinates: 23°26′20.1″N 120°36′22.3″E
- Crosses: Bazhang River
- Locale: Fanlu, Chiayi County, Taiwan

Characteristics
- Design: suspension bridge

History
- Opened: 1937

Location
- Interactive map of Dijiu Suspension Bridge

The Dijiu Suspension Bridge (traditional Chinese: 地久吊橋; simplified Chinese: 地久吊桥; pinyin: Dìjiǔ Dàqiáo) is a pedestrian suspension bridge in Fanlu Township, Chiayi County, Taiwan. It crosses the Bazhang River.

== History ==
The bridge, along with the Tianchang Suspension Bridge, was constructed in 1937. Both were constructed during the Japanese rule of Taiwan, in celebration of the birthdays of the emperor and his wife. This bridge was particularly for the commemoration of the empress’s birthday, Chikyūsetsu in Japanese, or Dìjiǔ Jié in Chinese, hence the name Dijiu Suspension Bridge.

== Transportation ==
The bridge is accessible by bus from Chiayi Station of Taiwan Railway.

== See also ==
- List of bridges in Taiwan
