= Bazhang River =

River in Taiwan

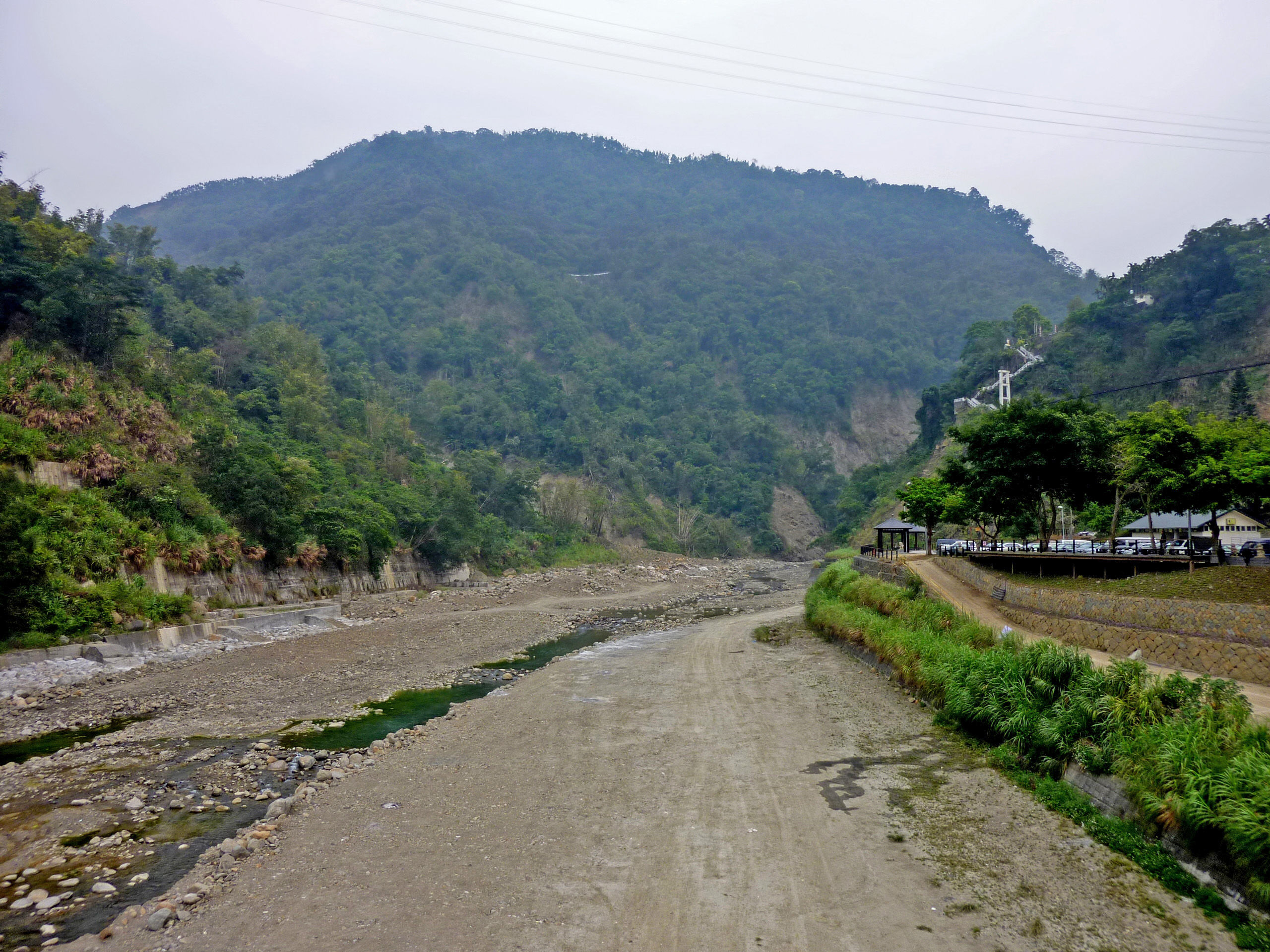
- Bazhang River near Chukou

Location
- Country: Taiwan
- City: Chiayi City, Chiayi County, Tainan City

Physical characteristics
- Source
  - location: Alishan, Chiayi County
  - elevation: 1,940 m (6,360 ft)
- Mouth: Taiwan Strait
  - location: Budai, Chiayi County
  - coordinates: 23.324°N 120.129°E
  - elevation: 0 m (0 ft)
- Length: 80.86 km (50.24 mi)
- Basin size: 474.74 km^{2} (183.30 sq mi)

The Bazhang River, also spelled Pachang River, (Chinese: 八掌溪; pinyin: Bāzhǎng Xī; Wade–Giles: Pa^{1}-chang^{3} Hsi^{1}) is a river in Taiwan. It flows through Chiayi City, Chiayi County and Tainan City for 81 km.

== History ==
On July 22, 2000, the Bazhang River experienced extreme flooding. Four workers on a riverbed construction project became trapped in the river by flash flooding. After waiting for over three hours for air rescue, to the shock of viewers on live television, the workers were swept away by floodwaters. Another flood event occurred in 2001.

== Outflows ==
- Lantan Lake

== Bridges ==
- Dijiu Suspension Bridge

== See also ==
- List of rivers in Taiwan
