= Chiayi =

City in Taiwan

Coordinates: 23°28′48″N 120°26′59″E

Chiayi City 嘉義市 Ka-gi, Kagi, Chiai, Chia-i
- City
- Chiayi City
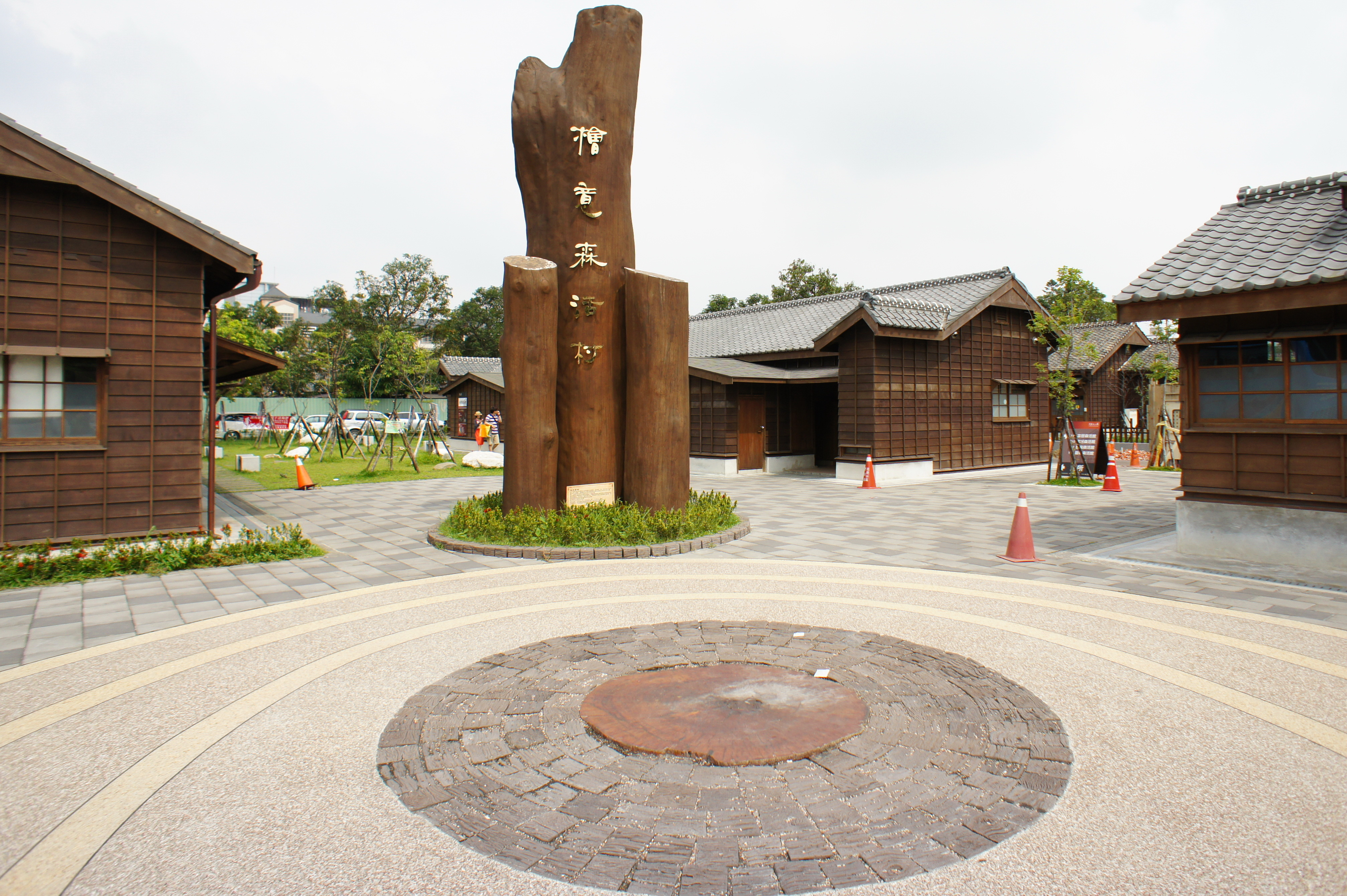
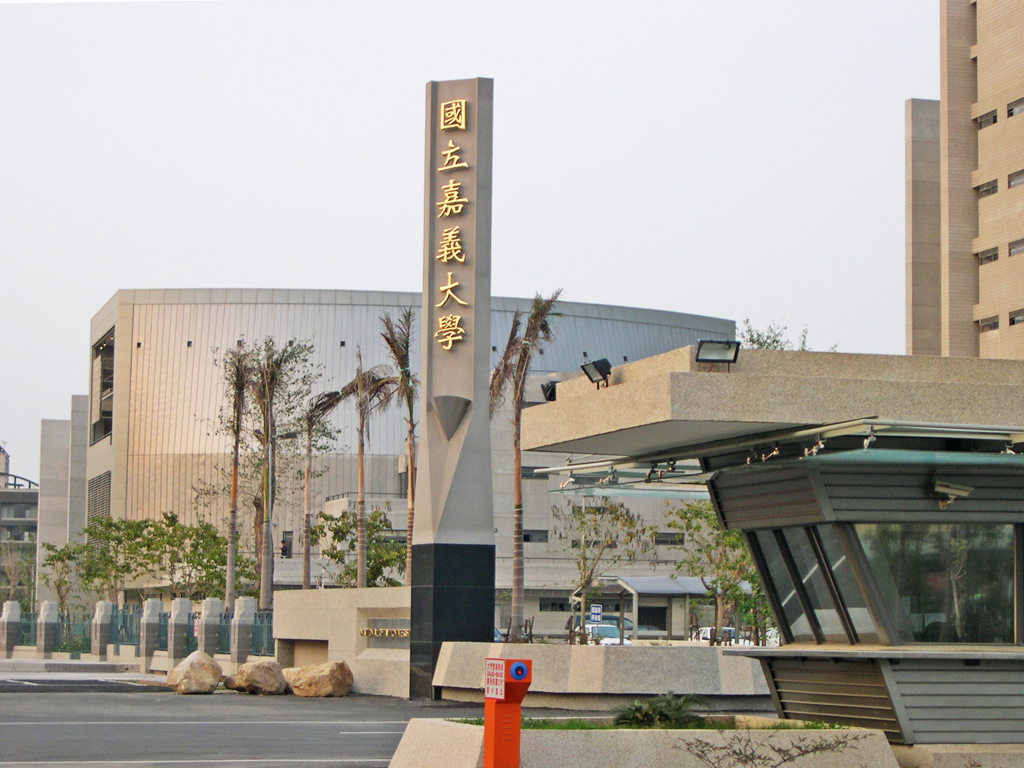
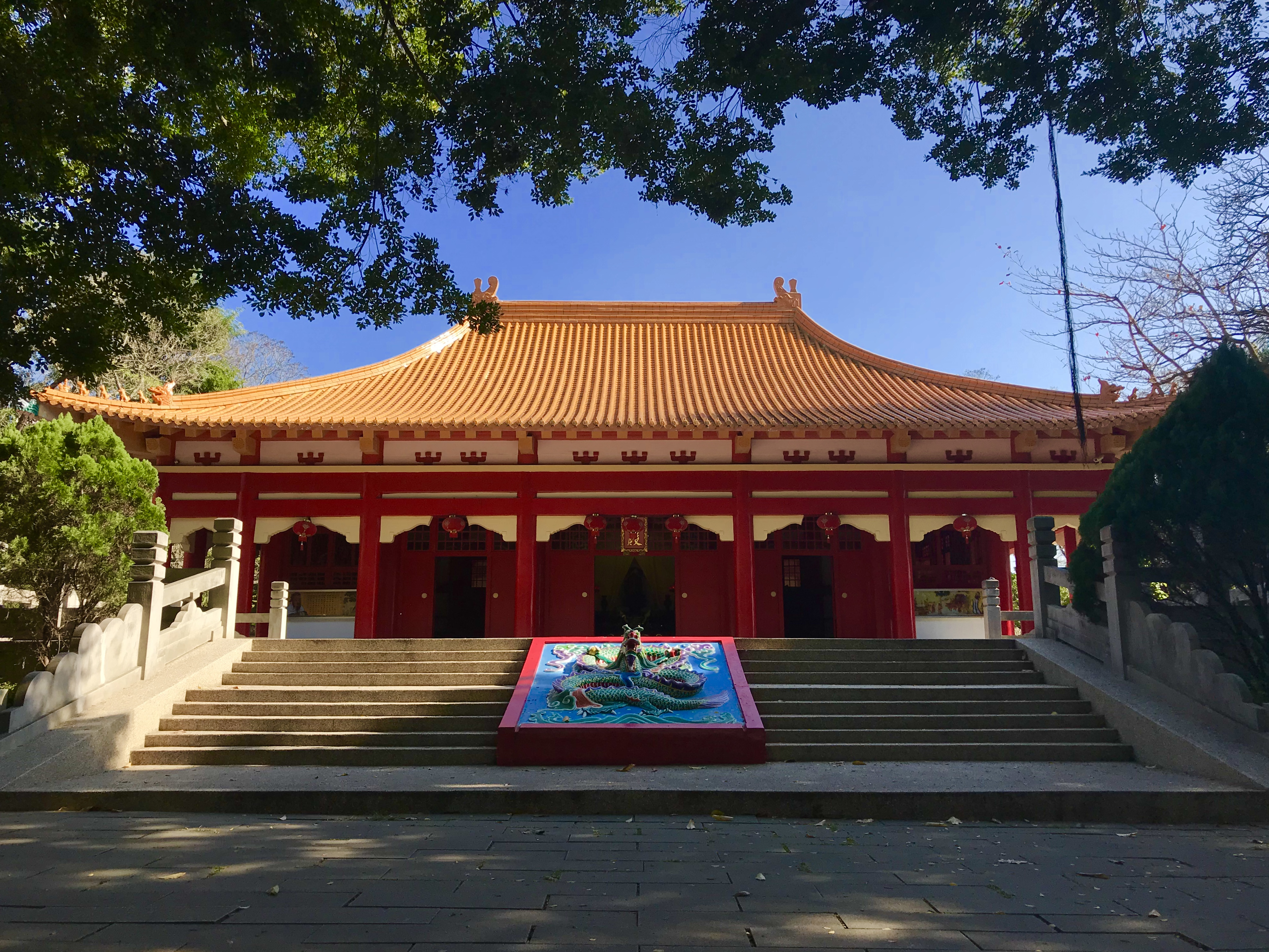
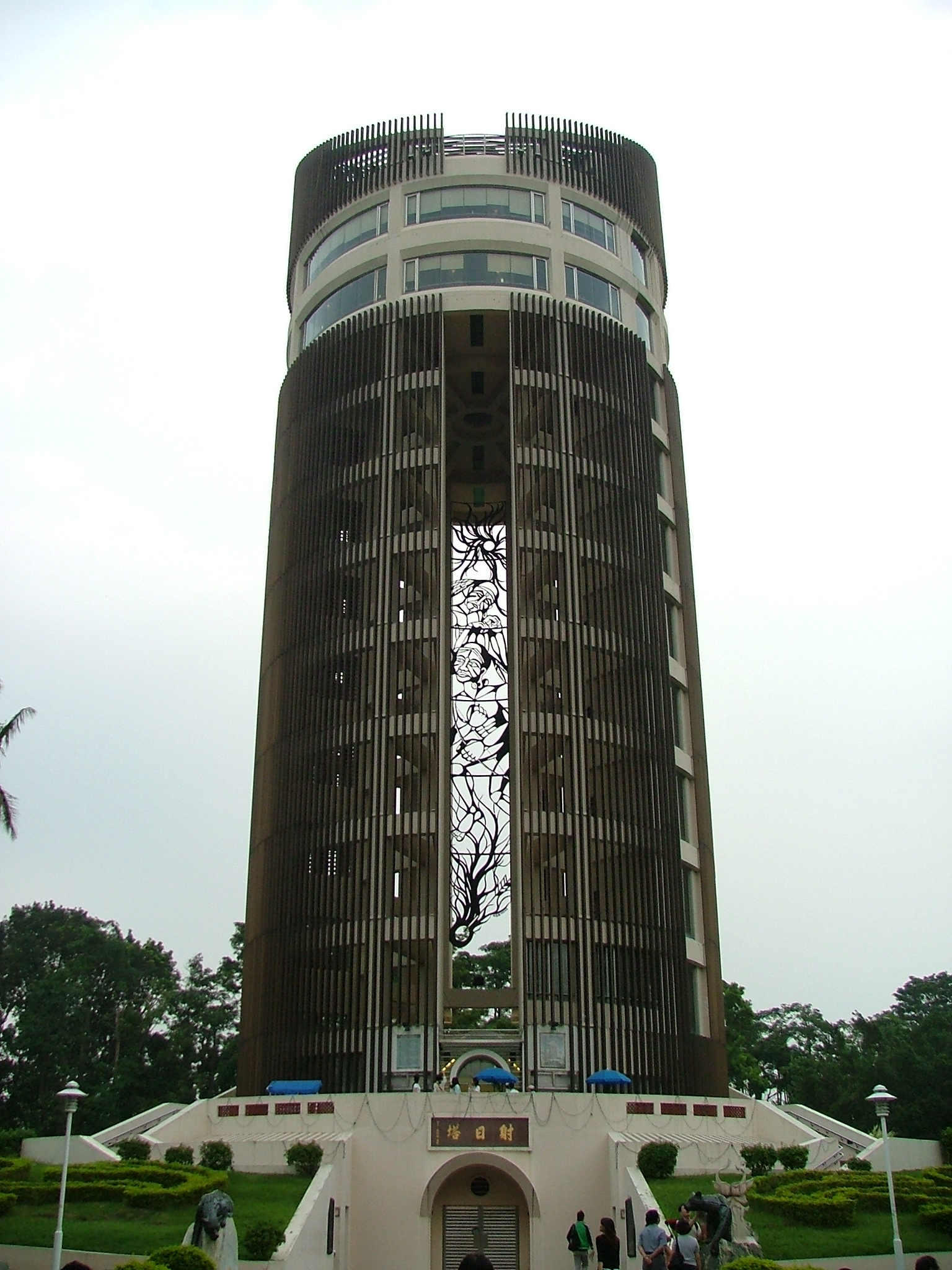
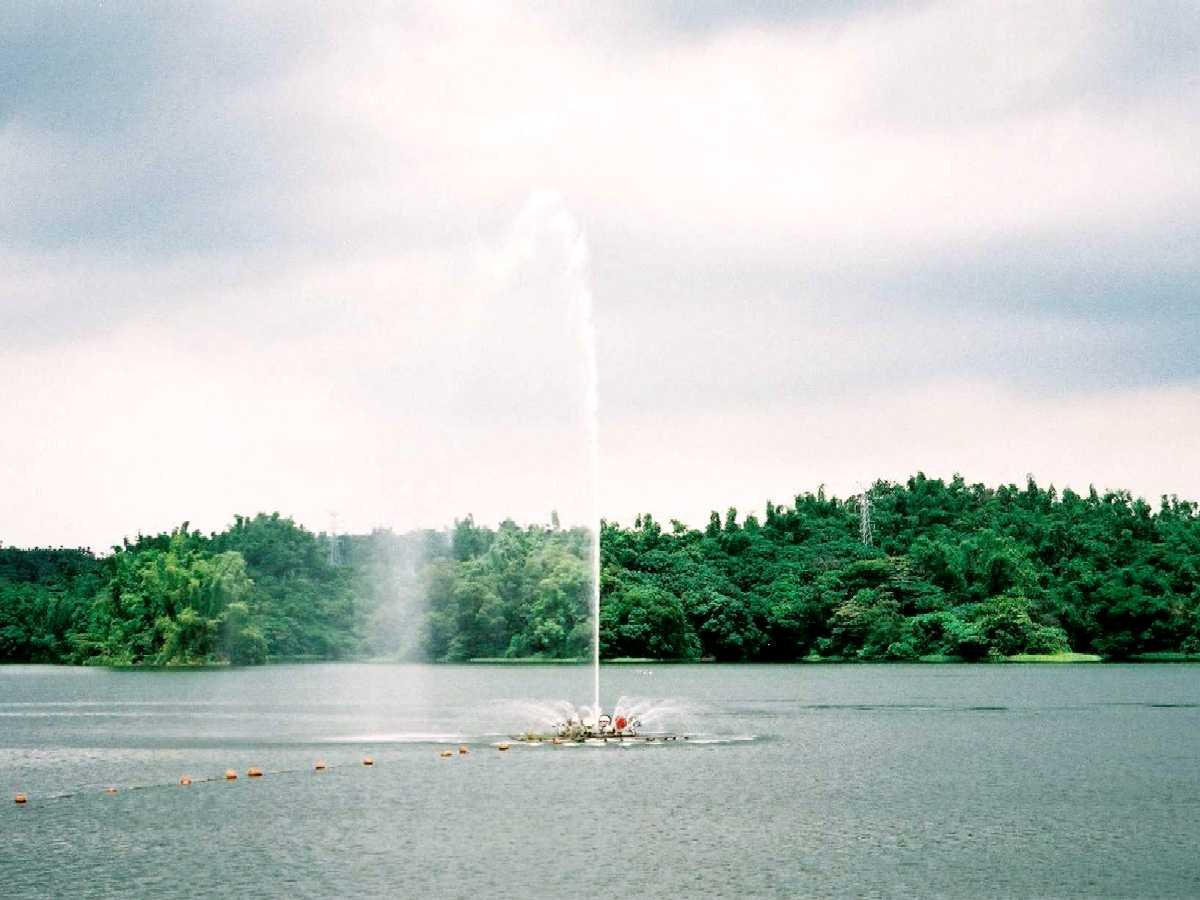
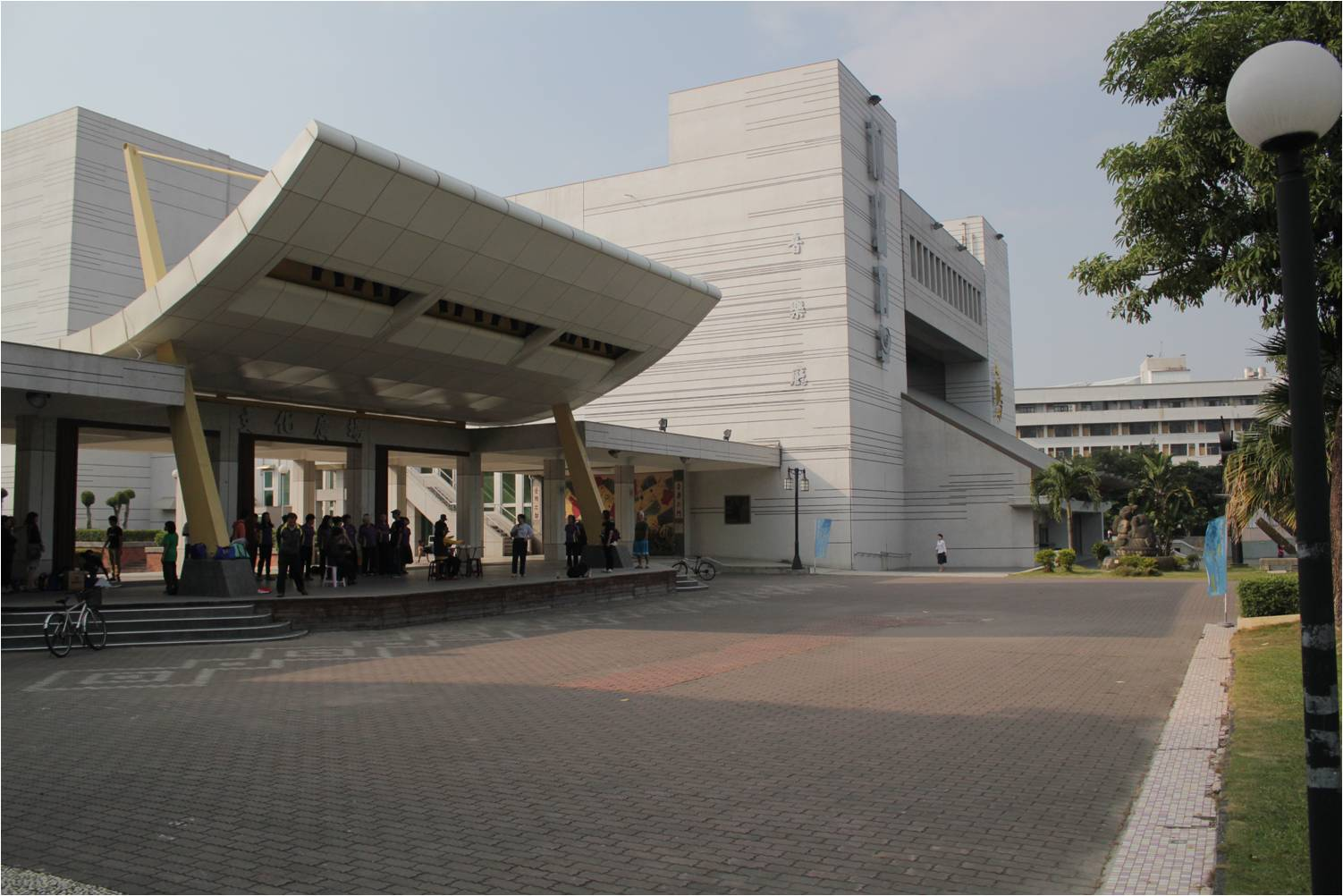
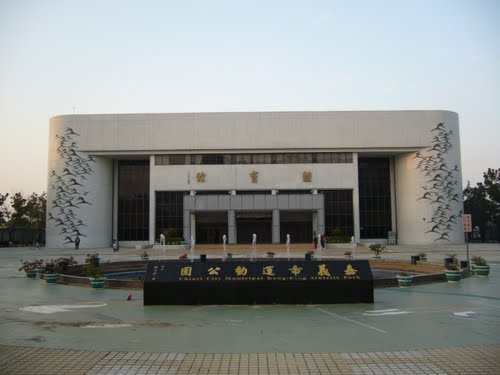
- Clockwise from top left: Hinoki Village, Chiayi Confucius Temple, Fountain at the Lantan Reservoir, Chiayi City Sports Arena, Chiayi Municipal Culture Center, Chiayi Sun Shooting Tower, National Chiayi University

- Flag Logo
- Nickname: Peach City (桃城) or Jia City (嘉市)
- Interactive map of Chiayi City
- Country: Republic of China
- Province: Taiwan^{a}
- Region: Southwestern Taiwan
- First mentioned: 1787
- Renamed to Kagi: 17 April 1895
- Autonomous city: 1930
- Provincial city: 25 October 1945
- Downgraded to county-administered city: 16 August 1950
- Provincial city status restored: 1 July 1982
- Seat: East District
- Districts: 2 districts: East; West

Government
  - Type: Chiayi City Government
  - Mayor: Huang Min-hui (KMT)

Area
  - Total: 60.03 km^{2} (23.18 sq mi)
  - Rank: 21 out of 22
- Elevation: 69 m (226 ft)

Population (January 2023)
  - Total: 263,188
  - Rank: 18 of 22
  - Density: 4,384/km^{2} (11,360/sq mi)
- Time zone: UTC+8 (National Standard Time)
- Postal code: 600
- Area code: 05
- ISO 3166 code: TW-CYI
- Flower: Hong Kong orchid tree; (Bauhinia blakeana)
- Tree: Hong Kong orchid tree
- Website: www.chiayi.gov.tw/en/
- ^{a} Provinces remain a nominal division according to the Constitution of the Republic of China, but are no longer considered to have any administrative function practically.

Chiayi City
- "Chiayi" in Traditional (top) and Simplified (bottom) Chinese characters

Chinese name
- Traditional Chinese: 嘉義市
- Simplified Chinese: 嘉义市
- Hokkien POJ: Ka-gī-chhī
Transcriptions
Standard Mandarin
- Hanyu Pinyin: Jiāyì Shì
- Bopomofo: ㄐㄧㄚ ㄧˋ ㄕˋ
- Gwoyeu Romatzyh: Jiayih Shyh
- Wade–Giles: Chia^{1}-i^{4} Shih^{4}
- Tongyong Pinyin: Jiayì Shìh
- Yale Romanization: Jyāyì Shr̀
- MPS2: Jiāyì Shr̀
- IPA: [tɕjá.î ʂɻ̩̂]
Hakka
- Pha̍k-fa-sṳ: Kâ-ngi-sṳ
Yue: Cantonese
- Yale Romanization: Gāyih Síh
- Jyutping: gaa1 ji6 si5
- IPA: [ka˥ ji˨ si˩˧]
Southern Min
- Hokkien POJ: Ka-gī-chhī
- Tâi-lô: Ka-gī-tshī

Japanese name
- Kanji: 嘉義市
- Hiragana: かぎし
- Katakana: カギシ
Transcriptions
- Revised Hepburn: Kagi-shi
- Kunrei-shiki: Kagi-si

Chiayi (/ˈdʒjɑːˈiː/), officially known as Chiayi City, (Note: In local languages: Traditional Chinese script: 嘉義市; Mandarin Pinyin: Jiāyì Shì; Hokkien: Ka-gī-tshī) is a city located in Chianan Plain in southwestern Taiwan, surrounded by Chiayi County with a population of 263,188 inhabitants as of January 2023.

The Hoanya people inhabited present-day Chiayi under its historical name of Tirosen prior to the arrival of Han Chinese in Taiwan and was ruled by the Dutch and the Kingdom of Tungning under various names. During the Qing dynasty, Tirosen was governed as part of Taiwan Prefecture in Fujian under Zhuluo County and the city was renamed Kagee in 1787. The city adopted the Japanese reading Kagi during the Japanese era. Soon afterwards an earthquake in 1906 destroyed much of the town. Kagi was administered as part of Tainan Prefecture from 1920 onwards. Following the surrender of Japan in 1945, the Republic of China, who deposed the Qing in 1911, took control of the city (which from then on was rendered as Chiayi City, following the Chinese pronunciation) and administered it as a provincial city of Taiwan Province before being integrated into Chiayi County in 1950 as a county-administered city. The city was restored to its status as a provincial city in 1982. In 1998, Taiwan Province was streamlined and Chiayi City has been governed directly since then by the Executive Yuan.

The city is known for Alishan National Scenic Area and warm humid subtropical climate in the summer months. Left with the landmarks of Japanese colonial rule, Chiayi City has the round-island railway system and Alishan Forest Railway where the city is the starting point along with various Japanese temples.

== Name ==
Like the county, Chiayi City's former Chinese placename was Tsu-lo-san (Chinese: 諸羅山; pinyin: Zhūluóshān; Pe̍h-ōe-jī: Chu-lô-san), a representation of the original Formosan-language name Tirosen. A shortened version, Tsulo, was then used to name Tsulo County, which originally covered the underdeveloped northern two-thirds of the island. In 1704, the county seat was moved to Tsulosan, the site of modern-day Chiayi City. Following the 1723 Zhu Yigui rebellion, the county was reduced in size. In 1787, the county and city were renamed Chiayi (嘉義; lit. 'commended righteousness') by the Qianlong Emperor to acknowledge the citizens' loyalty during the Lin Shuangwen rebellion.

== History ==
=== Early history ===
First inhabited by the Hoanya aborigines, the region was named Tirosen (variants Tirocen, Tiracen). With the arrival of Han Chinese immigrants in southwestern Taiwan, the name evolved to become Tsulosan (Chinese: 諸羅山; pinyin: Zhūluóshān; Pe̍h-ōe-jī: Chu-lô-san) in Hokkien. Eventually, Tsulosan was shortened to simply Tsulo. Because of the choice of the characters, it has been mistakenly suggested that the origin of the name came from the expression "mountains surrounding the east". "Peach City" is another name for Chiayi City due to its peach-shaped territory in ancient times. The tip of the peach is around Central Fountain and was called "Peach-tip" by citizens.

Tsulosan was once the foothold to which people from the mainland immigrated. In 1621, Yan Siqi, who came from Zhangzhou, Fujian Province, first led his people to cultivate this land after they landed at Ponkan (modern-day Beigang).

=== Dutch Formosa ===
Records from the Dutch era, beginning in 1624, show Tirosen as the usual form of the name; it also occurred as Tirassen, Tirozen, Tilocen, Tilossen, Tilocen, and Thilocen. The place was north of Mattau (modern-day Madou, Tainan) and south of Favorlang (Huwei, Yunlin).

=== Kingdom of Tungning ===
In 1661 (the 15th year of Yung-Li, Ming dynasty), Koxinga defeated the Dutch based in Taiwan and founded the Kingdom of Tungning. He established one province, Cheng-Tien-Fu, and two counties, Tien-Hsing and Wan-Nien, demarcated by the Hsin-Kang River (Chinese: 新港溪, now the Yanshui River). Chiayi was under the jurisdiction of the Tien-Hsing County.

=== Qing dynasty ===
In 1683, when Qing rule began, the island was governed as Taiwan Prefecture under the administration of Fujian Province. In 1684, Tsulo County was established and initially encompassed the underdeveloped northern two-thirds of Taiwan. (Taiwan and Hongsoa counties were divided from Wan-Nien County during the Kingdom of Tungning, which was changed from Tien-Hsing County.) In 1704, the county seat was moved to Tsulosan, the site of modern-day Chiayi City, and had wooden city walls.

In 1727, the county magistrate, Liu Liang-Bi rebuilt the gatehouses and set a gun platform for each gatehouse. The four gatehouses were named: "Chin Shan" (襟山) for East, "Tai Hai" (帶海) for West, "Chung Yang" (崇陽) for South, and "Kung Chen" (拱辰) for North. In 1734 (the 12th year of Yongzheng), magistrate Lu-Hung built piercing-bamboo to better protect the city.

In 1786, the Lin Shuangwen rebellion was an attempt to siege Tsulosan but failed to overcome the defense of the inhabitants. Consequently, on November 3 of the next year, the Qing Emperor conferred the name Kagee (嘉義; lit. 'commended righteousness') to praise the citizens' loyalty.

In the mid-1800s, a custom of annual riotous mass stoning developed in the city.

In 1887, a separate Taiwan Province was declared and the island was administratively divided into four prefectures; the city of Kagee belonged to Tainan Prefecture.

=== Japanese rule ===
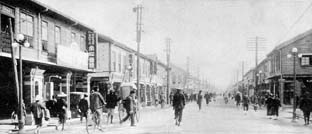
Chiayi City under Japanese rule

In 1895, Taiwan was ceded to Japan in the Treaty of Shimonoseki. The 1906 Meishan earthquake devastated the entire city wall except the Eastern Gate. The Japanese authorities reconstructed the city. Industries and trades started to flourish. According to the census taken in 1904, Kagi was the fourth most populous city in Taiwan, with a population of over twenty thousand.

The Great Kagi earthquake (later also known as the 1906 Meishan earthquake) struck the city in mid March 1906.

In looking over some of my more recent Notes, it seems impossible to make the foregoing references to Ka-gi without adding a few words about that dreadful earthquake which devastated the region in March 1906. I was there soon after, and had a profound feeling of sadness on seeing whole streets covered with fallen beams and other debris; on seeing, too, so many traces of the awful suffering on every side. Within Ka-gi city, and a limited area around, 1,216 persons were suddenly thrust out into the eternal world. Not fewer than 2,306 persons were seriously injured, and 13,259 houses were laid low. The great mysterious Power then tore the earth into deep, open chasms in several places. Many of the narrow escapes and calamities were very affecting; particularly that of our blind evangelist Toa-un, who ran out of doors with his wife as the shaking began. The demented mother, however, could not bear the thought of her two helpless young children being left behind, and she darted in to rescue them, when my poor blind pupil became childless and a widower in an instant of time. No sooner had the Governor-General at Tai-pak received telegraphic information of the magnitude of the calamity, than instructions were issued for a large company of surgeons, nurses, and assistants to proceed at once to Ka-gi. Wide hospital-sheds were erected without delay, and the work of relief was carried on with a rare amount of self-denial and promptitude. Even already, the city has lost much of its most desolate appearance, and the projected improvements give promise that it will have a more attractive look than ever. – William Campbell, 1915

In 1907, the construction of Alishan Forest Railway to Mount Ali was begun. In 1920, the city became an autonomous group as Kagi Town (嘉義街), Kagi District, within Tainan Prefecture, which included modern-day Tainan City, Chiayi County and Yunlin County. In 1930, the town was upgraded to an autonomous city under the same prefecture.

=== Republic of China ===
Chiayi City in 1946–1950

After the handover of Taiwan from Japan to the Republic of China in October 1945, Chiayi City was established as a provincial city of Taiwan Province. The city consisted of 8 districts, which were Bajiang, Beimen, Beizhen, Nanmen, Tungmen, Tungshan, Ximen and Zhuwei Districts. In 1946, the districts was reorganized to 6 districts in which Bajiang and Nanmen were merged to become Xinnan, Beimen and Beizhen were merged to become Xinbei, Tungmen and Tungshan were merged to become Xindong, Ximen and Zhuwei were merged to become Xinxi District and there were 2 addition of districts from Tainan County which were Shuishang and Taibao Districts.

Chiayi saw some of the most violent events during the 228 Incident. In early March, local militas surrounded the Shueishang Airport and fought against the KMT military. There were over 300 casualties. On 12 March 1947, negotiators for peace, including Tan Teng-pho and Phuan Bok-tsi, were arrested after arriving at the airport and were executed on 25 March. The Kuomintang also executed many civilians in Chiayi.

On 16 August 1950, because of the re-allocation of administrative areas in which Taiwan was divided into 16 counties, five provincial cities and a special bureau, Chiayi City was downgraded to a county-administered city and merged with Chiayi County to be the county seat. As a result, a shortage of capital hindered its development.

On 1 July 1982, Chiayi City was elevated again to a provincial city as a result of pressure from local elites. On 6 October 1990, the East District and West District were established.

== Geography ==
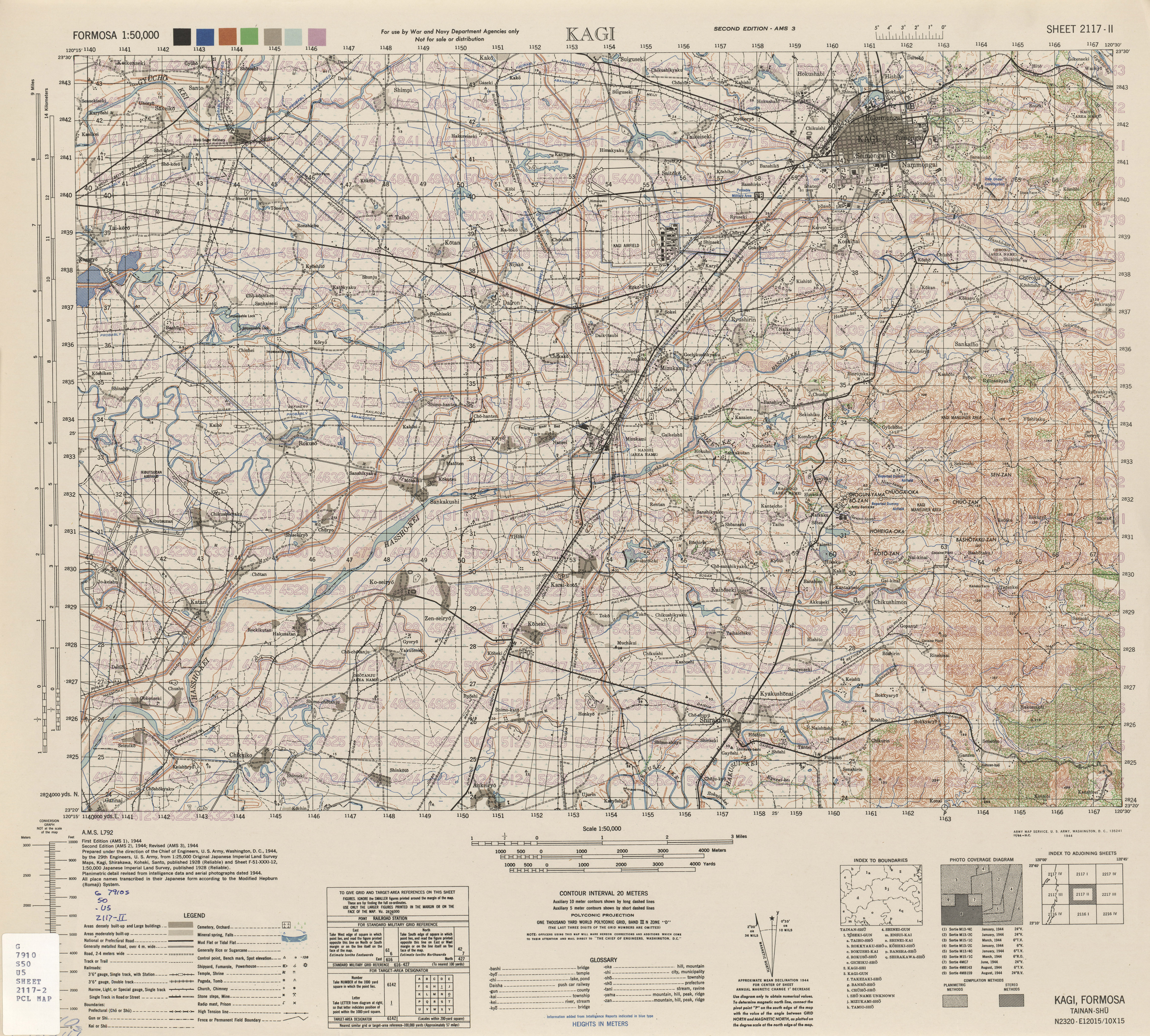
Map of Chiayi (labeled as KAGI) and surrounding area (1944)

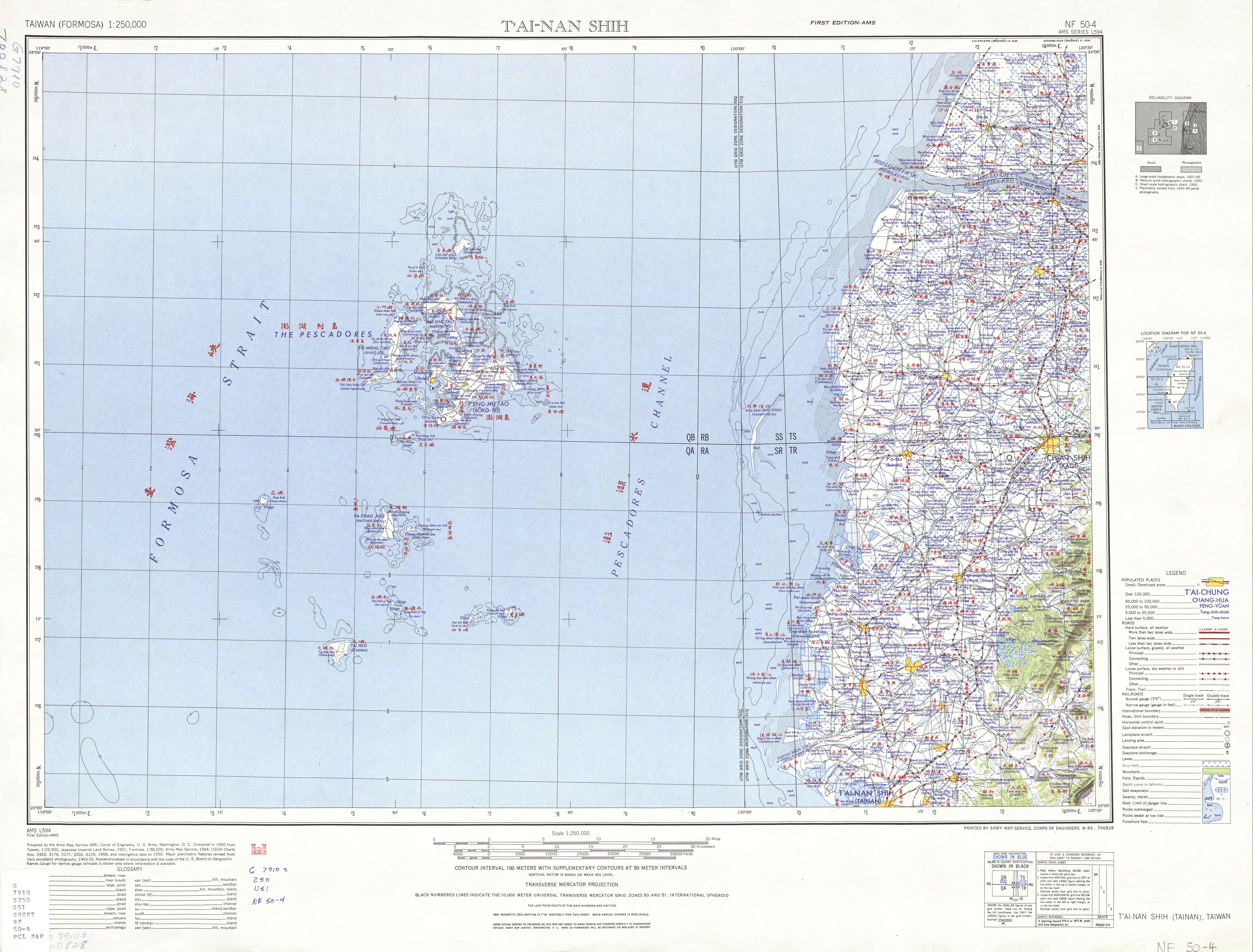
Map of the region including Chiayi (labeled as CHIA-I SHIH (KAGI) 嘉義市) (1950)

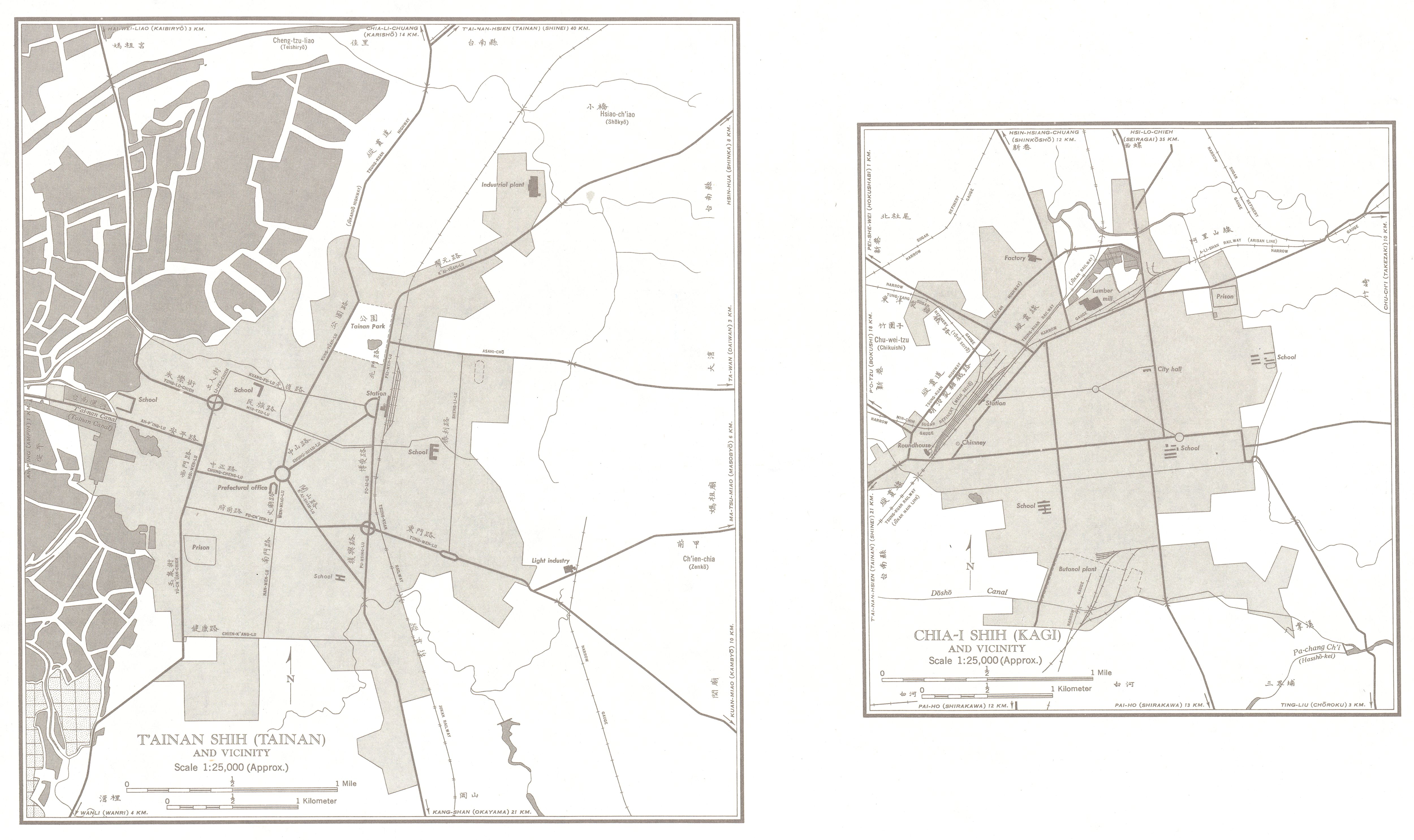
Map of the city of Chiayi (labeled as CHIA-I SHIH (KAGI) 嘉義市) (1950s)

Chiayi City is located on the north side of Chianan Plain, south west of Taiwan Island. On the east side is the Mount Ali, on the west side is the Chiayi Airport, on the north side is the Puzi River and on the south side is the Bazhang River. The distance from east to west of Chiayi City is 15.8 km (9.8 mi) and from north to south is 10.5 km (6.5 mi) with a total area of 60.0256 km^{2} (23.1760 sq mi). Chiayi City is completely surrounded by Chiayi County. Most of Chiayi City land is broad flat fertile plains. The terrain slowly rises from west to east. Chiayi is also one of the closest Taiwanese cities to the Tropic of Cancer, with the latitudinal line lying just south of the city.

=== Climate ===
Chiayi City has a warm humid subtropical climate (Köppen Cwa) that closely borders a true tropical climate. Northeasterly winds during fall and winter mean that rainfall is depressed during that time, while southwesterly winds during summer and the later portion of spring bring most of the year's rainfall, with more than 60% falling from June to August. Humidity is high year-round, even during winter.

Climate data for Chiayi (1991–2020 normals, extremes 1968–present）
Month	Jan	Feb	Mar	Apr	May	Jun	Jul	Aug	Sep	Oct	Nov	Dec	Year
Record high °C (°F)	31.7 (89.1)	33.0 (91.4)	34.1 (93.4)	34.2 (93.6)	37.2 (99.0)	37.0 (98.6)	37.2 (99.0)	36.6 (97.9)	36.7 (98.1)	36.5 (97.7)	33.6 (92.5)	32.5 (90.5)	37.2 (99.0)
Mean daily maximum °C (°F)	22.5 (72.5)	23.0 (73.4)	25.4 (77.7)	28.4 (83.1)	30.9 (87.6)	32.8 (91.0)	33.4 (92.1)	32.8 (91.0)	32.1 (89.8)	30.1 (86.2)	27.6 (81.7)	23.9 (75.0)	28.6 (83.4)
Daily mean °C (°F)	16.8 (62.2)	17.7 (63.9)	20.2 (68.4)	23.5 (74.3)	26.3 (79.3)	28.3 (82.9)	28.9 (84.0)	28.4 (83.1)	27.4 (81.3)	24.9 (76.8)	22.0 (71.6)	18.4 (65.1)	23.6 (74.4)
Mean daily minimum °C (°F)	12.9 (55.2)	14.1 (57.4)	16.2 (61.2)	19.5 (67.1)	22.6 (72.7)	24.7 (76.5)	25.4 (77.7)	25.2 (77.4)	24.0 (75.2)	21.1 (70.0)	18.0 (64.4)	14.2 (57.6)	19.8 (67.6)
Record low °C (°F)	1.8 (35.2)	2.6 (36.7)	2.7 (36.9)	8.2 (46.8)	13.9 (57.0)	17.5 (63.5)	21.7 (71.1)	19.7 (67.5)	17.6 (63.7)	11.5 (52.7)	6.7 (44.1)	0.4 (32.7)	0.4 (32.7)
Average precipitation mm (inches)	27.5 (1.08)	44.9 (1.77)	53.0 (2.09)	86.6 (3.41)	170.0 (6.69)	318.6 (12.54)	387.4 (15.25)	443.8 (17.47)	212.3 (8.36)	30.2 (1.19)	21.5 (0.85)	25.8 (1.02)	1,821.6 (71.72)
Average precipitation days (≥ 0.1 mm)	5.1	5.5	6.8	8.1	10.4	13.8	15.3	17.9	9.4	2.9	3.3	4.1	102.6
Average relative humidity (%)	77.9	79.3	79.3	79.8	79.9	77.5	77.2	80.1	80.1	78.9	78.7	76.8	78.8
Mean monthly sunshine hours	161.4	139.7	157.9	157.0	175.5	186.6	206.4	182.2	186.2	197.0	158.9	159.2	2,068
Source: Central Weather Bureau

== Government ==
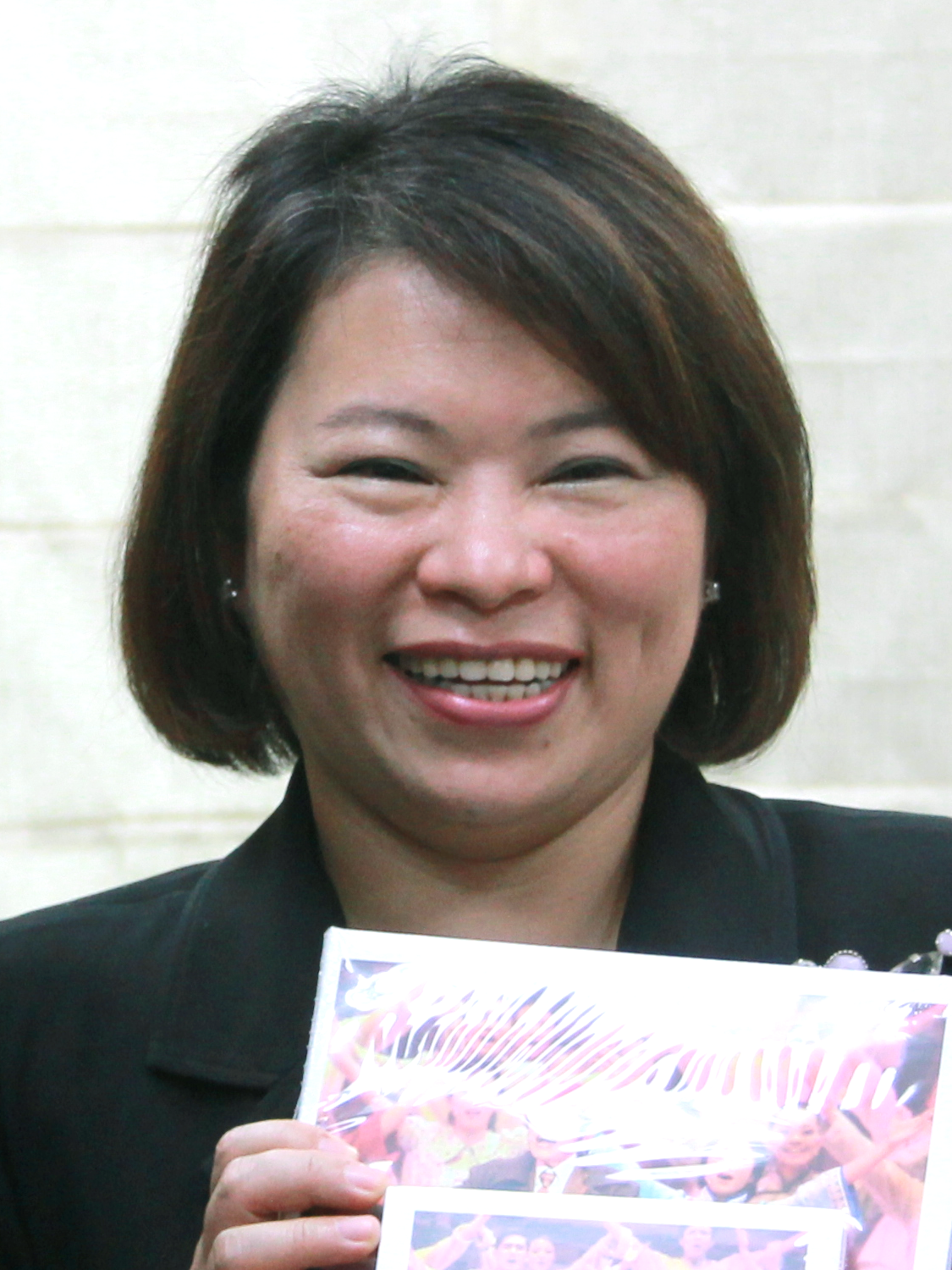
Huang Min-hui, the incumbent Mayor of Chiayi City.

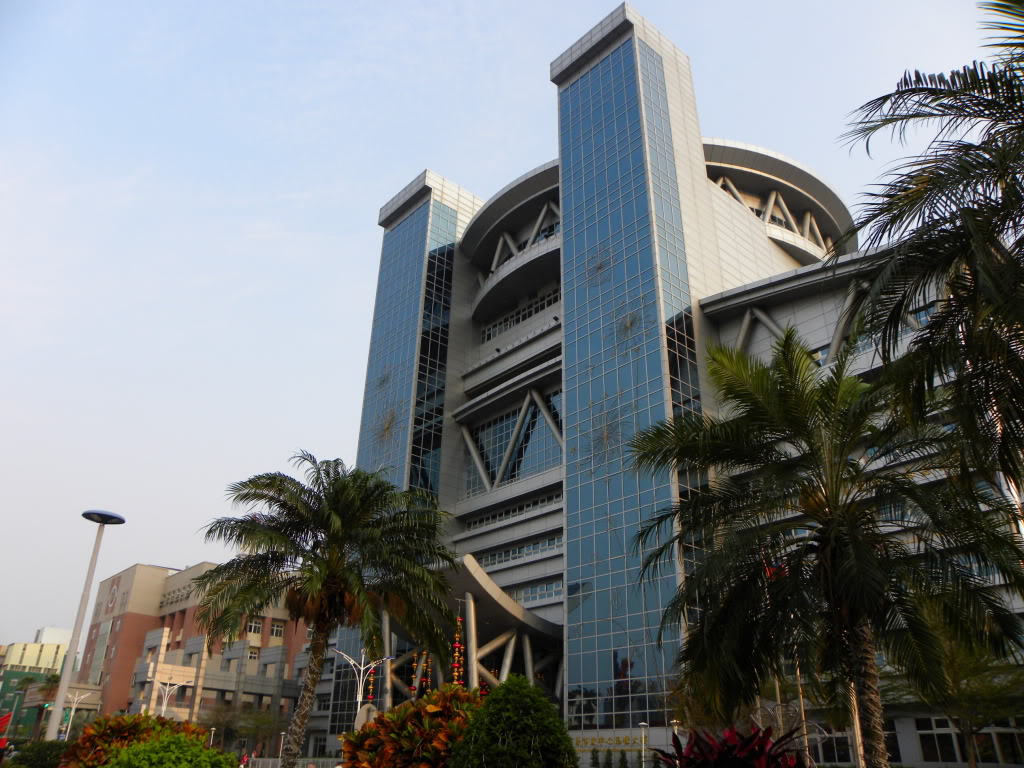
Chiayi City Government

Chiayi City is a provincial city of Taiwan Province of the Republic of China. The city is governed by the Chiayi City Government, while the residence is represented in the Chiayi City Council. The current Mayor of Chiayi City is Huang Min-hui of the Kuomintang.

=== Administrative divisions ===
Chiayi City is divided into two districts. East District is the city seat which houses the Chiayi City Government.

Map	Name	Chinese	Taiwanese	Hakka	Population (2016)	Area (km^{2})
	East	東區	Tang	Tûng	122,877	29.1195
	West	西區	Se	Sî	147,396	30.9061

=== Politics ===
Result of the 2022 mayoral election of Chiayi City

Chiayi City voted one Democratic Progressive Party legislator to be in the Legislative Yuan during the 2020 Taiwanese legislative election. It has historically been a very pan-Green city. During the martial law era, most people of Chiayi supported tangwai politicians. However, the voting gap between the DPP and the KMT has narrowed in recent years. In the 2022 Taiwanese local elections, Chiayi City re-elected Huang Min-hui of Kuomintang to be the mayor.

== Demographics ==
Historical population
Year	Pop.	±%
1985	253,573	—
1990	257,597	+1.6%
1995	261,391	+1.5%
2000	266,183	+1.8%
2005	272,364	+2.3%
2010	272,390	+0.0%
2015	270,366	−0.7%
2020	266,005	−1.6%
Source:"Populations by City and Country in Taiwan" (in Chinese). Ministry of the Interior Population Census. May 2018.

View source data.

== Education ==
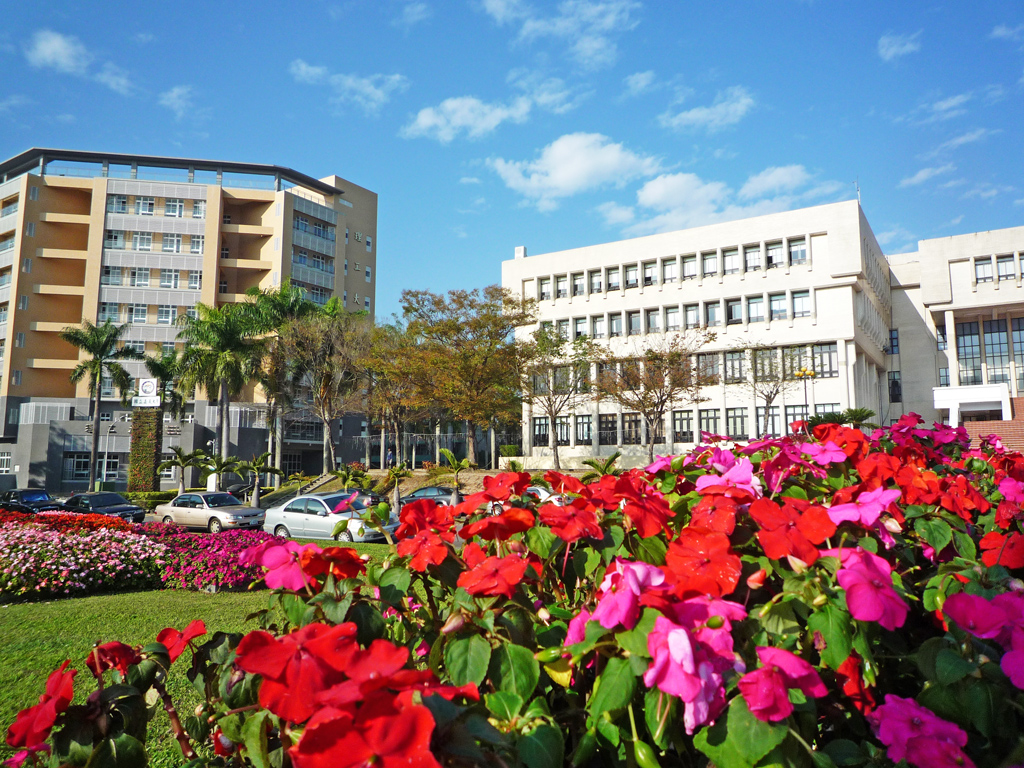
National Chiayi University

- National Chiayi University
- National Chung Cheng University
- Chung Jen College of Nursing, Health Science and Management

== Energy ==
=== Green energy ===
On 17 December 2015, Chiayi City Government launched a program to set up solar panels at schools and offices in the city to reduce green house gases. The program is expected to produce 3.55 million kWh of electricity annually and to help reducing carbon emission by 1,700 tonnes.

== Tourist attractions ==
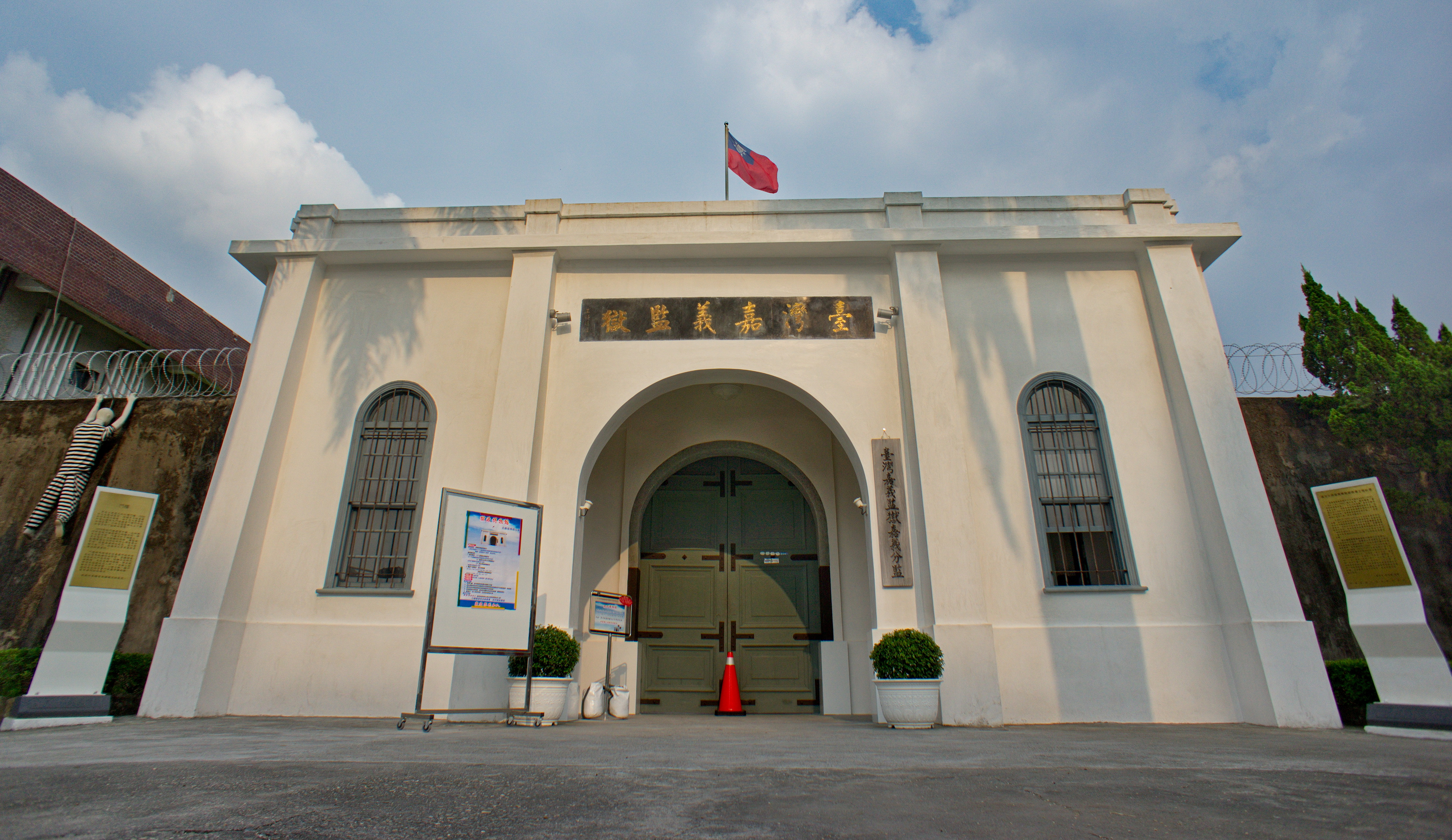
Chiayi Prison Museum

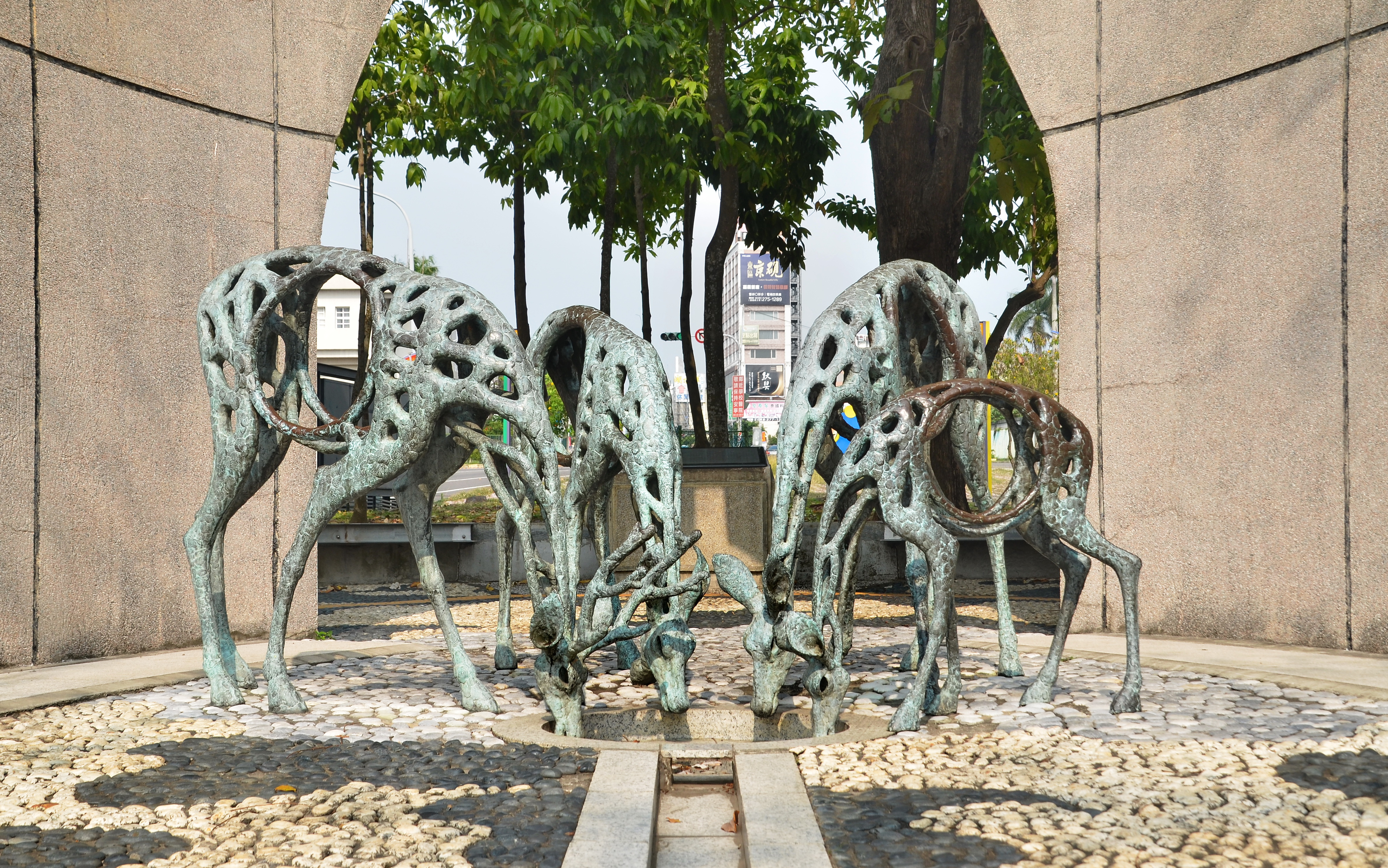
The spotted deer sculpture in the 228 National Memorial Park.

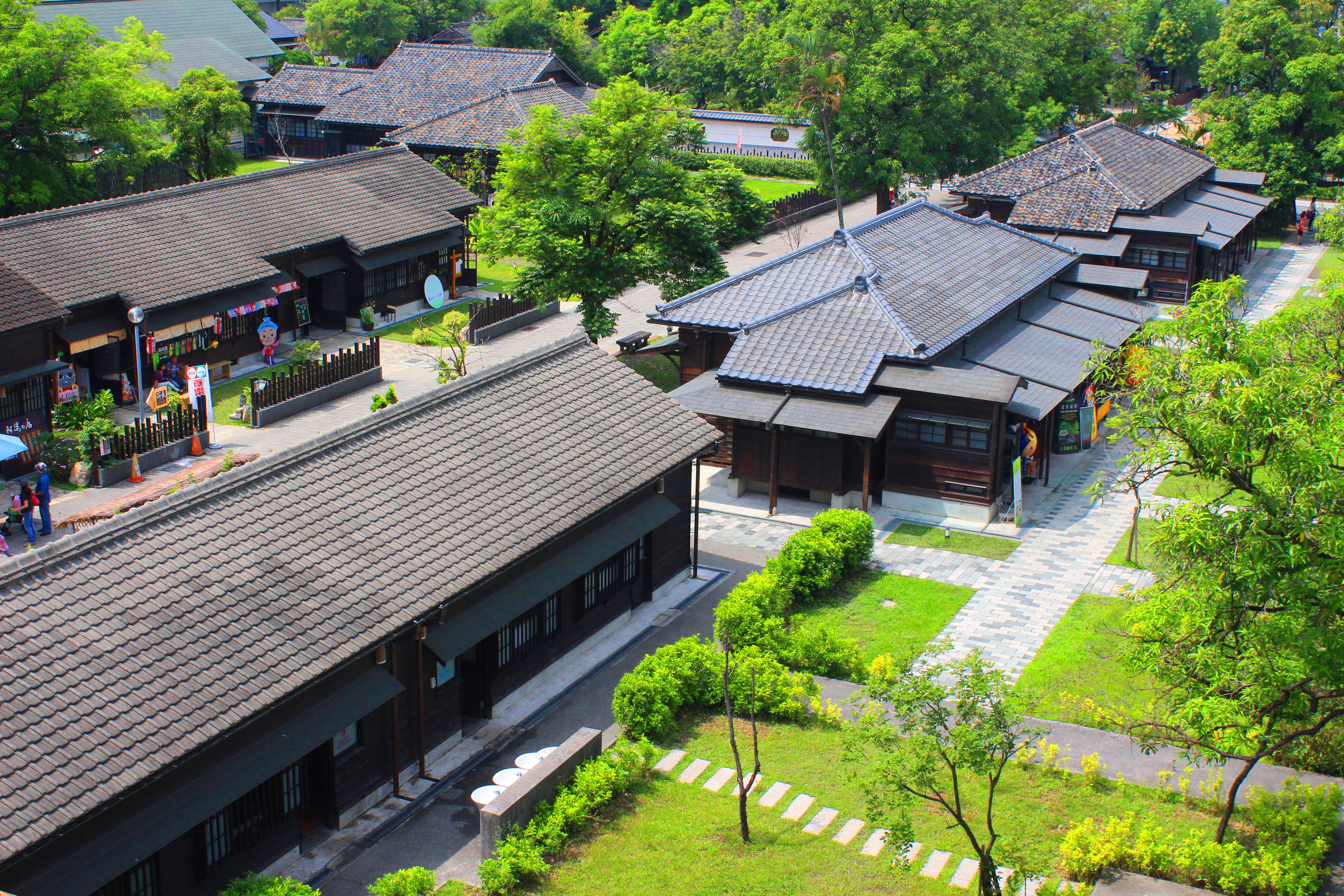
Hinoki Village

- Alishan Forest Railway & Railway Park
- Art Site of Chiayi Railway Warehouse
- Chia-Le-Fu Night Market
- Chiayi Art Museum
- Chiayi Botanical Garden
- Chiayi Cheng Huang Temple
- Chiayi City Municipal Baseball Stadium
- Chiayi Cultural and Creative Industries Park
- Chiayi Jen Wu Temple
- Chiayi Municipal Museum
- Chiayi Park
  - Chiayi Confucian Temple
  - Kagi Shrine
  - Sun-Shooting Tower
- Chiayi Prison Museum
- Hinoki Village
- Lantan Lake
- Museum of Old Taiwan Tiles
- St. John's Cathedral
- Taiwan Hinoki Museum
- Water Source Water Meter Room
- Wenhua Road Night Market
- Historic Archives Building of Chiayi City (史蹟資料館)
- 228 Memorial Park
- National 228 Memorial Park
- Chung Cheng Park
- Chiayi International Band Festival

Chiayi is the city of wind music in Taiwan. The wind music festival started as a local event in 1988, when it was more like a joint performance by local wind music bands. Over the years the festival has become the most anticipated annual event in Chiayi.

== Sports ==
Major sporting events held by Chiayi include:

- 1999 Asian Youth Boys Volleyball Championship
- 2001 Baseball World Cup (Co-hosted with Taipei, New Taipei, and Kaohsiung)
- 2012 Asian Soft Tennis Championship
- 2018 World University Baseball Championship

== Notable residents/natives ==
- Tan Ting-pho (1895–1947), Taiwan famous painter.
- Sow-Hsin Chen (1935–2021), American physicist, Professor.
- Vincent Siew (1939), Taiwanese politician, Vice President of the Republic of China (2008–2012), Vice-Chairman of the Kuomintang.
- Sam Liao (1976), Taiwanese singer-songwriter.
- Huang Min-hui (1959), former mayor of Chiayi City, vice chairperson of Kuomintang, a member of the Legislative Yuan (1999 and 2005).
- Lo Chen-Jung (1961), Taiwanese left-handed baseball pitcher.
- Wu Bai (1968), Taiwanese rock singer.

== Twin towns – sister cities ==
Chiayi is twinned with:

- East Orange, New Jersey, United States (1972)
- Jackson, Mississippi, United States (1972)
- Juneau, Alaska, United States (1977)
- Murray, Utah, United States (1977)
- Bulacan Province, Philippines (1980)
- Martinsburg, West Virginia, United States (1988)
- Syracuse, New York, United States (1995)
- Hsinchu City, Taiwan (2002)

== Transportation ==
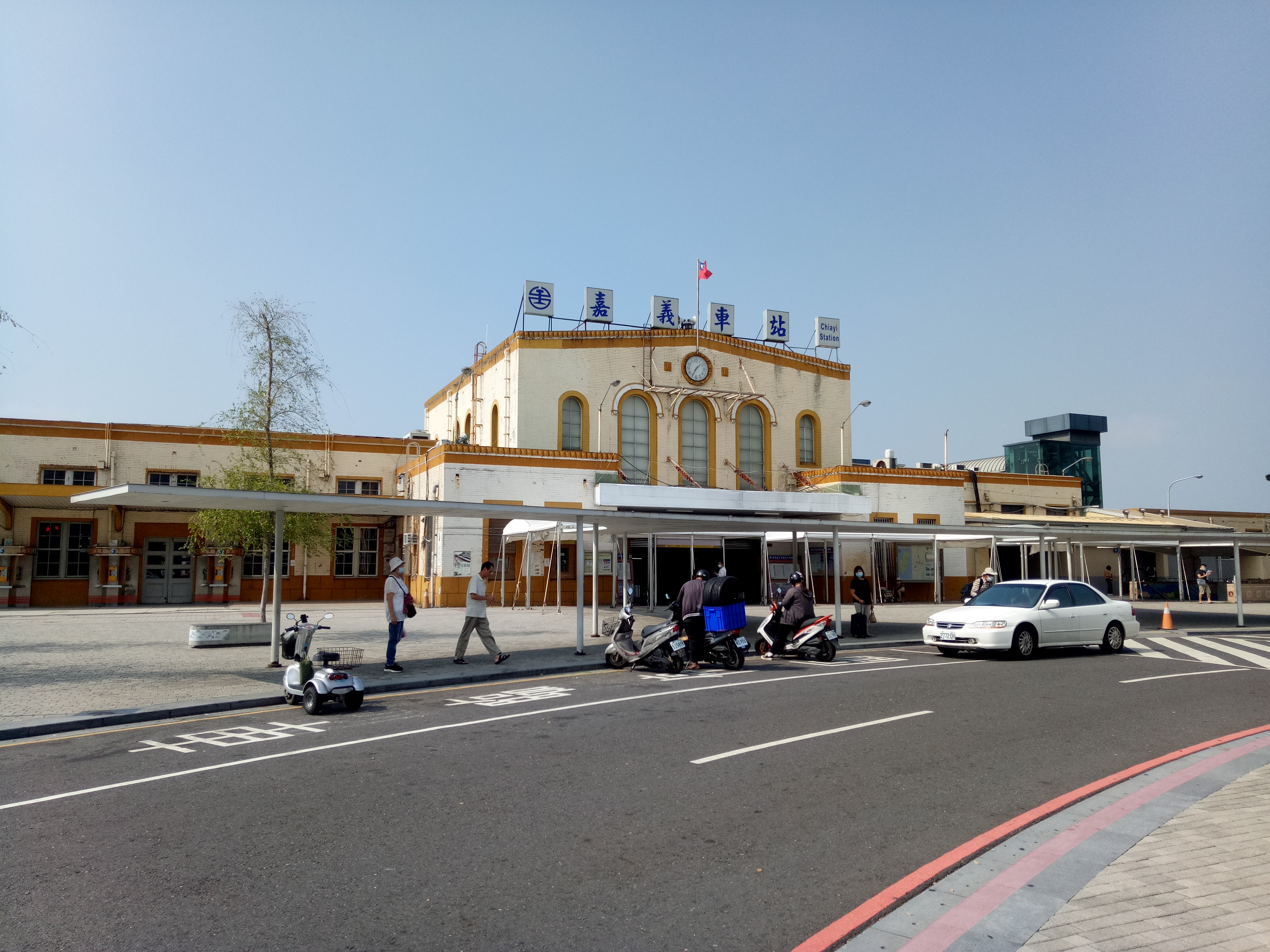
Chiayi Station

=== Rail ===
Chiayi City is served by Chiayi Station and Jiabei Station of Taiwan Railway. Chiayi Station is the starting point for the Alishan Forest Railway. The city is also accessible from THSR Chiayi Station in Chiayi County.

=== Bus ===
Chiayi Bus Rapid Transit connects Chiayi City to Chiayi HSR station in the neighboring Taibao City. Chiayi City Bus serves the urban areas of Chiayi City.

=== Air ===
Chiayi City is served by Chiayi Airport in the neighboring Shuishang Township.

== In popular culture ==
Chiayi City and its street foods, including the famous Chiayi turkey rice, were featured on the Netflix TV series, Street Food, in season 1.

A substantial part of Hou Hsiao-hsien's 1996 movie Goodbye South, Goodbye is set in Chiayi.

== See also ==
- List of mayors of Chiayi
- Chiayi County
