= Chiayi City Bus =

Bus service in Chiayi City, Taiwan

Chiayi City Bus 嘉義市公車
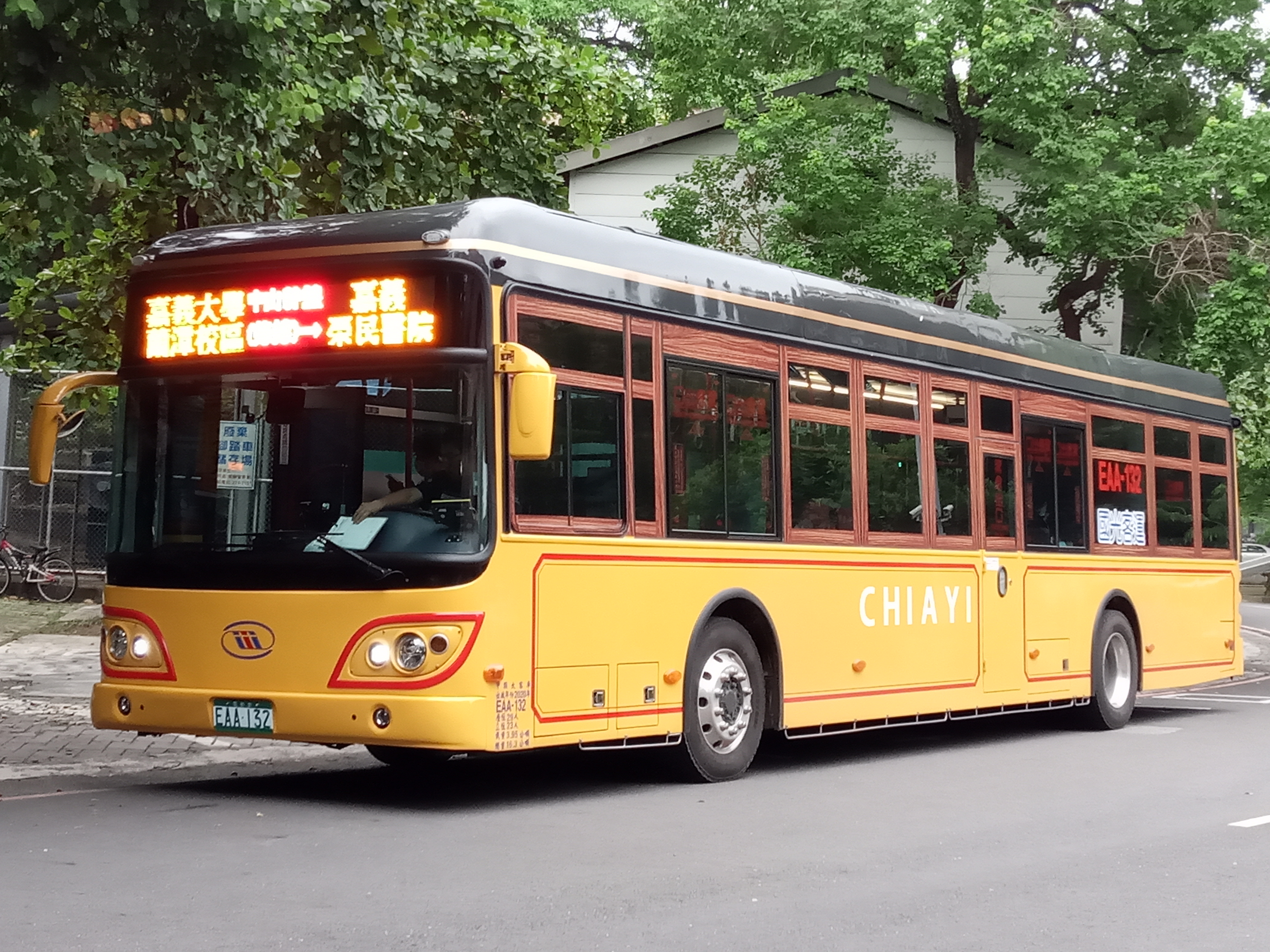
- Zhong-Shan Main Line, a Master MB120NSENon-step bus
- Founded: 1949
- Locale: Chiayi City, Taiwan

Chiayi City Bus
- Chinese: 嘉義市公車
Transcriptions
Standard Mandarin
- Hanyu Pinyin: Jiāyì Shì Gōngchē
Southern Min
- Hokkien POJ: Ka-gī-chhī kong-chhia

Chiayi City Bus is a bus service managed by the Transportation Department, Chiayi City Government and operated by Kuo-Kuang Motor Transportation and J-Cha Transportation in Chiayi City, Taiwan.

== Fares ==
- 12 NTD per segment (free by using IC Card)

== Operators ==
List of Chiayi City Bus Operators
| name | translated name | number of routes running | date established |
|---|---|---|---|
| 國光客運 | Kuo-Kuang Motor Transportation | 7 | June 2001 |
| 捷乘交通 | J-Cha Transportation | 8 | August 1983 |

== History ==
Chiayi City Bus was established in 1949 with Chiayi City Bus Service Administration as its operator. Later on, Chiayi City was downgraded from a provincial city of Taiwan Province to a county-controlled city of Chiayi County. As a consequence, Chiayi City Bus Service Administration was dismissed and Chiayi City Bus was canceled from 1950 to February 1953. From the time February 1953, Chiayi County Government restarted to operate Chiayi City Bus and founded Chiayi County Bus Service Administration in September 1953 as its operator. From the time October, 2014 to May 2015, Chiayi Bus Company, Ltd get the right of management of Chiayi City Bus, which was later taken back by Chiayi County Bus Service Administration.

== Routes ==
- Zhong-Shan Main Line（green）
- Zhong-Shan Main Line A（green A）
- Zhong-Shan Main Line B（green B）
- ZhongXiao-XinMin Main Line（Red）
- ZhongXiao-XinMin Main Line A（Red A）
- Guanglinwojia Route/Chiayi Shuttle Tour Bus（Yellow）
- Guanglinwojia Route A/Chiayi Shuttle Tour Bus A（Yellow A）

== See also ==
- Chiayi City Government
- Chiayi Bus Rapid Transit
