= East District, Chiayi =

District in Chiayi City, Taiwan

Coordinates: 23.488911°N 120.476562°E

East District 東區
- District
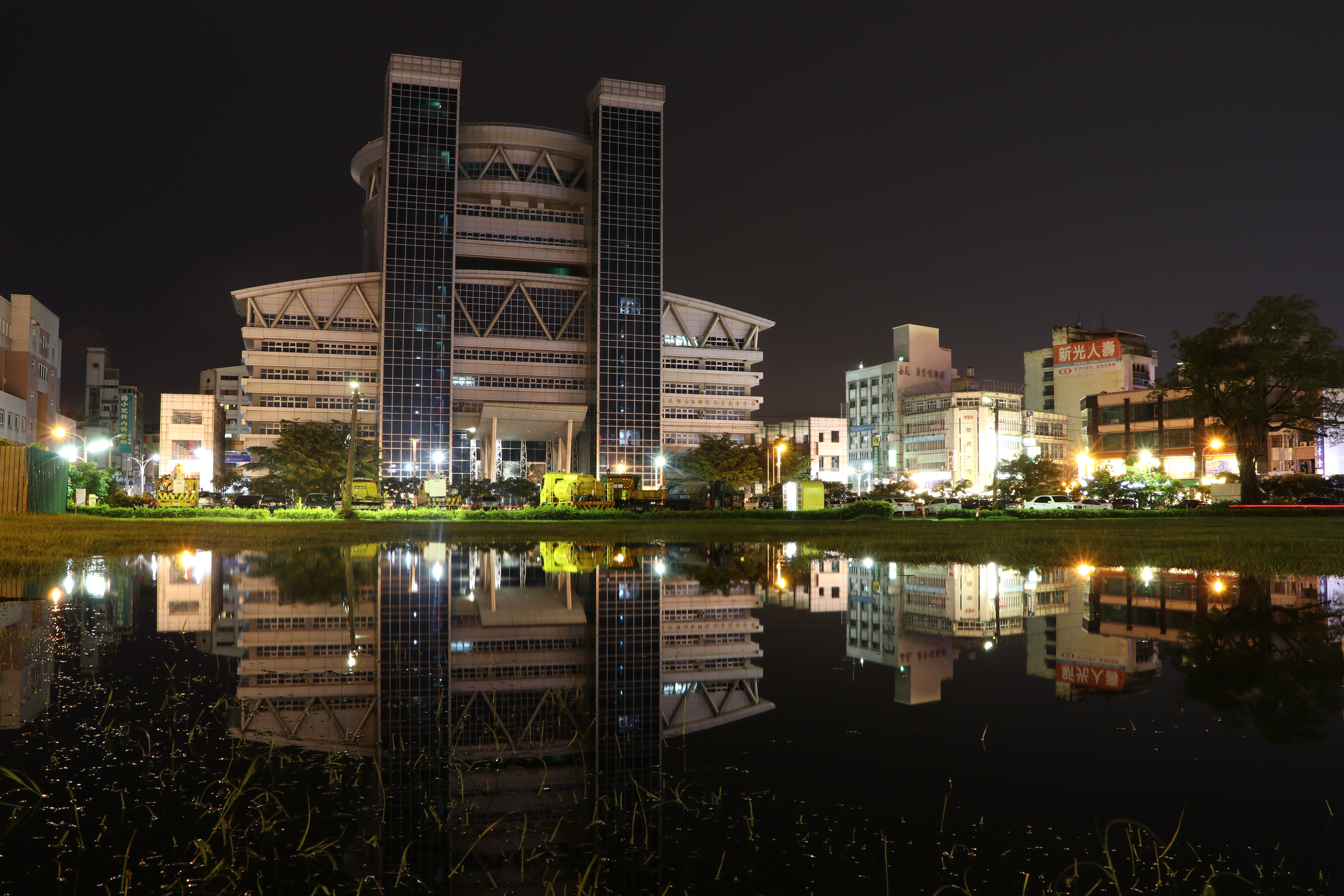
- Chiayi City Hall

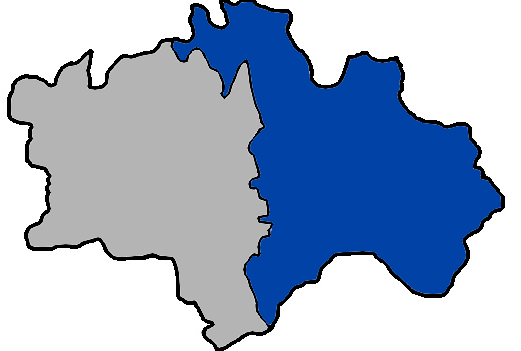
- East District in Chiayi City
- Location: Chiayi City, Taiwan
- Urban villages (里): 39

Government
  - Leader (區長): Sun Shifu (孫世福)

Area
  - Total: 29.1195 km^{2} (11.2431 sq mi)

Population (September 2019)
  - Total: 120,598
  - Density: 4,141.49/km^{2} (10,726.4/sq mi)
- Time zone: UTC+8 (National Standard Time)
- Postal code: 600
- Website: east.chiayi.gov.tw (in Chinese)

East District (Chinese: 東區; pinyin: Dōng Qū; Pe̍h-ōe-jī: Tang-khu) is a district in east Chiayi City, Taiwan. The district is the city seat of Chiayi City.

== History ==
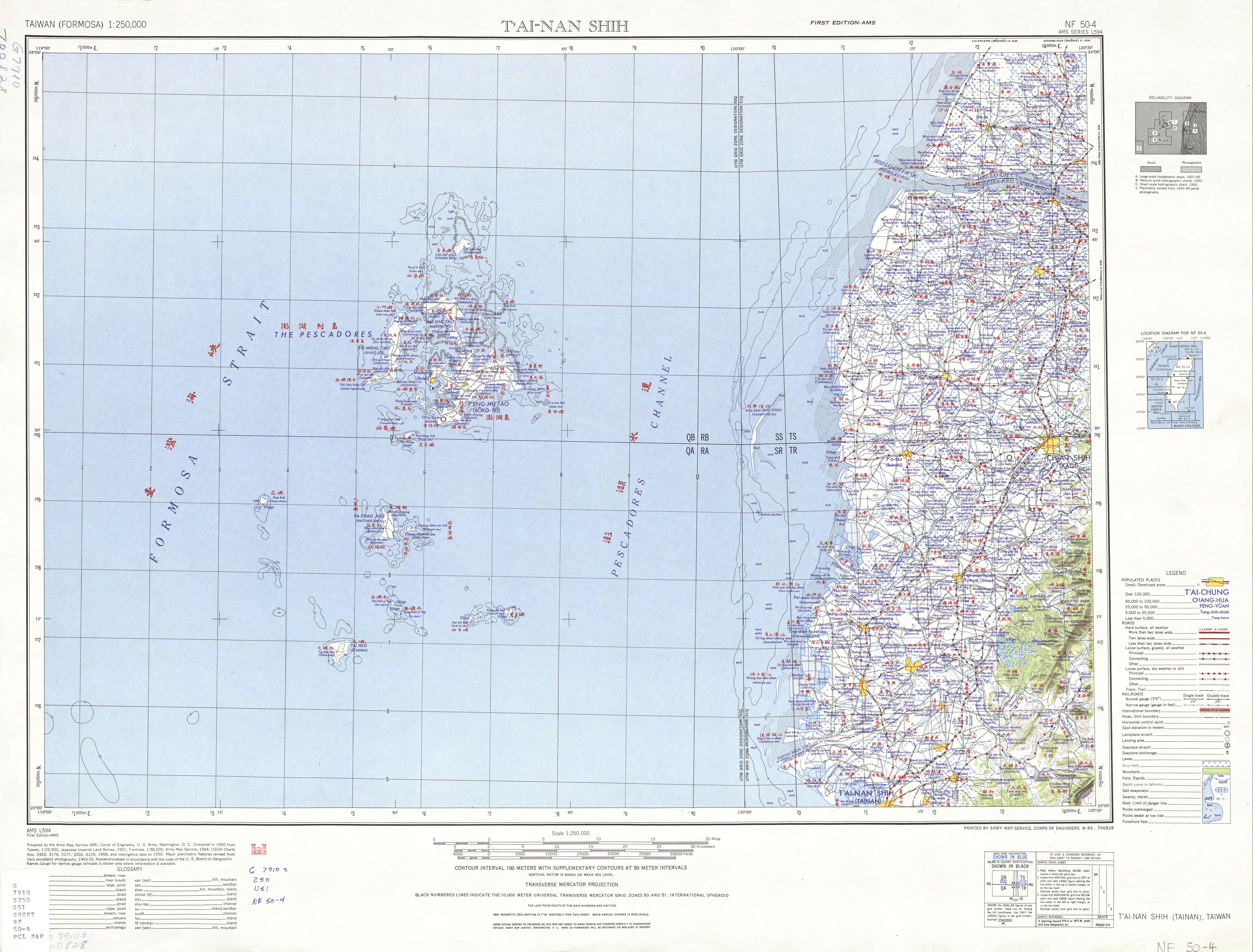
Map of the region including the area of today's East District, Chiayi (1950)

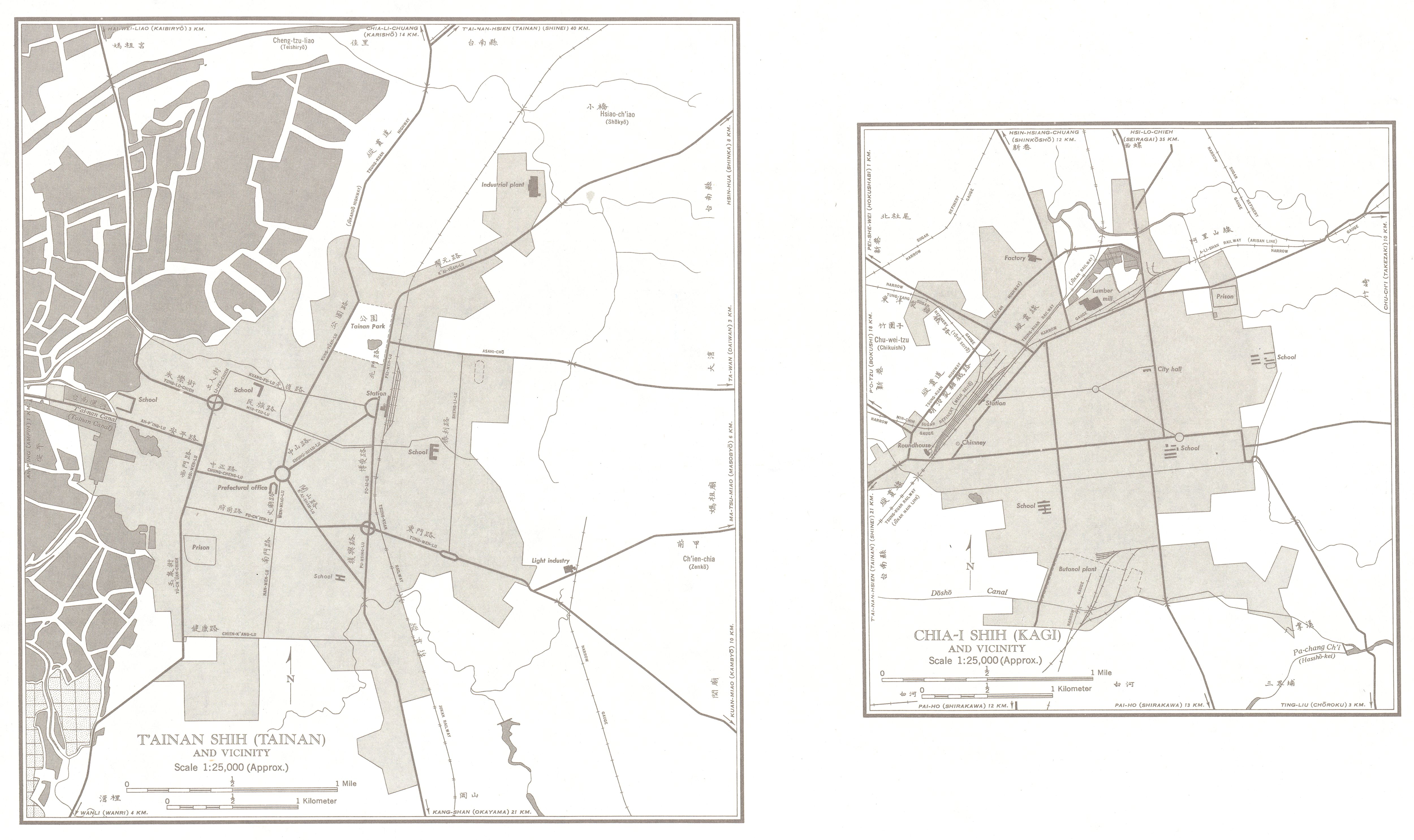
Map of the city including the area of today's East District, Chiayi (1950s)

Chiayi City in 1946–1950

The East District was established on 6 October 1990.

== Administrative divisions ==
East District consists of the following villages:

- (公園聯合里)
  - Duanzhu (短竹里), Lantan (蘭潭里), Dongchuan (東川里), Luliao (鹿寮里), Lucuo (盧厝里), Wenya (文雅里), Wangtian (王田里), Changzhu (長竹里), Houzhuang (後庄里), Xindian (新店里), Zuntou (圳頭里)
- (東南門聯合里)
  - Zhongshan (中山里), Taiping (太平里), Dongxing (東興里), Huanan (華南里), Zhongyang (中央里), Zhaoyang (朝陽里), Minzu (民族里), Guogou (過溝里)
- (新南聯合里)
  - Xinkai (新開里), Xuanxin (宣信里), Xingnan (興南里), Fengnian (豐年里), Fangcao (芳草里), Fang'an (芳安里), Dingliao (頂寮里), Anliao (安寮里), Anye (安業里), Xingcun (興村里), Xing'an (興安里), Xingren (興仁里)
- (北門聯合里)
  - Beimen (北門里), Linsen (林森里), Zhongzhuang (中庄里), Dingzhuang (頂庄里), Yijiao (義教里), Renyi (仁義里), Houhu (後湖里) and Laoteng (荖藤里).

== Government institutions ==
- Chiayi City Hall

== Education ==
- National Chiayi University - Lantan Main Campus and Linsen Campus
- Chung Jen College of Nursing, Health Science and Management

== Tourist attractions ==
- Alishan Forest Railway Garage Park
- Chiayi City Cultural Park
- Chiayi Botanical Garden
- Chiayi Jen Wu Temple
- Chiayi Municipal Museum
- Chiayi Park
  - Chiayi Confucian Temple
  - Kagi Shrine
  - Sun-Shooting Tower
- Chiayi Prison Museum
- Hinoki Village
- Lantan Lake
- St. John's Cathedral
- The First 228 Peace Memorial Monument
- Water Source Water Meter Room

== Transportation ==
- TR Jiabei Station

== See also ==
- Chiayi City
- The First 228 Peace Memorial Monument
