= Chiayi City Government =

Government of Chiayi City, Taiwan

Coordinates: 23.4810°N 120.4536°E

- 嘉義市政府
- Emblem of Chiayi City Government

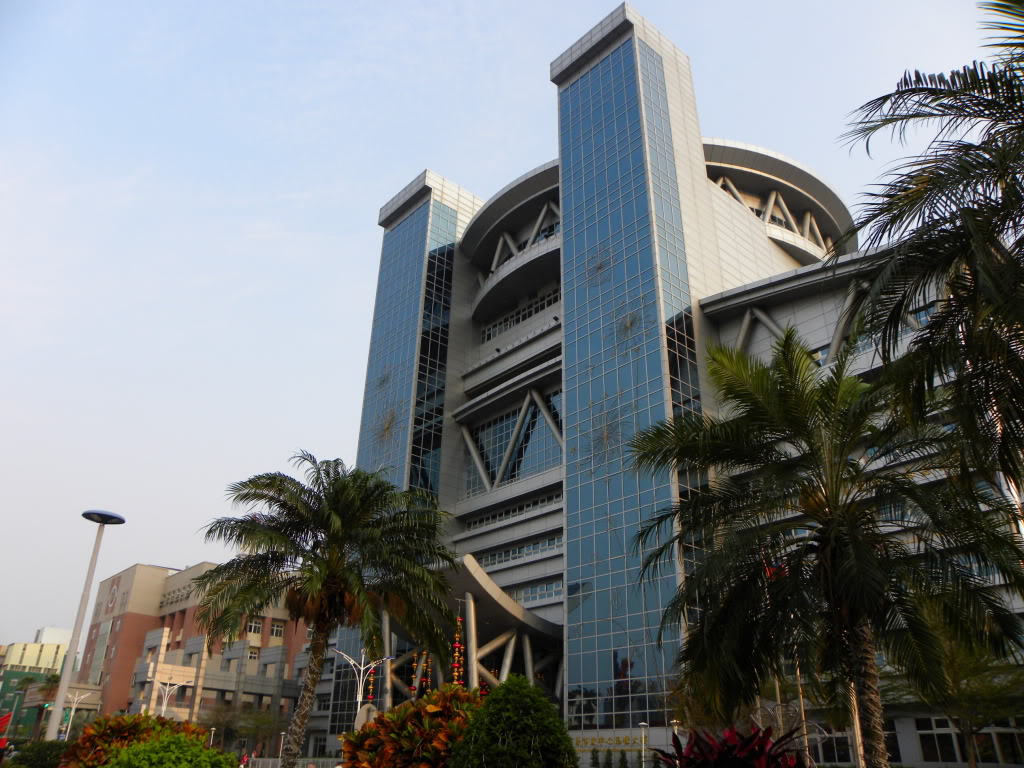
- Chiayi City Hall

Agency overview
- Formed: 1 July 1982
- Jurisdiction: Chiayi City
- Headquarters: No.199, ZhongShan Road, East, Chiayi City
- Agency executive: Huang Min-hui, Mayor
- Child agencies: 14 Subordinate Departments 6 Bureaus 2 Second-Level Agencies 2 District Offices 2 Affiliated Departments 3 Municipal Enterprises
- Website: Official website

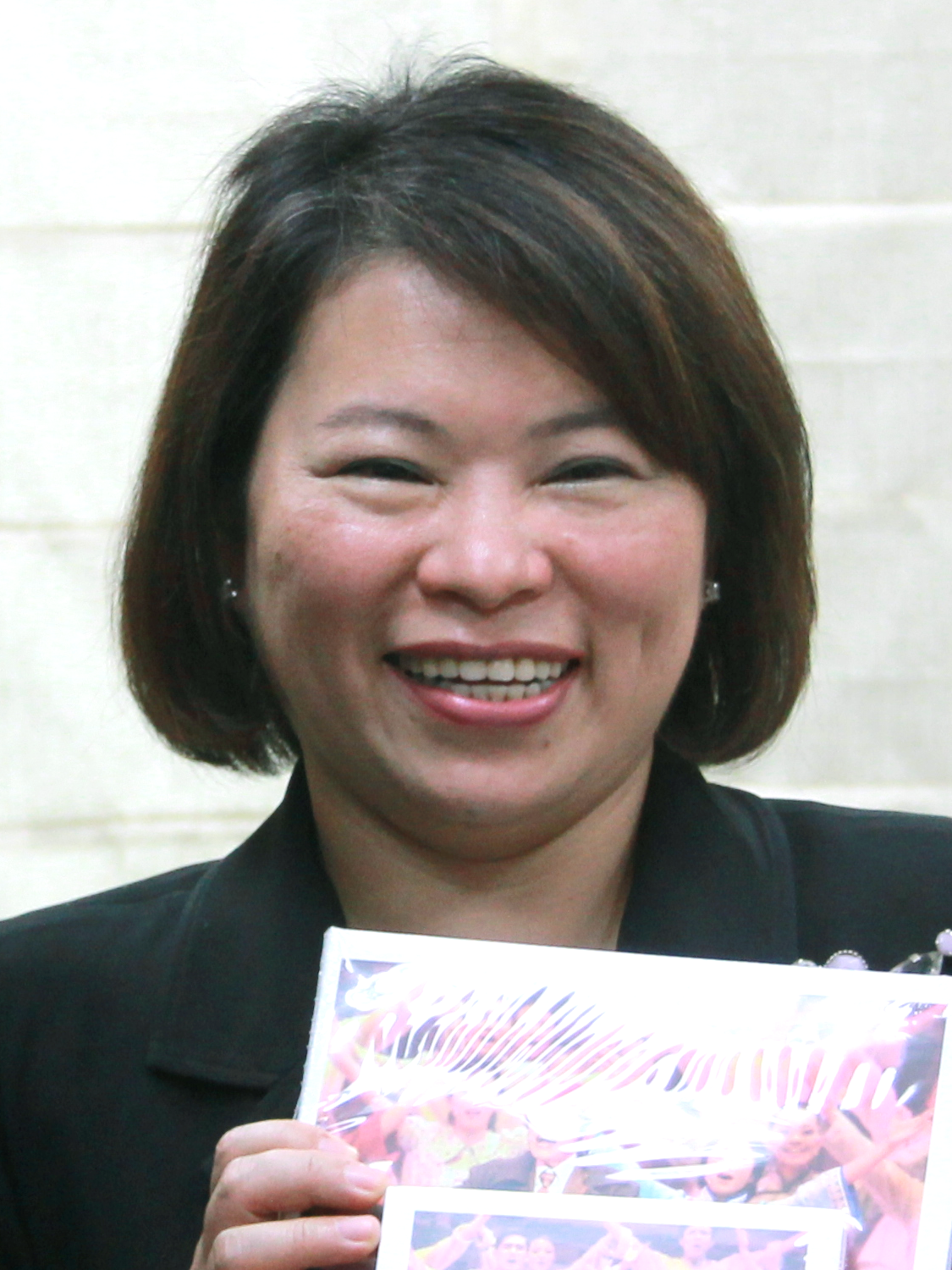
Huang Min-hui, the incumbent Mayor of Chiayi City

Chiayi City Government (traditional Chinese: 嘉義市政府; simplified Chinese: 嘉义市政府; pinyin: Jiāyì Shì Zhèngfǔ) is the municipal government of Chiayi City, Taiwan.

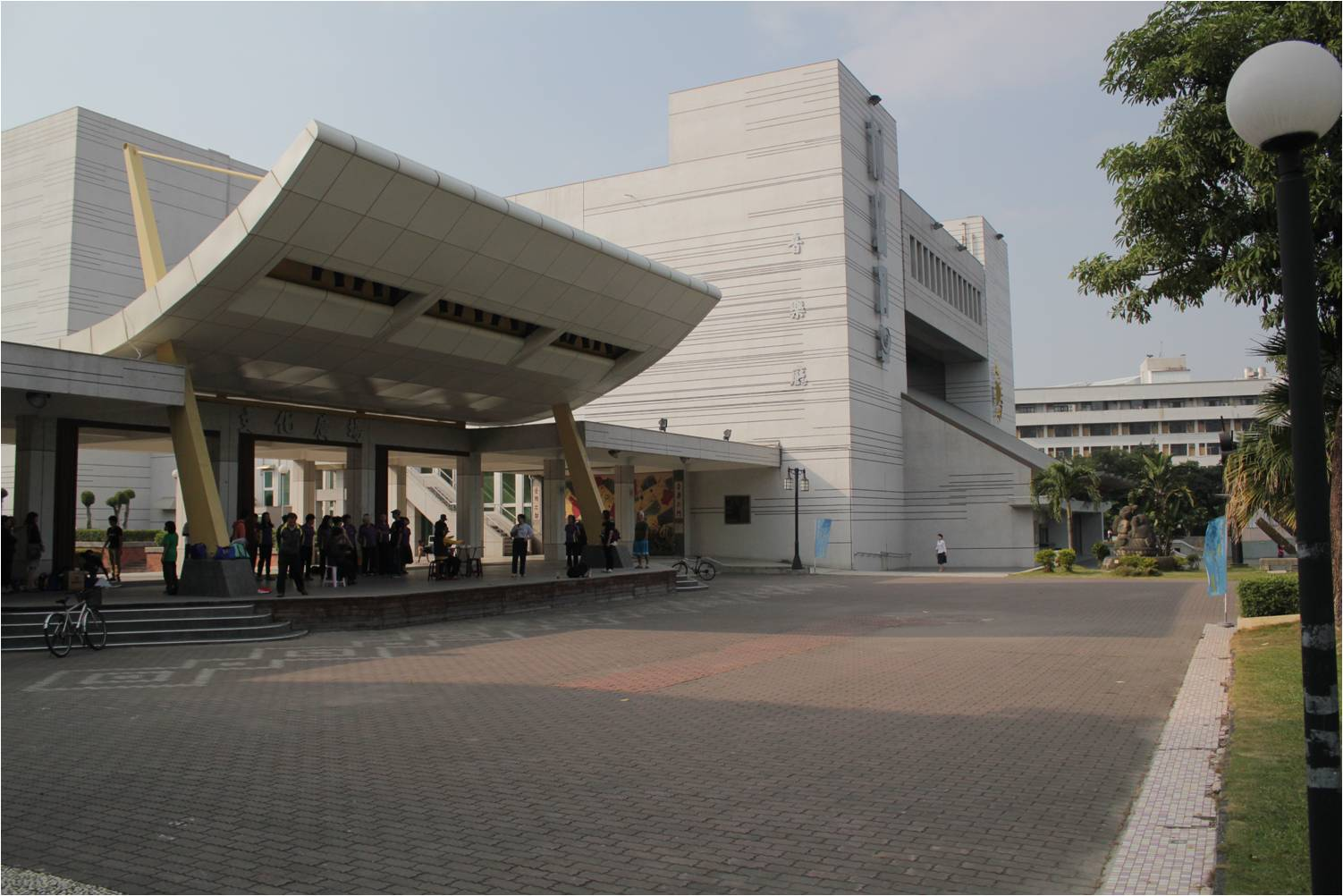
Chiayi Cultural Center

== History ==
=== Kingdom of Tungning (1661–1683) ===
- 1661, Koxinga came to Taiwan and expel Dutch. Founded first Chinese Government in Taiwan. Established Chengtian Fu, Tianxing County and Wannian County. Chiayi City was belonged to Tianxing County.

=== Taiwan under Qing rule (1683–1895) ===
- 1683: Taiwan under the Qing dynasty. 1684, Taiwan Prefecture established: Taiwan County, Fongshan County and Tsulo County. The seat of Tsulo located at Jialixing (modern-day Jiali, Tainan).
- 1704: Tsulo County Government moved to Tsulosan.
- 1786: The anti-Qing Lin Shuangwen rebellion laid siege to Tsulo County ten months. Citizens of Tsulo County helped Qing Army. Name changed from ″Tsulo″ to "Kagi"/"Chia-i" because ″in meritorious service, Tsulo Citizens defended the county to the last."
- 1885: Permission was received officially develop Taiwan into a province.
- 1887: Government reorganized into four prefectures belonging to Fokien-Taiwan Province. Kagi District belonged to Tainan Prefecture, and the district seat was still located in Kagi City.

=== Taiwan under Japanese rule (1895–1945) ===
- 1895: According to the Treaty of Shimonoseki, Formosa ceded to Japan. Kagi under Tainan Ken (臺南縣).
- 1920: Kagi upgraded to Kagi District, Tainan Prefecture.
- 1930: Kagi Town (嘉義街) of Kagi District (嘉義郡) upgraded to Kagi City (嘉義市).

=== the Republic of China (1945–) ===
- 1945, Japanese Empire was lose World War II, Taiwan Province area recovered, and be subordinated to the Republic of China Government. Chiayi City was a three-class provincial city and subordinated to Taiwan Province. It was the first time Provincial Chiayi City. In that time, Chiayi City divide Xindong District (新東區), Xinxi District (新西區), Xinnan District (新南區) and Xinbei District (新北區).
- 1946, Shuishang Township and Taibao Township (today's Taibao City) were merged into Chiayi City. In that time, Chiayi City divide Xindong District (新東區), Xinxi District (新西區), Xinnan District (新南區), Xinbei District (新北區), Taibao District (太保區) and Shuishang District (水上區), total of six districts
- 1950, Chiayi City was degraded to county-level city, it also was the only county-level city in Chiayi County.
- 1972, Chiayi City and Hsinchu City upgraded to Provincial City at the same time, and re-establish Chiayi City Government. There are five provincial-cities in Taiwan Province at that time.
- 1990, because population growth at suburb of Chiayi City, Chiayi City divided East and West two districts.

== City flower ==
Hong Kong Orchid Tree is an evergreen small trees being Caesalpiniaceae. The scientific name is Bauhinia blakeana. It has Bauhinia variegata like appearance and is with large thick leaves and striking purplish red flowers which is like cattleya. Bauhinia blakeana was imported into Taiwan in 1967. Except its specialty of coquettish flower, there is another quality that the same species, like Bauhinia variegata and Cercis chinensis do not have. Its leaves can survive from winter and the florescence is from winter to spring. It is still splendid and vivid while most flowers of small trees are withered. Choose Bauhinia blakeana as the city flower of Chiayi is to symbolize the passion of citizens, the beauty and copiousness of municipal construction. The evergreen leaves symbolize thriving and robust of industry and business. The purpose is to anticipate citizens can work on creating a beautiful and prosperous Chiayi city all together.

== Municipal emblem ==
Chiayi Municipal Emblem

Chiayi City was reformed its status into provincial city on 1 July 1982. The mayor Dr. Shih Sian Syu solicited ideas about the municipal emblem from public then. After assessing, the design from citizen Ming Hong Tsai was selected. The blue background of the emblem symbolizes magnificence and dignity. The charchters of Chiayi city and plum blossom are white which symbolize brightness. The letters “71” are red which symbolize progress and auspicious. The mark of northern tropic is green which symbolize newly born. Plum blossom is Taiwan national flower. “71” represents the reformed date 1 July 1982. The mark of northern tropic tells the geographic position of Chiayi city. The four green lines represent reformation and elevation of city status.

== Organization ==
- Mayor
  - Deputy mayor
    - Secretary-general
      - Senior executive
      - Secretariat
      - Specialist

=== Subordinate departments (Chinese: 處; pinyin: Chù) ===
- Civil Affairs Department (Chinese: 嘉義市政府民政處; pinyin: Jiāyì Shì Zhèngfǔ Mínzhèng Chù)
- Finance Department (Chinese: 嘉義市政府財政處; pinyin: Jiāyì Shì Zhèngfǔ Cáizhèng Chù)
- Economic Affairs Department
- Social Affairs Department
- General Affairs Department
- Civil Service Ethics Department
- Budget, Accounting and Statistics Department
- Education Department
- Public Works Department
- Transportation Department
- Land Administration Department
- Planning Department
- Personnel Department
- Urban Development Department

=== First-level agencies (Chinese: 局; pinyin: Jú) ===
- Police Bureau
- Cultural Affairs Bureau
- Public Health Bureau
- Social Affairs Bureau
- Fire Bureau
- Environmental Protection Bureau
- Local Tax Bureau

=== Second-level agencies ===
- East District Household Registration Office
- West District Household Registration Office
- Land Office
- Social Affairs Department
- Mortuary Service Office
- Chiayi City Stadium
- Public Market

=== District office ===
- East District Office
- West District Office

=== Affiliated unit ===
- East District Health Center
- West District Health Center

=== Municipal enterprises ===
- Chiayi Fish Market Co., Ltd
- Fruit and Vegetable Wholesale Market of Chiayi City Co., Ltd
- Chiayi City Meat Market Co., Ltd

=== Municipal schools ===
==== Junior high school ====
- Lantan Junior High School
- Nanxing Junior High School
- Da-ye Junior High School
- Beixing Junior High School
- Minsheng Junior High School
- Yushan Junior High School
- Beiyuan Junior High School

==== Elementary school ====
- Lantan Elementary School
- Datong Elementary School
- Shixian Elementary School
- Minzu Elementary School
- Beiyuan Elementary School
- Zhihang Elementary School
- Bo'ai Elementary School
- Yuren Elementary School
- Linsen Elementary School
- Xuanxin Elementary School
- Chuiyang Elementary School
- Chongwen Elementary School
- Xingjia Elementary School
- Jingzhong Elementary School
- Xing'an Elementary School
- Gangping Elementary School
- Wenya Elementary School

==== Municipal kindergartens ====
- Chiayi Municipal Wufeng Kindergarten
- Chiayi Municipal Fuguo Kindergarten
- Attached Kindergarten, Beiyuan Elementary School
- Attached Kindergarten, Datong Elementary School
- Attached Kindergarten, Lantan Elementary School
- Attached Kindergarten, Minzu Elementary School
- Attached Kindergarten, Shixian Elementary School
- Attached Kindergarten, Zhihang Elementary School
- Attached Kindergarten, Yuren Elementary School
- Attached Kindergarten, Linsen Elementary School
- Attached Kindergarten, Chuiyang Elementary School
- Attached Kindergarten, Bo'ai Elementary School
- Attached Kindergarten, Jingzhong Elementary School

== List of mayors ==
| Term | Name | Office | Political party |
|---|---|---|---|
| 1 | Hsu Shih-hsien (許世賢) | 1 July 1982 – 1 July 1983 | Independent |
| Acting | Chiang Ching-lin (江慶林) | 1 July 1983 – 15 December 1983 | Kuomintang |
| By-election | Chang Po-ya (張博雅) | 15 December 1983 – 20 December 1985 | Independent |
| 2 | Chang Po-ya (張博雅) | 20 December 1985 – 20 December 1989 | Independent |
| 3 | Chang Wen-ying (張文英) | 20 December 1989 – 20 December 1993 | Independent |
| 4 | Chang Wen-ying (張文英) | 20 December 1993 – 20 December 1997 | Independent |
| 5 | Chang Po-ya (張博雅) | 20 December 1997 – 22 May 2000 | Independent |
| Acting | Chen Li-chen (陳麗貞) | 22 May 2000 – 20 December 2001 | Independent |
| 6 | Chen Li-chen (陳麗貞) | 20 December 2001 – 30 March 2003 | Independent |
| 6 | Chen Li-chen (陳麗貞) | 30 March 2003 – 20 December 2005 | Democratic Progressive Party |
| 7 | Huang Min-hui (黃敏惠) | 20 December 2005 – 20 December 2009 | Kuomintang |
| 8 | Huang Min-hui (黃敏惠) | 20 December 2009 – 25 December 2014 | Kuomintang |
| 9 | Twu Shiing-jer (涂醒哲) | 25 December 2014 – 25 December 2018 | Democratic Progressive Party |
| 10 | Huang Min-hui (黃敏惠) | 25 December 2018 – Incumbent | Kuomintang |

== Access ==
Chiayi City Hall is accessible within walking distance south of Beimen Station of the Alishan Forest Railway.

== See also ==
- Chiayi City Council
