= Wang Mei-hui =

Taiwanese politician (born 1965)

Wang Mei-hui MLY
- 王美惠
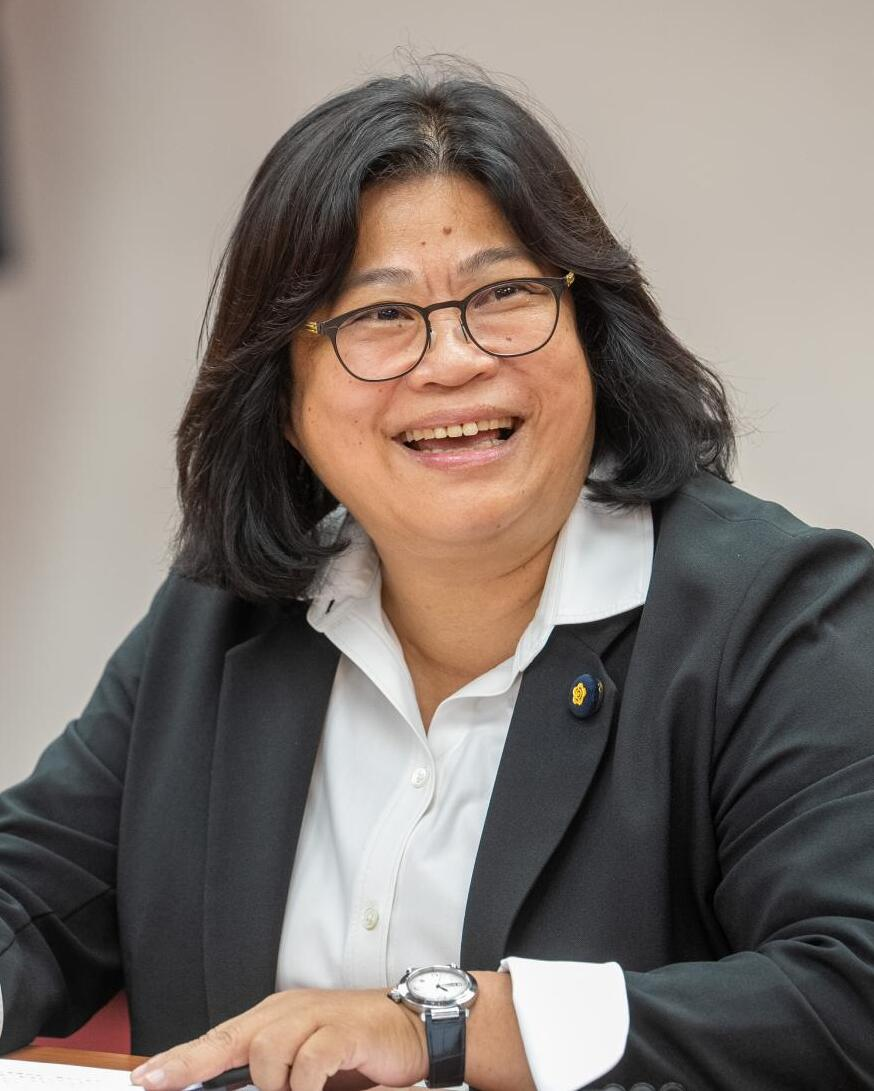
- Wang in 2024

Member of the Legislative Yuan
- Incumbent
- Assumed office 1 February 2020
- Preceded by: Lee Chun-yi
- Constituency: Chiayi City

Chiayi City Councillor
- In office 20 December 2005 – 31 January 2020
- Constituency: 2nd Constituency (West District)

Personal details
- Born: April 15, 1965 (age 61) Chiayi, Chiayi County, Taiwan
- Party: Democratic Progressive Party
- Education: Tatung Institute of Commerce and Technology (BA); National Chiayi University (MBA)

Wang Mei-hui (Chinese: 王美惠; pinyin: Wáng Měihuì; born 15 April 1965) is a Taiwanese politician and member of the Democratic Progressive Party who has served in the Legislative Yuan since 2020. Before being elected to the Legislative Yuan, Wang was a member of the Chiayi City Council from 2005 to 2020.

== Early life and education ==
Wang was born in Chiayi on 15 April 1965. She graduated from Tatung Institute of Commerce and Technology and earned a Master of Business Administration (M.B.A.) from National Chiayi University.

Wang Meihui was first elected for the Chiayi City Council in 2005 and was re-elected for four terms.

In April 2019, Wang ran in a primary against then-legislator Lee Chun-yi for the Democratic Progressive Party nomination for the Chiayi City Constituency. Wang Mei-hui won the primary election with a vote share of 34.33%, and was then nominated by the Democratic Progressive Party to run for the Legislative Council election.

== Electoral history ==
Year	Election	District	Party	Votes	Percentage	Elected	Notes
2005	7th Chiayi City Council Election	Chiayi City 2nd Constituency (West District)	Democratic Progressive Party	4,503	6.34%		
2009	8th Chiayi City Council Election	Chiayi City 2nd Constituency (West District)	Democratic Progressive Party	7,647	10.73%		
2014	9th Chiayi City Council Election	Chiayi City 2nd Constituency (West District)	Democratic Progressive Party	8,261	10.30%		Highest number of votes in Chiayi City
2018	1010th Chiayi City Council Election	Chiayi City 2nd Constituency (West District)	Democratic Progressive Party	8,007	10.27%		Highest number of votes in Chiayi City
2020	10th Taiwanese Legislative Yuan Election	Chiayi City Constituency	Democratic Progressive Party	80,333	50.20%		
2024	11th Taiwanese Legislative Yuan Election	Chiayi City Constituency	Democratic Progressive Party	78,069	50.64%		

== Political stances ==
=== Support for the Hong Kong anti-extradition bill movement ===
In 2019, protests against proposed amendments to Hong Kong’s extradition law drew international attention. Taiwan’s government issued statements criticizing the Hong Kong government’s response to the demonstrations and emphasizing human rights concerns. On 25 May 2020, Wang expressed support for the protests in a Facebook post and called for politicians to pay greater attention to developments in Hong Kong.

=== Support for the renaming of China Airlines ===
In April 2020, the COVID-19 pandemic led Taiwan to donate masks to many countries around the world. However, due to the name of China Airlines, planes from China Airlines were repeatedly mistaken for planes from the People's Republic of China. This incident sparked domestic discussions about renaming China Airlines.

On 14 April 2020, Wang Mei-hui expressed her support for China Airlines to change its name and asked relevant ministries and committees to discuss it as soon as possible. In response to Premier Su Tseng-chang's proposal of "not changing the name first, but painting Taiwan on the fuselage", Wang said, "It may cause foreigners to have the fallacy of "Taiwan is a province of China"".

=== Opposition to the nomination of Justin Huang to the Control Yuan ===
On 18 June 2020, the government reported that President Tsai Ing-wen was preparing to nominate former Taitung County Mayor Justin Huang as the Vice President of the 6th Control Yuan. Many Democratic Progressive Party legislators and party and government figures expressed their disapproval due to his conviction for bribery in 2016.

On 19 June, Wang Mei-hui expressed strong opposition to the nomination and criticized the nomination of Justin Huang as "ridiculous". Wang emphasized that the candidate for the Vice President of the Control Yuan should be based on merit and ability, and that the Control Yuan was in line with social expectations and there was no need to nominate a controversial person. Wang Meihui vowed to cast a no vote if Huang was nominated to the Control Yuan.

On 20 June, Justin Huang withdrew from his nomination as the Vice President of the 6th Control Yuan.
