= CYCC =

CYCC may refer to:

- Chiayi City Council, a local council in Taiwan
- The ICAO code for Cornwall Regional Airport
- CYCC (gene), see List of notable genes
