= Valentin Amrhein =

German / Swiss professor of zoology (born 1971)

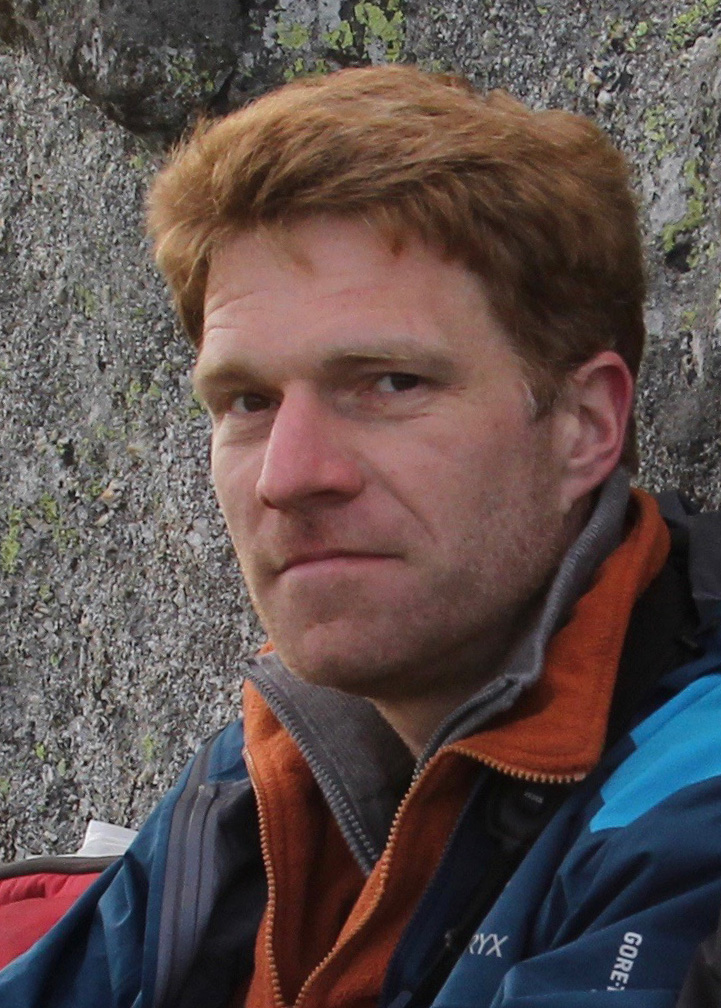
- Born: 1 April 1971 (age 54); Lübeck, Germany
- Citizenship: German-Swiss
- Occupation(s): Zoologist; Science journalist
- Organizations: University of Basel; Swiss Ornithological Institute Sempach
- Known for: Ornithologist; Critic of significance thresholds

Valentin Amrhein (born 1 April 1971 in Lübeck) is a German-Swiss professor of zoology at the University of Basel and science journalist. Together with Sander Greenland and others, he is a critic of significance thresholds in science and he draws attention to misunderstandings of p-values. He is author of a comment in the journal Nature on statistical significance that had the highest online attention score of all research outputs ever screened by Altmetric.

== Life ==
Amrhein spent his school years in Bonn and studied biology at the University of Basel between 1992 and 1999. He completed his PhD on the nightingale in 2004, followed by a research stay at the University of Oslo. Since 2004 he has been head of the research station Petite Camargue Alsacienne. Since 2006, Amrhein has taught ornithology, conservation biology and statistics at the Zoological Institute of the University of Basel. In addition, he works as a science journalist, and from 2012 to 2016 he was head of communications at the Swiss Academies of Arts and Sciences. Since 2017 he has been editor of the journal Ornithologischer Beobachter at the Swiss Ornithological Institute Sempach.

Amrhein is married and father of three daughters. During his studies he played violin in various orchestras and chamber music formations.

== Key publications ==
- Amrhein, V.; Greenland, S. & McShane, B. (2019). "Retire statistical significance" (print title), "Scientists rise up against statistical significance" (online title). Nature.
- Amrhein, V.; Trafimow, D. & Greenland, S. (2019). "Inferential statistics as descriptive statistics: there is no replication crisis if we don't expect replication". The American Statistician.
- Amrhein, V. & Greenland, S. (2018). "Remove, rather than redefine, statistical significance". Nature Human Behaviour.
- Amrhein, V.; Korner-Nievergelt, F. & Roth, T. (2017). "The earth is flat (p > 0.05): significance thresholds and the crisis of unreplicable research". PeerJ.
- Roth, T.; Plattner, M. & Amrhein, V. (2014). "Plants, birds and butterflies: short-term responses of species communities to climate warming vary by taxon and with altitude". PLOS ONE.
- Amrhein, V.; Korner, P. & Naguib, M. (2002). "Nocturnal and diurnal singing activity in the nightingale: correlations with mating status and breeding cycle". Animal Behaviour.
