= 2001–02 Taiwanese local elections =

- 1 December 2001 – 7 December 2002 (Note: 2001-12-01: magistrates of counties and mayors of cities; 2002-01-26: councillors in county/city councils and mayors of township/cities; 2002-06-08: representatives in township/city councils and villages chiefs (all except in Taipei City); 2002-12-07: mayors and councillors of special municipalities)

25 magistrates/mayors and others (Note: 993 councillors; 319 township/city mayors; 3,717 township/city council representatives; 7,360 village chiefs (all except in Taipei City); Figures in this infobox are for magistrate/mayor elections unless otherwise noted. Special municipalities are counted with counties/cities despite being counted separately in official statistics)
- Registered: 15,875,304
- Turnout: 67.30% ▼1.52 pp
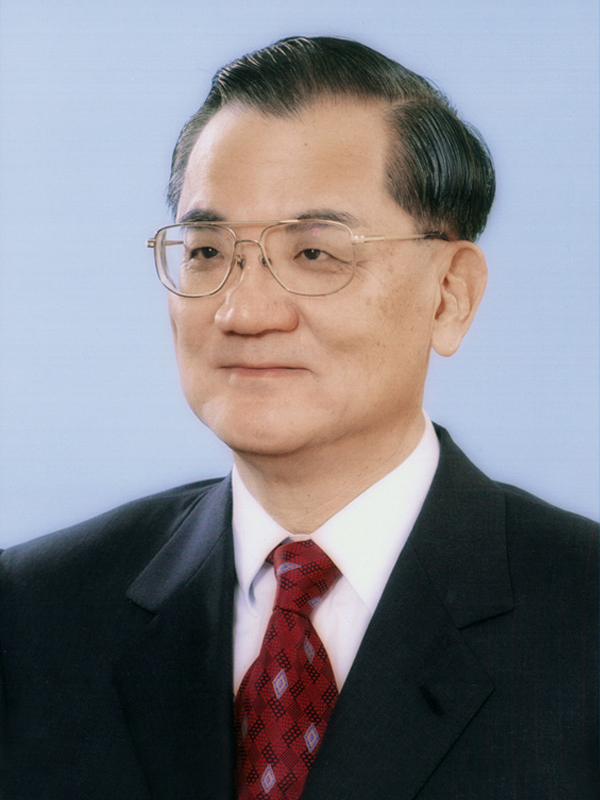

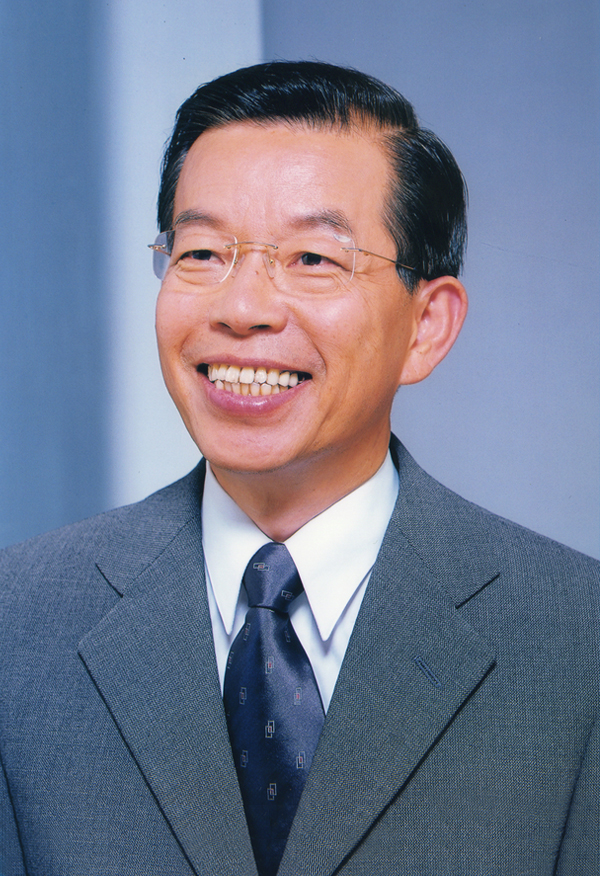

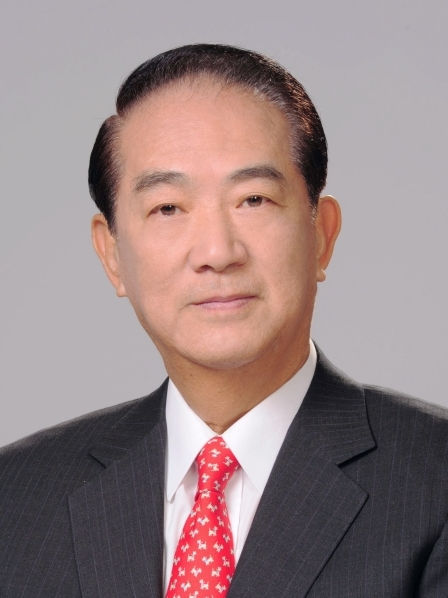

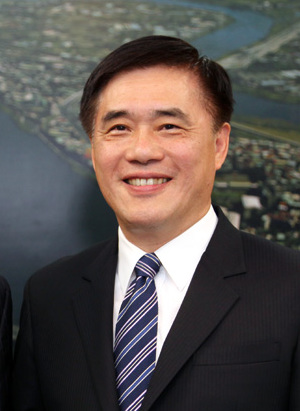
	First party	Second party
Leader	Lien Chan	Frank Hsieh
Party	KMT	DPP
Leader since	20 March 2000	20 April 2000
Last election	9 seats, 43.95%	13 seats, 44.14%
Seats won	10	10
Seat change	▲1	▼3
Popular vote	4,184,865	4,674,904
Percentage	39.75%	44.40%
Swing	▼4.21 pp	▲0.26 pp
Councillors	412	178
Township/city mayors	195	28
	Third party	Fourth party
Leader	James Soong	Hau Lung-pin
Party	People First	New
Leader since	31 March 2000	March 2000
Last election	Did not stand (Note: Not yet established)	0 seats, 1.60%
Seats won	2	1
Seat change	▲2	▲1
Popular vote	197,707	834,956
Percentage	1.88%	7.93%
Swing	New party	▲6.33 pp
Councillors	64	8
Township/city mayors	4	0
- Elected magistrate/mayor party by seat

Local elections were held in Taiwan on 1 December 2001 to elect magistrates of counties and mayors of cities, on 26 January 2002 to elect councillors in county/city councils and mayors of townships and cities, on 8 June 2002 to elect representatives in township/city councils and village chiefs (all except in Taipei City), and on 7 December 2002 to elect mayors and councillors of special municipalities.

== Magistrate/mayor elections in counties/cities ==
Taiwanese county magistrates and city mayoral elections, 2001
County/City	Winning candidate	Party
Changhua County	Wong Chin-chu	Democratic Progressive Party
Chiayi City	Chen Li-chen	Independent
Chiayi County	Chen Ming-wen	Democratic Progressive Party
Hsinchu City	Lin Junq-tzer	Kuomintang
Hsinchu County	Cheng Yung-chin	Kuomintang
Hualien County	Chang Fu-hsing	Kuomintang
Kaohsiung County	Yang Chiu-hsing	Democratic Progressive Party
Keelung City	Hsu Tsai-li	Kuomintang
Kinmen County	Lee Chu-feng	New Party
Lienchiang County	Chen Hsueh-sheng	People First Party
Miaoli County	Fu Hsueh-peng	Independent
Nantou County	Lin Tsung-nan	Democratic Progressive Party
Penghu County	Lai Feng-wei	Kuomintang
Pingtung County	Su Jia-chyuan	Democratic Progressive Party
Taichung City	Jason Hu	Kuomintang
Taichung County	Huang Chung-sheng (黃仲生)	Kuomintang
Tainan City	Hsu Tain-tsair	Democratic Progressive Party
Tainan County	Su Huan-chih	Democratic Progressive Party
Taipei County	Su Tseng-chang	Democratic Progressive Party
Taitung County	Hsu Ching-yuan	People First Party
Taoyuan County	Eric Chu	Kuomintang
Yilan County	Liu Shou-ch'eng	Democratic Progressive Party
Yunlin County	Chang Jung-wei (張榮味)	Kuomintang

== Mayor elections in special municipalities ==
The election was administered directly under the central government of Taiwan. Mayor candidates for the Kuomintang were elected in Taipei, while candidates for the Democratic Progressive Party were elected in Kaohsiung.

=== Taipei City ===
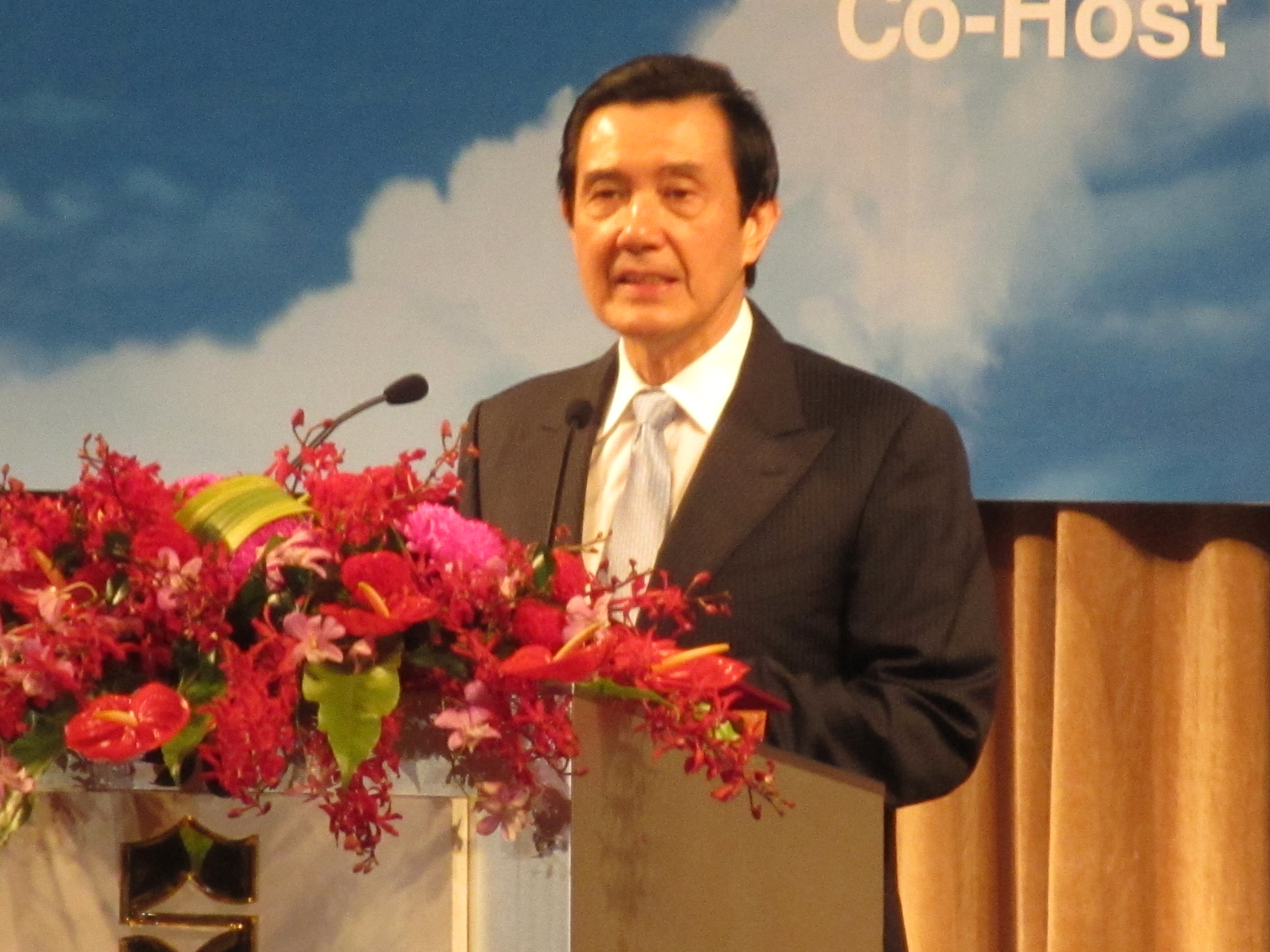
Ma Ying-jeou

Results of Past Taipei Municipal Mayoral Elections
Year	Winning Candidate	Political Party
1994	Chen Shui-bian	Democratic Progressive Party
1998	Ma Ying-jeou	Kuomintang

Results
Party	#	Candidate	Votes	Percentage
Kuomintang	2	Ma Ying-jeou (馬英九)	873,102	64.11%
Democratic Progressive Party	1	Lee Ying-yuan (李應元)	488,811	35.89%
Total			1,374,862	100.00%
Voter turnout			70.61%	

=== Kaohsiung City ===
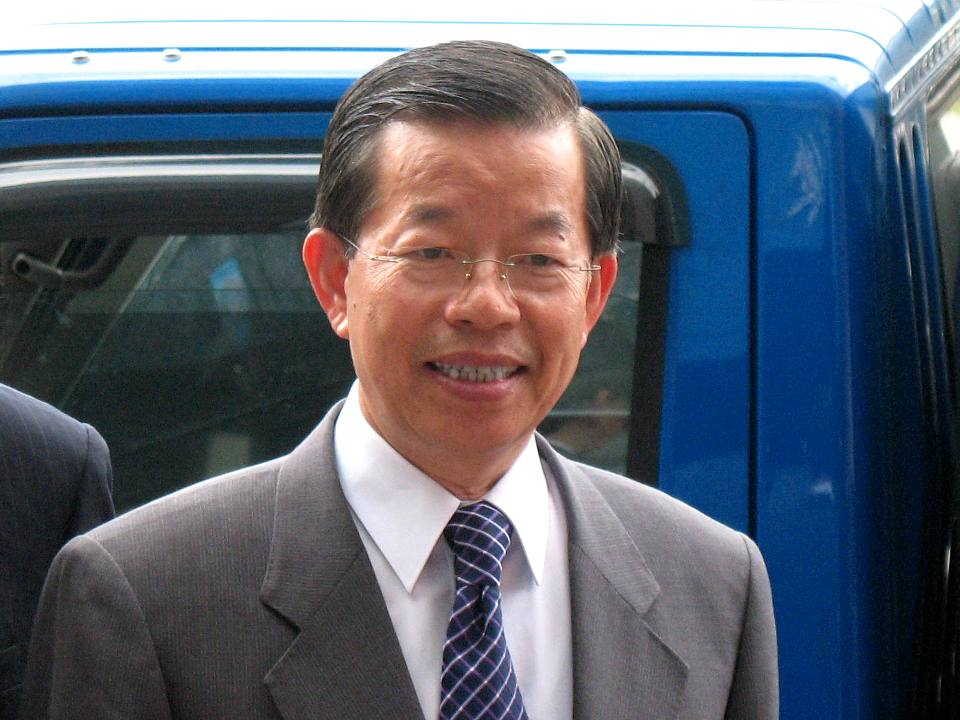
Frank Hsieh

Results of Past Kaohsiung Municipal Mayoral Elections
Year	Winning Candidate	Political Party
1994	Wu Den-yih	Kuomintang
1998	Hsieh Chang-ting	Democratic Progressive Party

Results
Party	#	Candidate	Votes	Percentage
Democratic Progressive Party	5	Hsieh Chang-ting (謝長廷)	386,384	50.04%
Kuomintang	4	Huang Jun-ying (黃俊英)	361,546	46.82%
Independent	2	Chang Po-ya (張博雅)	13,479	1.75%
Independent	1	Shih Ming-te (施明德)	8,750	1.13%
Independent	3	Huang Tian-sheng (黃天生)	1,998	0.26%
Total			779,911	100.00%
Voter turnout			71.38%	

== See also ==
- Elections in Taiwan
