= Hou Chong-wen =

Taiwanese sociologist and politician

- 侯崇文

Deputy Mayor of Chiayi City
- In office 25 December 2014 – 25 December 2018
- Mayor: Twu Shiing-jer

Personal details
- Born: 3 January 1954 (age 72)
- Education: Fu Jen Catholic University (BA); Texas Christian University (MA); Bowling Green State University (PhD)

Hou Chong-wen (Chinese: 侯崇文; pinyin: Hóu Chóngwén; born 3 January 1954) is a Taiwanese sociologist and politician. He was the Deputy Mayor of Chiayi City from 2014 to 2018.

== Education ==
Hou graduated from Fu Jen Catholic University with a bachelor's degree in social science in 1976. He then completed graduate studies in the United States, earning a master's degree in sociology from Texas Christian University in 1980 and his Ph.D. in sociology from Bowling Green State University in 1984.
