= Hsiao Uan-u =

Taiwanese politician (born 1973)

Hsiao Uan-u MLY
- 蕭苑瑜
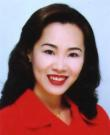

Member of the Legislative Yuan
- In office 1 February 1999 – 31 January 2002
- Constituency: Chiayi County

Personal details
- Born: 12 October 1973 (age 52) Chiayi, Taiwan
- Party: Kuomintang
- Relations: Hsiao Shui-li (cousin)
- Education: California State University, Northridge (BA); Golden Gate University (MA); Nanhua University (MBA); National Chiayi University (PhD)

Hsiao Uan-u (Chinese: 蕭苑瑜; born 12 October 1973) is a Taiwanese politician.

== Early life and education ==
Hsiao was born in Chiayi on October 12, 1973, the daughter of Hsiao Teng-wang, a former speaker of Chiayi City Council.

After high school, Hsiao attended college in the United States. She graduated from California State University, Northridge, with a bachelor's degree in accounting and earned a master's degree in finance from Golden Gate University in San Francisco, California, in 1998. In 2009, she obtained a Master of Business Administration (M.B.A.) from Nanhua University. She wrote her M.B.A. thesis, "A study on the collaboration between public sectors and non-profit organizations in the development of a cultural tourism industry," on local music in Chiayi (公部門與非營利組織合作發展文化觀光產業之研究－以嘉義市國際管樂節為例).

In 2016, she earned a Ph.D. in business administration from National Chiayi University. Her doctoral dissertation was titled, "A study on the relationship between service scenarios, experience value, relationship quality and relationship marketing output" (服務場景、體驗價值、關係品質與關係行銷產出關係之研究).

== Political career ==
Hsiao's uncle, Hsiao Teng-shi, ran her 1998 legislative campaign, and Hsiao Uan-u won due to her family's considerable political influence in Chiayi. While in office, Hsiao Uan-u served as family spokesperson, as Hsiao Teng-piao, another paternal uncle, who, like her father, had served on the Chiayi City Council, chose to face charges of blackmail, illegal confinement, graft, and bribery. Months after Hsiao Uan-u completed her term in January 2002, Hsiao Teng-piao was paroled.
