= Lee Chun-yi =

Taiwanese politician (born 1965)

Lee Chun-yi MLY
- 李俊俋
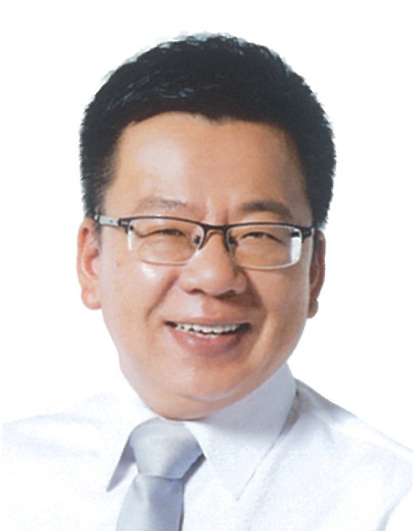
- Official portrait, 2012

21st Secretary-General of the Control Yuan
- In office 1 October 2023 – 1 June 2025
- CY President: Chen Chu
- Preceded by: Chu Fu-mei

Deputy Minister of Labor
- In office 31 January 2023 – 30 September 2023
- Minister: Hsu Ming-chun
- Vice: Chen Ming-jen
- Preceded by: Wang Shang-chih

Member of the Legislative Yuan
- In office 1 February 2012 – 31 January 2020
- Preceded by: Chiang Yi-hsiung
- Succeeded by: Wang Mei-hui
- Constituency: Chiayi

Vice Minister of the Civil Service
- In office 2004–2005

Deputy Mayor of Chiayi
- In office 2001–2004
- Mayor: Chen Li-chen

Personal details
- Born: 6 July 1965 (age 60) Chiayi, Taiwan
- Party: Democratic Progressive Party
- Education: Chinese Culture University (BA); Boston College (MA); George Washington University (PhD)

Lee Chun-yi

Chinese name
- Traditional Chinese: 李俊俋
Transcriptions
Standard Mandarin
- Hanyu Pinyin: Lǐ Jùnyì
- Wade–Giles: Li3 Chün4 I4
Southern Min
- Hokkien POJ: Lí Chùn-ip
- Tâi-lô: Lí Tsùn-ip

Lee Chun-yi (Chinese: 李俊俋; pinyin: Lǐ Jùnyì; Wade–Giles: Li^{3} Chün^{4} I^{4}; Pe̍h-ōe-jī: Lí Chùn-ip; born 6 July 1965) is a Taiwanese political scientist and politician who was a member of the Legislative Yuan representing Chiayi district from 2012 to 2020.

== Early life and education ==
Lee was born in Chiayi on July 6, 1965. After graduating from Taipei Municipal Zhong-zheng Senior High School, he attended Chinese Culture University and obtained a B.A. in political science. He then completed graduate studies in the United States, earning an M.A. in political science from Boston College and a Ph.D. in political science from George Washington University.

== Political career ==
Lee was deputy mayor of Chiayi between 2001 and 2004, when he left office to be appointed the vice minister of civil service. In 2005, he challenged Chen Li-chen in a mayoral primary, and lost. Lee contested the Chiayi district legislative seat in 2012, defeating incumbent Chiang Yi-hsiung. Lee was elected co-convenor of the Internal Administration Committee alongside Wu Yu-sheng in 2014. The pair succeeded Chang Ching-chung, who had, by forcibly passing the Cross-Strait Service Trade Agreement through the committee earlier that year, inadvertently caused the Sunflower Student Movement. Lee supported the creation of a committee to consider constitutional amendments in December. Lee won reelection in 2016. After stepping down at the end of his legislative term in 2020, Lee served as deputy secretary-general of the presidential office. In June 2022, Lee received the DPP nomination for the Chiayi mayoralty. He was appointed deputy labor minister in January 2023. Lee resigned from his position as the secretary-general of the Control Yuan in June 2025, after admitted to his use of a governmental vehicle for personal errands.
