= Chiayi City Constituency =

Constituency of the Legislative Yuan of Taiwan

Coordinates: 23°28′48″N 120°26′59″E

Chiayi City
- Single-member constituency for the Legislative Yuan
- District: Chiayi City
- Electorate: 212,843

Current constituency
- Created: 2008
- Number of members: 1

Chiayi City is represented in the Legislative Yuan since 2008 by one at-large single-member constituency (Chiayi Constituency, Chinese: 嘉義市選舉區; pinyin: Jiāyì Shì Xuǎnjǔ Qū).

== Current district ==
- Chiayi City

== Legislators ==
Kuomintang Democratic Progressive Party Independent

Election	Chiayi City	
1989	Chang Po-ya	
1992	Chai Trong-rong	
1995	Vincent Siew	
Election	Chiayi City	
1998	Chai Trong-rong	Huang Min-hui
2001	Chai Trong-rong	Huang Min-hui
2004	Chai Trong-rong	Huang Min-hui
2006 by-election	Chai Trong-rong	Chiang Yi-hsiung
Election	Chiayi City	
2008 7th	Chiang Yi-hsiung	
2012 8th	Lee Chun-yi	
2016 9th	Lee Chun-yi	
2020 10th	Wang Mei-hui	
2024 11th	Wang Mei-hui	

== Election results ==
=== 2024 ===
Legislative Election 2024: Chiayi City Constituency
Party	Candidate	Votes	%	±%
DPP	Wang Mei-hui	78,069	50.64	+0.44
Kuomintang	Chang Hsiu-Hua	66,822	43.34	+10.12
Taiwan Obasang Political Equality Party	Chen Yueh Chin	6,232	4.04	
Independent	Jian Ming Lian	1,219	0.79	
MiLinguall Party	Lin Chih-Hsun	990	0.64	
Fou Kang Lian Meng Dang	Tsai Sungyi	839	0.54	
Majority		11,247	7.30	−9.68
Total valid votes		154,171		
DPP hold		Swing		

=== 2020 ===
2020 Legislative election
	Elected			Runner-up		
Incumbent	Candidate	Party	Votes (%)	Candidate	Party	Votes (%)
DPP; Lee Chun-yi	Wang Mei-hui	DPP	50.20%	Fu Ta-wei	Kuomintang	33.22%

=== 2016 ===
2016 Legislative election
	Elected			Runner-up		
Incumbent	Candidate	Party	Votes (%)	Candidate	Party	Votes (%)
DPP; Lee Chun-yi	Lee Chun-yi	DPP	53.95%	Wu Yu-jen	Kuomintang	35.66%
