= Molly Yen =

Taiwanese politician (born 1989)

- 顏翎熹
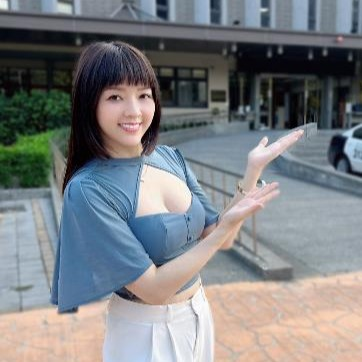
- Yen in 2022

Chiayi City Councillor
- Incumbent
- Assumed office 25 December 2022
- Constituency: Electoral District No. 1 (East District)

Personal details
- Born: 6 July 1989 (age 37) Taipei County, Taiwan (present-day New Taipei City, Taiwan)
- Party: Independent
- Education: Aletheia University

Chinese name
- Traditional Chinese: 顏翎熹
- Simplified Chinese: 颜翎熹
Transcriptions
Standard Mandarin
- Hanyu Pinyin: Yán Língxī
- Wade–Giles: Yen^{2} Ling^{2}-hsi^{1}
Southern Min
- Hokkien POJ: Gân Lêng-hi

Former name
- Traditional Chinese: 顏色不分藍綠支持性專區顏色田慎節
- Simplified Chinese: 颜色不分蓝绿支持性专区颜色田慎节
Transcriptions
Standard Mandarin
- Hanyu Pinyin: Yán Sè Bù Fēn Lán Lǜ Zhī Chí Xìng Zhuān Qū Yán Sè Tián Shèn Jié
- Wade–Giles: Yen^{2} Se^{4} Pu^{4} Fen^{1} Lan^{2} Lü^{4} Chih^{1} Ch'ih^{2} Hsing^{4} Chuan^{1} Ch'ü^{1} Yen^{2} Se^{4} T'ien^{2} Shen^{4} Chieh^{2}
Hakka
- Romanization: Ngièn Set Put Fûn Làm Liu̍k Chṳ̂ Chhṳ̀ Sin Chôn Khî Ngièn Set Thièn Sṳ́m Chiet
Southern Min
- Hokkien POJ: Gân Sek Put Hun Lâm Lio̍k Chi Chhî Sèng Choan Khu Gân Sek Tiân Sīn Chiat

Molly Yen (Note: In local languages: Traditional Chinese script: 顏翎熹; Mandarin Pinyin: Yán Língxī; Hokkien: Gân Lêng-hi) (born 6 July 1989) is a Taiwanese politician, esports presenter, and internet personality who has served as an independent member of the Chiayi City Council since 2022. Her campaign received national attention due to her beauty and satirical sixteen-character Chinese name (Note: In local languages: Traditional Chinese script: 顏色不分藍綠支持性專區顏色田慎節; Mandarin Pinyin: Yán Sè Bù Fēn Lán Lǜ Zhī Chí Xìng Zhuān Qū Yán Sè Tián Shèn Jié; Hokkien: Gân Sek Put Hun Lâm Lio̍k Chi Chhî Sèng Choan Khu Gân Sek Tiân Sīn Chiat; Sixian Hakka: Ngièn Set Put Fûn Làm Liu̍k Chṳ̂ Chhṳ̀ Sin Chôn Khî Ngièn Set Thièn Sṳ́m Chiet) which she had legally adopted before the election. She reverted to her birth name in early 2024. She is known for her advocacy of regulated red-light districts, known in Taiwan as "special sex zones". (Note: In local languages: Traditional Chinese script: 性專區; Mandarin Pinyin: xìngzhuānqū; Hokkien: sèng-choan-khu; Sixian Hakka: sin-chôn-khî)

== Biography ==
Yen was born in Taipei County, present-day New Taipei City, on 6 July 1989. After graduating from the Faculty of Sports Information and Communication at Aletheia University, she worked as a host and presenter for several corporate, esports, and sports events.

Yen ran as an independent for the Chiayi City Council in the 2022 local elections. Her decision was influenced by an online challenge from another Taiwanese internet personality, Kevin Gto, known in Chinese as "Little Businessman". (Note: In local languages: Traditional Chinese script: 小商人; Mandarin Pinyin: Xiǎo Shāngrén) Before starting her campaign, she legally changed her name to Yen Se Pu Fen Lan Lu Chih Chih Hsing Chuan Chu Yen Se Tien Shen Chieh, (Note: In local languages: Traditional Chinese script: 顏色不分藍綠支持性專區顏色田慎節; Mandarin Pinyin: Yán Sè Bù Fēn Lán Lǜ Zhī Chí Xìng Zhuān Qū Yán Sè Tián Shèn Jié; Hokkien: Gân Sek Put Hun Lâm Lio̍k Chi Chhî Sèng Choan Khu Gân Sek Tiân Sīn Chiat; Sixian Hakka: Ngièn Set Put Fûn Làm Liu̍k Chṳ̂ Chhṳ̀ Sin Chôn Khî Ngièn Set Thièn Sṳ́m Chiet) which literally means "colour, not differentiated by blue or green, support special sex zones, colour field, be cautious of festivals". The name references Taiwan's two major political camps, the Pan-Blue and Pan-Green coalitions, while "colour field" is meant to emphasise the ostensible bipartisan nature of the special sex zone issue, i.e. the establishment of regulated red-light districts. The last character 節 is also a homophone of 潔 (both jié), which means "pure" or "innocent". The final part of the name can therefore be read as "be cautious of being pure / innocent", a reference to the Hsu-Kuang Senior High School sexual assault case. (Note: In the incident, a male student allegedly raped his female peer over two years. The government issued a publication ban on the perpetrator's name due to child protection and privacy concerns, but netizens alleged that the government covered up the incident, and Yen changed her name to protest the government's action.) Notably, she met another candidate in the same election, Huang Hung-Cheng, who had similarly changed his legal name into an usually long 15-character one, setting a record at the time.

Yen's campaign centered primarily around a proposal to create in Chiayi "special sex zones" – red-light districts dedicated to regulated sex work. Although the legal concept of special sex zones came into existence through amendments to the Social Order Maintenance Act in 2011, they had yet to be created and implemented anywhere in Taiwan. Yen was elected at-large in Chiayi's first electoral district (corresponding with the East District) with 2,813 votes, or 5.57% of the total votes, ranking ninth out of eighteen candidates. This was enough to secure her one of the first electoral district's ten seats on city council. In the Chiayi City Council's last meeting of 2023, held in December, Yen's proposal to create a special sex zone in Chiayi was approved along with 61 other proposals.

In early 2024, Yen changed her legal name back to her birth name.
