= Hsiao Shu-li =

Taiwanese politician (born 1967)

- 蕭淑麗

Speaker of the Chiayi City Council
- In office 25 December 2014 – 25 December 2018
- Preceded by: Tsai Kuei-tzu
- Succeeded by: Chuang Feng-an

Member of the National Assembly
- In office 20 May 1996 – 19 May 2000

Personal details
- Born: 1 March 1967 (age 59) Chiayi City, Taiwan
- Party: Independent (2014, since 2017)
- Other political affiliations: Kuomintang
- Relations: Hsiao Uan-u (cousin)

Hsiao Shu-li (traditional Chinese: 蕭淑麗; simplified Chinese: 萧淑丽; pinyin: Xiāo Shūlì; born 1 March 1967) is a Taiwanese politician.

== Career ==
Hsiao was a member of the third National Assembly elected from Chiayi, where her family has a strong political base. After her term ended, Hsiao led the Chiayi City Farmers’ Cooperative Association. In 2006, she entered a party primary for a legislative by-election, but ended her candidacy to support Chiang Yi-hsiung. She sought the Kuomintang nomination for the Chiayi mayoralty in 2014, but the party chose to back Chen Yi-chen. Subsequently, Hsiao planned to run for mayor as an independent, but later ended her campaign. She was instead elected speaker of Chiayi City Council, a post once held by her uncle Hsiao Teng-piao. After winning the municipal election, Hsiao rejoined the Kuomintang. She was named a deputy secretary-general of the party in April 2016. Hsiao withdrew from the party for a second time in February 2018, announcing another run for the Chiayi City mayorship. She was formally expelled from the Kuomintang in September 2018.

2018 Chiayi City mayoral results
No.	Candidate	Party	Votes	Percentage
1	Hsiao Shu-li	Independent	25,572	17.98%
2	Huang Min-hui	Kuomintang	58,558	41.18%
3	Huang Hung Chen Taiwan Ah Chen World Great Person Rich President (黃宏成台灣阿成 世界偉人財神總統)	Independent	1,822	1.28%
4	Twu Shiing-jer	Democratic Progressive Party	56,256	39.56%
Total voters			212,843	
Valid votes			142,208	
Invalid votes				
Voter turnout			66.81%	
