= Twu Shiing-jer =

Taiwanese epidemiologist and politician

- 涂醒哲
- Official portrait, 2014

7th Mayor of Chiayi
- In office 25 December 2014 – 25 December 2018
- Deputy: Hou Chong-wen
- Preceded by: Huang Min-hui
- Succeeded by: Huang Min-hui

8th Minister of Health
- In office 1 September 2002 – 18 May 2003; Acting: 1 September – 31 December 2002
- Prime Minister: Yu Shyi-kun
- Preceded by: Lee Ming-liang
- Succeeded by: Chen Chien-jen

1st Chief of Centers for Disease Control
- In office 29 May 2000 – 30 June 2002
- Minister: Lee Ming-liang
- Preceded by: Chang Hung-jen (a.i.)
- Succeeded by: Chiang Ying-lung (a.i.)

Member of the Legislative Yuan for Proportional Representation
- In office 1 February 2008 – 31 January 2012
- Constituency: DPP Party list №3

Personal details
- Born: 17 June 1951 (age 75) Puzi, Chiayi County, Taiwan
- Party: Democratic Progressive Party
- Education: National Taiwan University (MB, MPH); University of California, Los Angeles (PhD)

Chinese name
- Chinese: 涂醒哲
Transcriptions
Standard Mandarin
- Hanyu Pinyin: Tú Xǐngzhé
- Bopomofo: ㄊㄨˊ ㄒㄧㄥˇㄓㄜˊ
- Gwoyeu Romatzyh: Twu Shiing-jer
- Wade–Giles: T'u^{2} Hsing^{3}-che^{2}
- Tongyong Pinyin: Tú Sǐngjhé
- MPS2: Tú Shǐng-jé

Twu Shiing-jer (Chinese: 涂醒哲; pinyin: Tú Xǐngzhé; Wade–Giles: T'u^{²} Hsing^{³}-che^{²}; born 17 June 1951) is a Taiwanese epidemiologist, physician, and politician. He was the minister of the Department of Health from 2002 to 2003 and later served in the Legislative Yuan from 2008 to 2012. He was the Mayor of Chiayi City from 25 December 2014 to 25 December 2018.

== Early life and education ==
Twu was born in Puzi, Chiayi County, to Tu Bing-rong, a mathematics teacher, and Tu Hou-cai. He has four brothers and sisters. In 1969, Twu graduated from National Chiayi Senior High School.

After high school, Twu graduated from National Taiwan University with a Bachelor of Medicine (M.B.) in 1976 and a Master of Public Health (M.P.H.) in 1978. He then completed doctoral studies in the United States, earning his Ph.D. in epidemiology in 1995 from the University of California, Los Angeles, under professors Roger Detels and Sander Greenland. His doctoral dissertation was titled, "Does hepatitis B viral infection promote HIV-1 infection and the progression to AIDS?".

== Health minister ==
Twu succeeded Lee Ming-liang as minister of the Department of Health on 1 September 2002. Twu was shortly after accused of sexual harassment by Cheng Ko-jung, a restaurant owner. This claim was amplified by Diane Lee, a Legislative Yuan member. Cheng and Lee both apologised after realising that Twu had been confused with another man, the Health Ministry's Department of Personnel chief Tu Hau-lin. Tu was later found guilty. Cheng Li-wun, a former National Assembly member, was expelled from the Democratic Progressive Party after having made disparaging comments about Twu. In the wake of the SARS outbreak in Taiwan, Twu resigned on 16 May 2003.

== Mayor of Chiayi City ==
=== 2009 Chiayi City mayor election ===
Twu joined the 2009 Republic of China local elections for the position of Chiayi City mayor. The elections were held on 5 December 2009. He eventually lost to Kuomintang candidate Huang Min-hui.

2009 Chiayi City Mayoralty Election Result
No.	Candidate	Party	Votes	Percentage
1	Huang Min-hui	KMT	69,962	52.20%
2	Lin Sheng-fen (林聖芬)	Independent	2,801	2.09%
3	Twu Shiing-jer	DPP	61,268	45.71%

=== 2014 Chiayi City mayor election ===
Twu won a party primary held in March 2014, and was named the Democratic Progressive Party candidate for the Chiayi City mayoralty. In September, Twu asked the voters to choose the best person, not the wealthiest, referring to politicians from Kuomintang who were mostly backed by their huge assets and government resources to work with business conglomerates run by wealthy families to control local political factions and influence election outcomes. He ran his campaign under the slogan Bold leadership, Chuluo, heading up for Taiwan (氣魄 諸羅 台灣頭). Chiayi was a part of Chuluo County until 1787 when it was renamed.

Twu was elected as the Mayor of Chiayi City after winning the 2014 Chiayi City mayoralty election held on 29 November 2014.

2014 Chiayi City Mayoralty Election Result
No.	Candidate	Party	Votes	Percentage
1	Chen Hsiu-li (陳秀麗)	Independent	633	0.44%
2	Chen Tai-shan (陳泰山)	Independent	786	0.54%
3	Chen Yi-chen (陳以真)	KMT	66,108	45.50%
4	Twu Shiing-jer	DPP	74,698	51.41%
5	Hsu Wen-chien (許文建)	Independent	330	0.23%
6	Lin Shi-han (林詩涵)	People Democratic Front	2,747	1.89%

=== 2018 Chiayi City mayor election ===
2018 Democratic Progressive Party Chiayi City mayoral primary results
Candidates	Place	Result
Twu Shiing-jer	Nominated	Walkover

2018 Chiayi City mayoral results
No.	Candidate	Party	Votes	Percentage
1	Hsiao Shui-li	Independent	25,572	17.98%
2	Huang Min-hui	Kuomintang	58,558	41.18%
3	Huang Hung Chen Taiwan Ah Chen World Great Person Rich President (黃宏成台灣阿成 世界偉人財神總統)	Independent	1,822	1.28%
4	Twu Shiing-jer	Democratic Progressive Party	56,256	39.56%
Total voters			212,843	
Valid votes			142,208	
Invalid votes				
Voter turnout			66.81%	
