= Huang Min-hui =

Taiwanese politician

Huang Ming-hui
- 黃敏惠
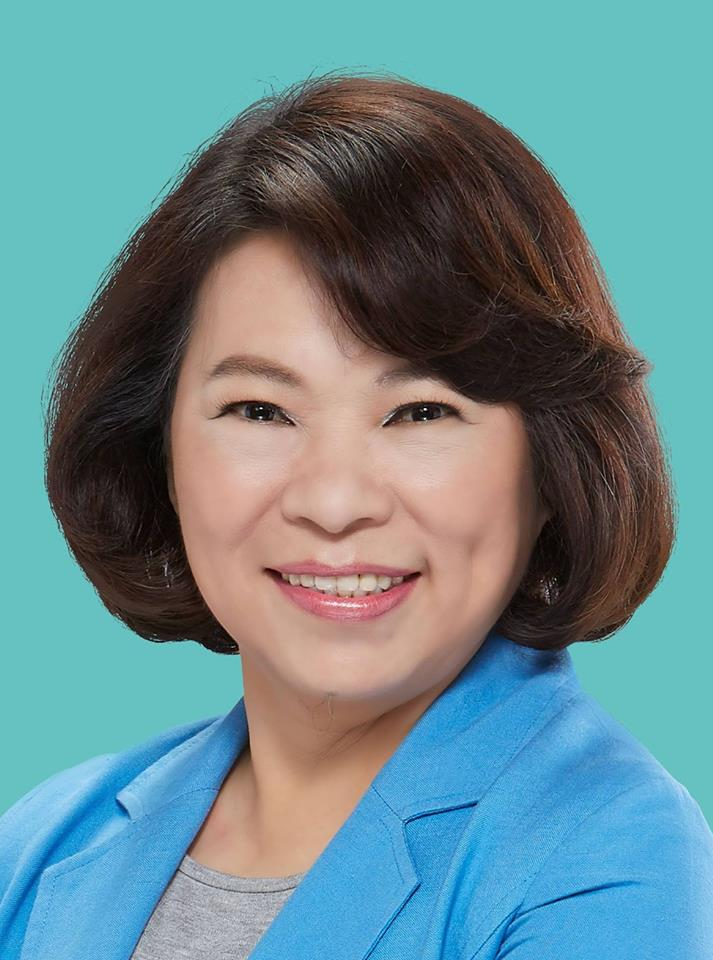
- Official portrait, 2018

6th & 8th Mayor of Chiayi
- Incumbent
- Assumed office 25 December 2018
- Preceded by: Twu Shiing-jer
- In office 20 December 2005 – 25 December 2014
- Preceded by: Chen Li-chen
- Succeeded by: Twu Shiing-jer

Chairwoman of the Kuomintang
- Acting; 16 January 2016 – 30 March 2016
- Secretary General: Lee Shu-chuan
- Vice Chairman: Vacant
- Preceded by: Eric Chu
- Succeeded by: Hung Hsiu-chu
Additional party positions
Vice Chairwoman of Kuomintang
In office 30 October 2021 – 1 November 2025 Serving with Andrew Hsia and Sean Lien
Chairperson	Eric Chu
Preceded by	Hau Lung-pin; Tseng Yung-chuan
Succeeded by	Lee Chien-lung
In office 22 November 2008 – 16 January 2016 Serving with Hau Lung-pin
Chairperson	Wu Po-hsiung; Ma Ying-jeou; Eric Chu; Herself (acting)
Succeeded by	Hau Lung-pin; Jason Hu; Lin Junq-tzer

Member of the Legislative Yuan
- In office 1 February 1999 – 20 December 2005
- Succeeded by: Chiang Yi-hsiung
- Constituency: Chiayi District

Personal details
- Born: 20 January 1959 (age 67) Chiayi, Chiayi County, Taiwan
- Party: Kuomintang
- Education: National Taiwan Normal University (BA); National Chiayi University (MBA)

Huang Ming-hui (Chinese: 黃敏惠; pinyin: Huáng Mǐnghuì; born 20 January 1959) is a Taiwanese politician. She was a member of the Legislative Yuan from 1999 to 2005. Her tenure as vice chairperson of the Kuomintang (2008–16) overlapped with two terms as Mayor of Chiayi City (2005–14).

== Education ==
Huang earned her bachelor's degree in Chinese literature from National Taiwan Normal University and her master's degree in business administration from National Chiayi University.

== Chiayi City Mayorship ==
=== 2005 Chiayi City mayor election ===
Huang was elected as the Mayor of Chiayi City on 3 December 2005 and took office on 20 December 2005.

2005 Chiayi City Mayoralty Election Result
No.	Candidate	Party	Votes	Percentage
1	Chen Li-chen	DPP	62,122	45.37%
2	Huang Min-hui	KMT	74,786	54.63%

=== 2009 Chiayi City mayor election ===
She was elected to her second mayoral term on 5 December 2009 and took office on 20 December 2009.

2009 Chiayi City Mayoralty Election Result
No.	Candidate	Party	Votes	Percentage
1	Huang Min-hui	KMT	69,962	52.20%
2	Lin Sheng-fen (林聖芬)	Independent	2,801	2.09%
3	Twu Shiing-jer	DPP	61,268	45.71%

=== 2018 Chiayi City mayor election ===
Huang announced her candidacy for the Chiayi mayoral primary in January 2018.

2018 Kuomintang Chiayi City mayoral primary results
Candidates	Place	Results
Huang Min-hui	Nominated	Results not released
Jack Lee	2nd	Results not released

2018 Chiayi City mayoral results
No.	Candidate	Party	Votes	Percentage
1	Hsiao Shui-li	Independent	25,572	17.98%
2	Huang Min-hui	Kuomintang	58,558	41.18%
3	Huang Hung Chen Taiwan Ah Chen World Great Person Rich President (黃宏成台灣阿成 世界偉人財神總統)	Independent	1,822	1.28%
4	Twu Shiing-jer	Democratic Progressive Party	56,256	39.56%
Total voters			212,843	
Valid votes			142,208	
Invalid votes				
Voter turnout			66.81%	

== Kuomintang ==
Huang Min-hui was appointed acting chairperson of the KMT on 18 January 2016 after Eric Chu resigned to accept responsibility for the KMT's poor results in the 2016 presidential and legislative election. On 27 January 2016 Huang declared her candidacy for the KMT chairperson by-election. She submitted a petition of 67,926 signatures to the party on 22 February, to officially register as a candidate. The party confirmed 37,780 of those signatures on 26 February, validating her candidacy. Huang won 46,341 votes, finishing second in the election held on March 26.

=== 2016 KMT chairmanship election ===
2016 Kuomintang chairmanship election
No.	Candidate	Party	Votes	Percentage	Result
1	Hung Hsiu-chu	Kuomintang	78,829	56.16%	
2	Huang Min-hui	Kuomintang	46,341	33.02%	
3	Lee Hsin	Kuomintang	7,604	5.42%	
4	Apollo Chen	Kuomintang	6,784	4.83%	
Total votes			337,351		
Turnout			41.61%		

Party political offices
Preceded by Eric Chu	Chairperson of the Kuomintang; Interim; 16 January 2016 – 26 March 2016	Succeeded by Hung Hsiu-chu
