= Hsu Shih-hsien =

Taiwanese academic and politician

- 許世賢
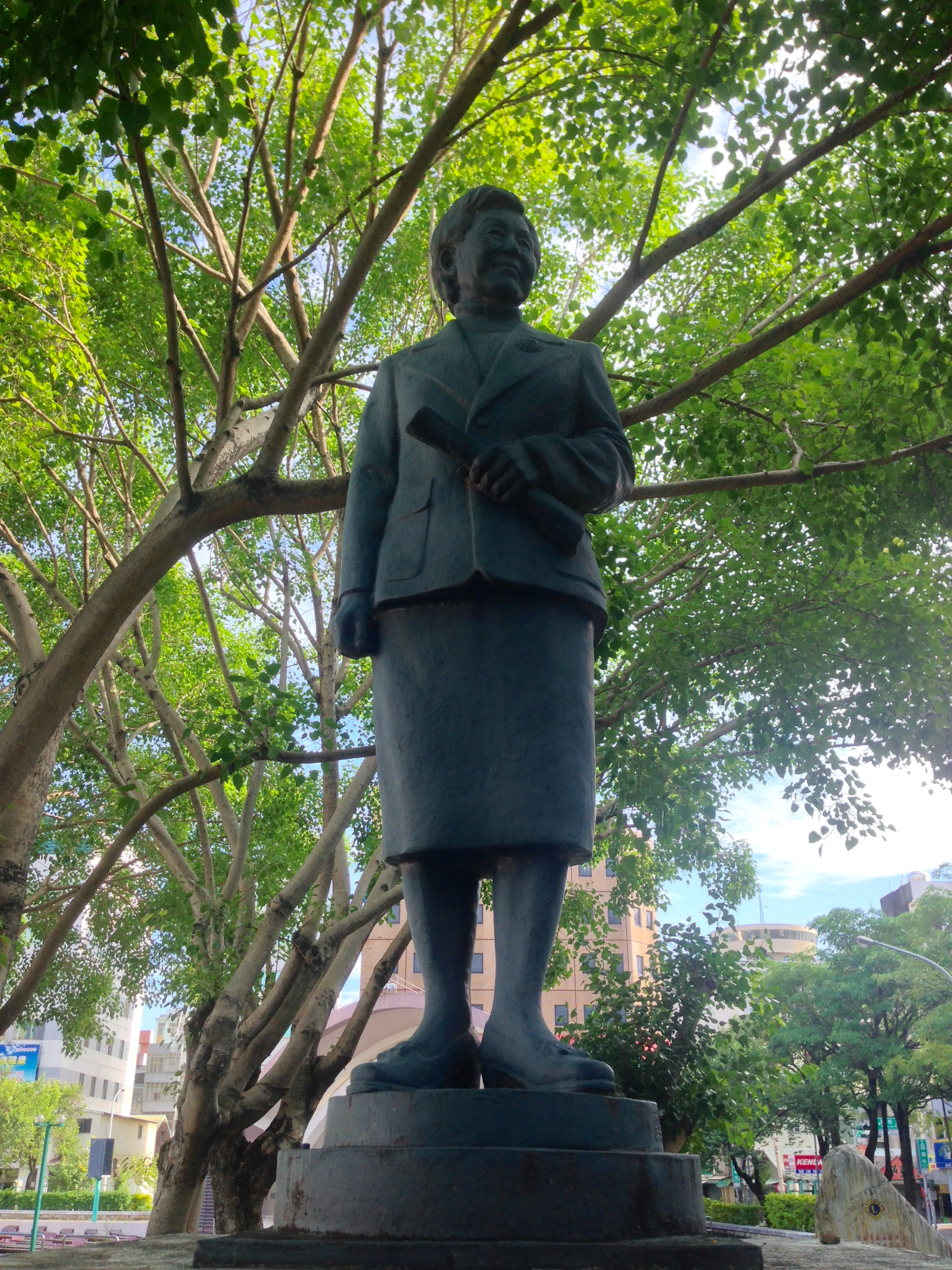

Mayor of Chiayi City
- In office 1 March 1968 – 31 October 1972
- Preceded by: Fang Huei-lung
- Succeeded by: Lien Min (acting); Ruan Chih-tsung
- In office 1 March 1982 – 30 June 1983
- Preceded by: Ruan Chih-tsung
- Succeeded by: Chiang Ching-lin (acting); Chang Po-ya

Member of the Legislative Yuan
- In office 1 February 1973 – 31 January 1981
- Constituency: Taiwan 4th Yunlin County, Chiayi County, Tainan County, Tainan City

Personal details
- Born: 1 April 1908 Tainan-cho, Japanese Taiwan (modern-day Tainan, Taiwan)
- Died: 30 June 1983 (aged 75)
- Children: Chang Po-ya and Chang Wen-ying (daughters)
- Education: Tokyo Women's Medical College (now Tokyo Women's Medical University); Kyushu Imperial University
- Occupation: Politician, academic and physician

Hsu Shih-hsien (Chinese: 許世賢; pinyin: Xǔ Shìxián; Pe̍h-ōe-jī: Khó͘ Sè-hiân; 1 April 1908 – 30 June 1983) was a Taiwanese physician, academic and politician.

Born in 1908 in Japanese Taiwan, Hsu opposed colonialism at an early age. As a student, she refused to acknowledge Hirohito's birthday and defended others who spoke Hokkien. Hsu later became the first Taiwanese woman to earn a doctorate. She was also the first female high school principal and city council member in Taiwan. In 1940, Hsu and her husband established a hospital in Chiayi City.

Hsu joined the Kuomintang after their arrival in Taiwan in 1945, and was later elected to the Taiwan Provincial Assembly. She attempted to withdraw from the party three times, after disagreeing with the suspension of county commissioner Lee Mao-sung before courts had ruled on charges of corruption against him. She was reelected to the Taiwan Provincial Assembly as an independent in April 1957. Hsu was formally expelled from the Kuomintang in 1958, because she had joined the Chinese Local Autonomy Research Society. As an assembly member, Hsu became known for asking rigorous questions of the ruling party, and was one of six Taiwan-born provincial legislators, referred to as Five Dragons, One Phoenix. In 1960, she worked with Lei Chen to establish the China Democracy Party. It was shut down shortly thereafter, and Lei was arrested. Hsu joined the tangwai movement soon afterwards, coordinating a campaign team for independent candidates from January 1961. She was elected mayor of Chiayi City in 1968, and was the first woman to be elected mayor in Taiwan. Hsu left the provincial legislature after four terms to assume the mayoralty. By the end of Hsu's mayoral term in 1972, the Kuomintang had instituted an age limit of 60 for local offices, making it illegal for her to run for a second term. Instead, Hsu campaigned for a seat on the Legislative Yuan, leading the December 1972 elections with the highest vote total. She stepped down in 1981, choosing to launch a second mayoral campaign in Chiayi because the age limit had been lifted. Hsu died in office in 1983.

Two of her daughters, Chang Po-ya and Chang Wen-ying, later served as Mayor of Chiayi.

A museum dedicated to Hsu opened in 2014.
