= Sander Greenland =

American statistician and epidemiologist

- Born: January 16, 1951 (age 75)
- Education: University of California, Los Angeles; University of California, Berkeley
- Scientific career
- Fields: Statistics; Epidemiology
- Workplaces: University of California, Los Angeles
- Doctoral advisor: Raymond Neutra
- Doctoral students: Twu Shiing-jer

Sander Greenland (born January 16, 1951) is an American statistician and epidemiologist with many contributions to statistical and epidemiologic methods including Bayesian and causal inference, bias analysis, and meta-analysis. His focus has been the extensions, limitations, and misuses of statistical methods in nonexperimental studies, especially in postmarketing surveillance of drugs, vaccines, and medical devices. He received honors Bachelor's and master's degrees in mathematics from the University of California, Berkeley, where he was Regent's and National Science Foundation Fellow in Mathematics, and then received Master's and Doctoral degrees in epidemiology from the University of California, Los Angeles (UCLA), where he was Regent's Fellow in Epidemiology. After serving as an assistant professor of biostatistics at Harvard, he joined the UCLA Epidemiology faculty in 1980 where he became Professor of Epidemiology in the Fielding School of Public Health in 1989, and Professor of Statistics in the UCLA College of Letters and Science in 1999. He moved to Emeritus status in 2012 and the following year he was awarded an honorary Doctor of Medicine by the University of Aarhus, Denmark.

Greenland has published over 400 scientific papers and book chapters, over a dozen of which have been cited over a thousand times and several over two thousand times, including and one of which was chosen as a discussion paper by the Royal Statistical Society. He is the co-author of a leading advanced textbook on epidemiology (2nd and 3rd edition). He was made a Fellow of the Royal Statistical Society in 1993 and a Fellow of the American Statistical Association in 1998, and has received numerous teaching and service awards. He has been an invited lecturer at over 200 scientific institutions worldwide including Harvard, Oxford, Cambridge, Columbia, Stanford, Yale, and Erasmus universities, the Massachusetts Institute of Technology, the National Institutes of Health, the Santa Fe Institute, and the Karolinska Institute in Sweden. He has also served as a consultant to U.S. governmental agencies including the National Academy of Sciences, the Food and Drug Administration, the Centers for Disease Control, and the Environmental Protection Agency, as well the World Health Organization. He has further served as an editor for statistical and epidemiologic journals and books including the Dictionary of Epidemiology sponsored by the International Epidemiological Association.

He is a leading critic of arbitrary significance thresholds in science and has drawn attention to misunderstandings and abuses of statistical methods such as p-values and interval estimates.
