= Chen Li-chen =

Taiwanese politician

- 陳麗貞

5th Mayor of Chiayi
- In office 22 May 2000 – 20 December 2005; Acting: 22 May 2000 – 20 December 2001
- Preceded by: Chang Po-ya
- Succeeded by: Huang Min-hui

Personal details
- Born: 6 July 1958 (age 68) Jiali, Tainan, Taiwan
- Party: Democratic Progressive Party (since 2003)
- Education: China Medical University (MS)

Chen Li-chen (Chinese: 陳麗貞; pinyin: Chén Lìzhēn; born 6 July 1958) is a Taiwanese politician.

Chen graduated from China Medical University with a master's degree in environmental medicine.

She began her political career working for the Chiayi City Environmental Protection Bureau and later the Department of Health. In 1999, Chen was named deputy mayor of Chiayi under Chang Po-ya, who she succeeded in office when Chang was appointed to lead the interior ministry. Chen joined the Democratic Progressive Party in March 2003.

== 2005 Chiayi City mayor election ==
She defeated Lee Chun-yi in a party primary, and the DPP backed Chen as its Chiayi mayoral candidate for the 2005 elections. She lost to Kuomintang candidate Huang Min-hui, who left the legislature to assume the mayoralty. Chen then contested Huang's vacant legislative seat on behalf of the DPP, and lost to Chiang Yi-hsiung.

2005 Chiayi City Mayoralty Election Result
No.	Candidate	Party	Votes	Percentage
1	Chen Li-chen	DPP	62,122	45.37%
2	Huang Min-hui	KMT	74,786	54.63%
