= Zhuluo County =

Zhuluo County 諸羅縣
- Zhuluo County at its largest extent in 1685
- Country: Qing Empire
- Province: Fujian
- Prefecture: Taiwan
- Established: 1684
- Abolished: 1787
- Seat: Jialixing (1684–1704); Zhuluoshan (1704–1787)

Zhuluo County (Chinese: 諸羅縣; pinyin: Zhūluó Xiàn; Wade–Giles: Chu-lo Hsien; Pe̍h-ōe-jī: Chu-lô-koān) was a political division in Taiwan from 1684 to 1787, during Qing Dynasty rule of the island. Initially encompassing the underdeveloped northern two-thirds of Taiwan, the county shrank in size as the population and economy of the northern and central western plains grew and new counties were created out of the developed areas; the Zhuluo county was eventually reduced to an under-developed area in south-western Taiwan. In 1787, the county underwent further restructuring and was renamed Chiayi County.

== Name ==
The city now known as Chiayi originally took its name from the aboriginal tribe who lived there: the Tirosen. The former Chinese placename was Tsu-lo-san (Chinese: 諸羅山; pinyin: Zhūluóshān; Pe̍h-ōe-jī: Chu-lô-san), a representation of the original Formosan-language name. This town (in reality a village of perhaps one or two thousand people) gave its name to the surrounding area, dropping the -shan to leave Zhuluo as the name for the county as a whole. In some English-language texts the spellings Chu-lo or Choolo are used.

== 1684–1723 ==
When the Qing wrested the island from the control of the Kingdom of Tungning in 1683, Taiwan was made a prefecture under the administration of Fujian Province. This new Taiwan Prefecture included three hien or districts; Zhuluo County covered the central western plains and the north.

The county started as a catch-all for the areas not incorporated into one of the other, smaller, more developed counties. Zhuluo County was initially made up of four Villages (里; Lǐ; Lí) and 34 Communities (社; Shè; Siā - the name normally given to aboriginal settlements). The villages were all near the border with Taiwan County, with the communities making up the rest of Zhuluo County. At this point in time the county covered 18,499 km^{2}, more than half the total area of Taiwan, with the county seat in the Jialixing area of Kaihua Village (modern-day Jiali District, Tainan).

Administrative divisions (1685–1694)
Villages 里	Shanhua (善化) · Xinhua (新化) · Anding (安定) · Kaihua (開化)
Communities 社	Xialong (蕭壠) · Madou (麻豆) · Xingang (新港) · Dawulong (大武壠) · Mujialiuwan (目加溜灣) · Daogeguo (倒咯嘓) · Damao (打貓) · Zhuluoshan (諸羅山) · Alishan (阿里山) · Qileng'an (奇冷岸) · Dajufo (大居佛) · Taliwu (他裡霧) · Houmen (猴悶) · Shaluniuma (沙轆牛罵) · Chailidouliu (柴裡斗六) · Dongluo (東螺) · Xiluo (西螺) · South Beitou (南北投) · Mawuce (蔴務拺) · Bengshan (崩山) · Dajiedian (大傑顚) · Xingangzai (新港仔) · Zhuqian (竹塹) · Nanqian (南嵌) · Jilong (雞籠) · Upper Tamsui (上淡水) · Mazhigan (蔴芝干) · Nan (南) · Erlin (二林) · Mazhili (馬之遴) · Datu (大突) · Yaci (亞朿) · Banxiandadu (半線大肚) · Dawujunniu (大武郡牛)

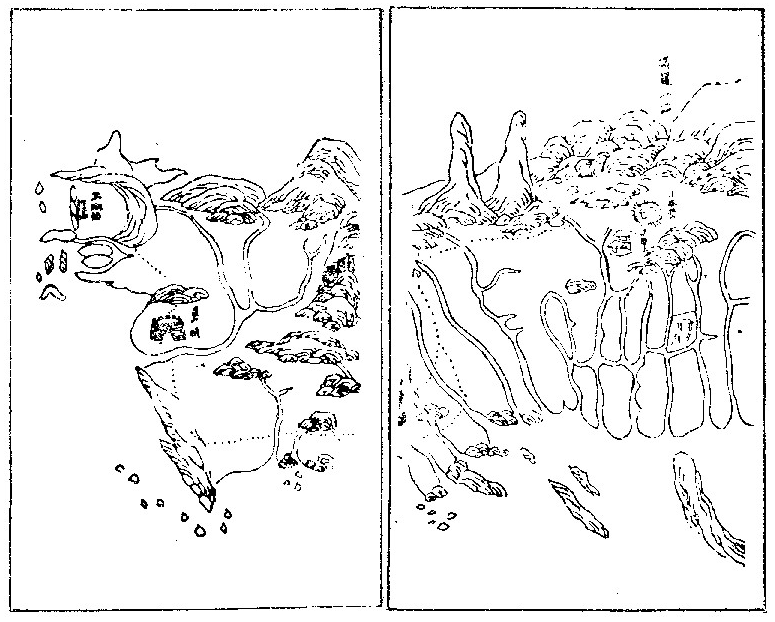
1696 map of Zhuluo

In 1697, the Qing Imperial official Yu Yonghe visited the area and wrote that "Zhuluo and Fengshan have no residents, only savages" i.e. there were no Han Chinese settlements in the county. In 1694, there was only one registered market in Zhuluo as opposed to 17 in the far smaller Taiwan County, a situation which reflected the disparity in the Han Chinese populations in both counties.

In the first two decades of the eighteenth century Han settlers began to encroach more extensively into Zhuluo, with significant Chinese populations cultivating in the areas around modern-day Douliu and Changhua City. Settlers who attempted to move further north were however violently resisted by aboriginal tribes. In 1704, the administrative seat of the county was relocated to Zhuluoshan, today known as Chiayi City.

== 1723–1787 ==
By 1723, following the Zhu Yigui rebellion, the number of Han Chinese settlements in central and northern Taiwan had increased dramatically. To facilitate better administration Zhuluo was split into three. The northernmost section, corresponding to modern-day Taipei, New Taipei, Keelung, Taoyuan City, Hsinchu City, Hsinchu County, and Miaoli County, was called Tamsui Subprefecture (淡水廳). Changhua County (彰化縣) was also created, encompassing the area of modern Changhua County, Taichung, half of Yunlin County and three townships of Nantou County. The remaining area, some 3,844 km^{2} from the Huwei River (虎尾溪) to the borders with Taiwan County and the ungoverned aboriginal areas, remained under the name of Zhuluo County.

In 1787, the Lin Shuangwen rebellion against Qing rule began, and rebels gained control of almost the entire island. Imperial troops regained control of the city and vicinity in 1788. In 1787, the county was renamed Chiayi County (Chinese: 嘉義; pinyin: Jiāyì; lit. 'commended righteousness') to reflect the fidelity of the city during the incident.

== See also ==
- History of Taiwan

== Bibliography ==
- Davidson, James W. (1903). The Island of Formosa, Past and Present : history, people, resources, and commercial prospects : tea, camphor, sugar, gold, coal, sulphur, economical plants, and other productions. London and New York: Macmillan & co. OL 6931635M.
- Hsu, Hsueh-chi, ed. (2006). 臺灣歷史辭典 [Dictionary of Taiwan History] (in Chinese) (4th ed.). Taipei: Yuan-Liou. ISBN 9570174307.
- Keliher, Macabe (2004). Small Sea Travel Diaries: Yu Yonghe's Records of Taiwan. Southern Materials Center. ISBN 9576386292.
- Shepherd, John (1993). Statecraft and Political Economy on the Taiwan Frontier, 1600–1800. Stanford University Press. ISBN 9780804720663.
