= Chang Po-ya =

Taiwanese politician

- 張博雅
- Official portrait, 2021

Senior Advisor to the President
- Incumbent
- Assumed office 9 February 2021
- President: Tsai Ing-wen; Lai Ching-te
- In office 1 January 2009 – 15 November 2010
- President: Ma Ying-jeou

9th President of the Control Yuan
- In office 1 August 2014 – 31 July 2020
- Vice President: Sun Ta-chuan
- Preceded by: Wang Chien-shien
- Succeeded by: Chen Chu

2nd Chairperson of the Central Election Commission
- In office 15 November 2010 – 31 July 2014 (Note: Acting by Lin Tsi-lin from 3 November 2013 to 4 December 2013)
- Prime Minister: Wu Den-yih; Sean Chen; Jiang Yi-huah
- Preceded by: Rai Hau-min (Note: Ad interim: Liu I-chou)
- Succeeded by: Liu I-chou

1st Chair of the Non-Partisan Solidarity Union
- In office 16 June 2004 – 14 June 2007
- Preceded by: Position established
- Succeeded by: Lin Pin-kuan

23rd Minister of the Interior
- In office 20 May 2000 – 1 February 2002
- Prime Minister: Tang Fei; Chang Chun-hsiung
- Preceded by: Huang Chu-wen
- Succeeded by: Yu Cheng-hsien

16th Chair of the Provincial Government
- In office 20 May 2000 – 1 February 2002
- Prime Minister: Tang Fei; Chang Chun-hsiung
- Preceded by: Chao Shou-po (Note: Ad interim: Jiang Ching-hsien)
- Succeeded by: Fan Kuang-chun

2nd & 4th Mayor of Chiayi
- In office 20 December 1997 – 22 May 2000
- Preceded by: Chang Wen-ying
- Succeeded by: Chen Li-chen
- In office 15 December 1983 – 20 December 1989
- Preceded by: Hsu Shih-hsien (Note: Ad interim: Chiang Ching-lin)
- Succeeded by: Chang Wen-ying

5th Minister of Health
- In office 2 June 1990 – 31 August 1997
- Prime Minister: Hau Pei-tsun; Lien Chan
- Preceded by: Shih Chun-jen
- Succeeded by: Steve Chan

Member of the Legislative Yuan
- In office 1 February 1990 – 2 June 1990
- Constituency: Chiayi XII

Personal details
- Born: 5 October 1942 (age 84) Kagi City, Tainan Prefecture, Taiwan, Empire of Japan (modern-day Chiayi City, Taiwan)
- Party: Non-Partisan Solidarity Union
- Parent: Hsu Shih-hsien (mother)
- Relatives: Chang Wen-ying (sister)
- Education: Kaohsiung Medical University (MD); National Taiwan University (MPH); Johns Hopkins University (MPH); Kyorin University (PhD)

Chang Po-ya (Chinese: 張博雅; pinyin: Zhāng Bóyǎ; born 5 October 1942) is a Taiwanese politician and physician who is the founder of the Non-Partisan Solidarity Union, a political party in Taiwan.

== Early life and education ==
Chang was born in what is now Chiayi City to Hsu Shih-hsien and Chang Chin-tung, both physicians.

After high school, Chang graduated from Kaohsiung Medical University with a Doctor of Medicine (M.D.) in 1968 and earned a Master of Public Health (M.P.H.) in 1970 from National Taiwan University. She then completed graduate studies in the United States at Johns Hopkins University, where she earned a second M.P.H. from the Johns Hopkins School of Medicine in 1974. In 1994, she earned her Ph.D. in medical science from Kyorin University in Japan in 1994.

== Academic career ==
From 1980 to 1983, Chang was a professor at Kaohsiung Medical University, where she directed the medical college's Department of Public Health.

== Political career ==
She was the mayor of her home city, serving three terms (1983–89, 1997–2000), the first time succeeding her mother, Hsu; the last time succeeding her sister, Chang Wen-ying. The Chang daughters and mother are known as the Hsü Family of Chiayi (許家班). During her first term, martial law was lifted and she led the creation of The First 228 Peace Memorial Monument in Taiwan.

She was the Minister of Health from June 2, 1990 to September 10, 1997 and led the creation of Taiwan's national health insurance system.

Under President Chen Shui-bian, she was the Minister of Interior from May 20, 2000 to February 1, 2002 and also served as Governor of the Taiwan Provincial Government.

On 7 December 2002, she came in 4th as an independent candidate in the Kaohsiung City mayoral election.

2002 Kaohsiung City Mayoral Election Result
Party	#	Candidate	Votes	Percentage
Independent	1	Shih Ming-teh	8,750	1.13%
Independent	2	Chang Po-ya	13,479	1.75%
Independent	3	Huang Tian-sheng (黃天生)	1,998	0.26%
Kuomintang	4	Huang Jun-ying (黃俊英)	361,546	46.82%
Democratic Progressive Party	5	Frank Hsieh	386,384	50.04%
Total			779,911	100.00%
Voter turnout			71.38%	

From 2014 to 2020, she served as the 5th President and first female President of Taiwan's Control Yuan.

== Personal life ==
She was married to Chi Chan-nan (紀展南) from 1971 to his death in 2023, with a son and a daughter.

== Notes ==
Government offices
Preceded by Hsu Shih-hsien (mother)	Mayor of Chiayi; 1983–1989	Succeeded by Chang Wen-ying (sister)
Preceded by Chang Wen-ying (sister)	Mayor of Chiayi; 1997–2000	Succeeded by Chen Li-chen
Preceded by Wang Chien-shien	President of the Control Yuan; 2014-2020	Succeeded by Chen Chu
Party political offices
New title	Chairperson of the NPSU; 2004–2007	Succeeded by Lin Pin-kuan
