= Chiayi City Council =

Legislature of Chiayi City, Taiwan

Coordinates: 23°28′46.2″N 120°25′55.6″E

Chiayi City Council 嘉義市議會

Type
- Type: City Council

Leadership
- Speaker: Chen Tzu-wen since 2022
- Deputy Speaker: Zhang Yong-Zhang since 2022

Structure
- Seats: 24
- Political groups: KMT (7); DPP (4); NPP (1); Independents (10); Vacant (1)

Elections
- Voting system: Single non-transferable vote
- Last election: 2022

Meeting place
- West District, Chiayi City, Taiwan

Website
- Official website

The Chiayi City Council (CYCC; traditional Chinese: 嘉義市議會; simplified Chinese: 嘉义市议会; pinyin: Jiāyì Shì Yìhuì) is the elected city council of Chiayi City, Taiwan. The council composes of 24 councilors lastly elected through the 2022 Republic of China local election on 26 November 2022.

== Organization ==
=== Congress ===
- Speaker
- Vice Speaker
- Councilors
- Committees
  - Procedural Committee
  - Disciplinary Committee
  - The First Review Committee
  - The Second Review Committee
  - The Third Review Committee
  - The Fourth Review Committee

=== Administrative unit ===
- Secretary-General
- Confidential Secretary
- Secretary
- Unit
  - Agenda Affairs Section
  - Legal Affairs Office
  - General Affairs Section
  - Personnel Office
  - Accounting Office

== Current members ==
Members of the 11th Chiayi City Council:

1. Fu Ta-wei
2. Huang Lu-hui
3. Huang Ying-chih
4. Chen Chia-ping
5. Chang Min-chi
6. Kuo Ting-wei
7. Tai Ning
8. Chang Jung-tsang
9. Yen Ling-hsi
10. Li Yi-te
11. Chang Hsiu-hua
12. Cheng Kuang-hung
13. Huang Min-hsiu
14. Huang Szu-ting
15. Huang Ta-yu
16. Lin Wei-hsuan
17. Su Tse-feng
18. Chen Tzu-wen
19. Sun Kuan-chih
20. Tsai Wen-hsu
21. Tsai Kun-jui
22. Li Chung-li
23. Wang Hao

== Speakers ==
- Tsai Kuei-tzu (2012–2014)
- Hsiao Shu-li (2014–2018)
- Chuang Feng-an (2018–2022)
- Chen Tzu-wen (2022–present)

== Transportation ==
The council is accessible within walking distance West from Chiayi Station of Taiwan Railway.

== See also ==
- Chiayi City Government
