= Mayor of Chiayi =

Mayor of the City of Chiayi
- Flag of Chiayi City

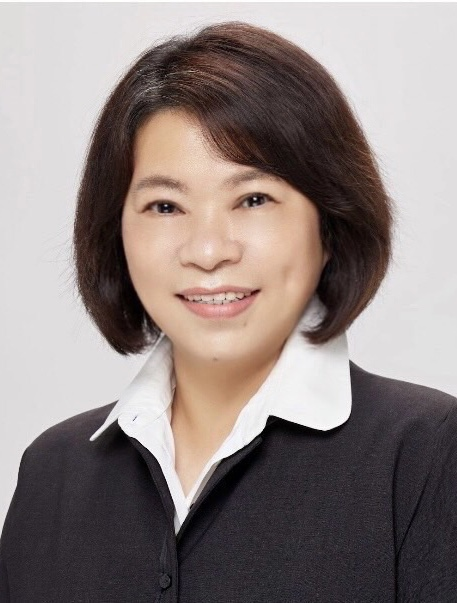
- Incumbent; Huang Min-hui since 25 December 2018
- Term length: 4 years; may serve 1 consecutive terms

The mayor of Chiayi is the chief executive of the government of Chiayi City. The current mayor is Huang Min-hui of Kuomintang since 25 December 2018.

== List of mayors ==
This list includes mayors of the city's county-administered era (1952–1982) and provincial era (1982–present). During the city's provincial era, all but one of the city's elected mayors were women.

=== County-administered City era ===
Name	Office
Lai Yuan-ping (賴淵平)	1952–1954
He Mao-chu (何茂取)	1954–1960
Su Yu-heng (蘇玉衡)	1960–1964
Fang Huei-lung (方輝龍)	1964–1968
Hsu Shih-hsien (許世賢)	1 March 1968 – 31 October 1972
(連敏) (acting)	31 October 1972 – 1 April 1973
Ruan Chih-tsung (阮志聰)	1 April 1973 – 1 March 1982
Hsu Shih-hsien (許世賢)	1 March 1982 – 1 July 1982

=== Provincial City era ===
Independent Kuomintang Democratic Progressive Party

No.	Portrait	Name (Birth–Death)	Term of Office		Political Party	Term
1		Hsu Shih-hsien 許世賢; Xǔ Shìxián (1908–1983)	1 July 1982	1 July 1983	Independent	1
--		Chiang Ching-lin 江慶林; Jiāng Qìnglín (?-)	1 July 1983	15 December 1983	Kuomintang	1
2		Chang Po-ya 張博雅; Zhāng Bóyă (1942-)	15 December 1983	20 December 1985	Independent	1
2		Chang Po-ya 張博雅; Zhāng Bóyă (1942-)	20 December 1985	20 December 1989	Independent	2
3		Chang Wen-ying 張文英; Zhāng Wényīng (1938-)	20 December 1989	20 December 1993	Independent	3
3		Chang Wen-ying 張文英; Zhāng Wényīng (1938-)	20 December 1993	20 December 1997	Independent	4
4		Chang Po-ya 張博雅; Zhāng Bóyă (1942-)	20 December 1997	22 May 2000	Independent	5
--		Chen Li-chen 陳麗貞; Chén Lìzhēn (1958-)	22 May 2000	20 December 2001	Independent	5
5		Chen Li-chen 陳麗貞; Chén Lìzhēn (1958-)	20 December 2001	20 December 2005	Independent	6
		Chen Li-chen 陳麗貞; Chén Lìzhēn (1958-)	20 December 2001	20 December 2005	Democratic Progressive Party	6
6		Huang Min-hui 黃敏惠; Huáng Mǐnhuì (1959-)	20 December 2005	20 December 2009	Kuomintang	7
6		Huang Min-hui 黃敏惠; Huáng Mǐnhuì (1959-)	20 December 2009	25 December 2014	Kuomintang	8
7		Twu Shiing-jer 涂醒哲; Tú Xǐngzhé (1951-)	25 December 2014	25 December 2018	Democratic Progressive Party	9
(6)		Huang Min-hui 黃敏惠; Huáng Mǐnhuì (1959-)	25 December 2018	25 December 2022	Kuomintang	10
(6)		Huang Min-hui 黃敏惠; Huáng Mǐnhuì (1959-)	25 December 2022	Incumbent	Kuomintang	11
