= 32 Demands =

- Traditional Chinese: 三十二條處理大綱
- Simplified Chinese: 三十二条处理大纲
Transcriptions
Standard Mandarin
- Hanyu Pinyin: Sān shí èr tiáo chǔlǐ dàgāng
- Gwoyeu Romatzyh: San shyr ell tyau chuulii dahgang

The 32 Demands (Chinese: 三十二條處理大綱; pinyin: Sān shí èr tiáo chù lǐ dà gāng) were a list of proposals for governmental reform issued by the Committee to Settle the Monopoly Bureau Incident (also known as Settlement Committee, 228事件處理委員會 or People's Purge Committee) during the February 28 Incident which occurred in Taiwan in 1947.

== Events surrounding the demands ==
During the first week or so following the general uprising against Republic of China government authorities under Chief Executive Chen Yi, most of Taiwan was under the control of native Taiwanese under the guidance of the Settlement Committee and ROC. Governmental authority was limited to a few government compounds and garrisons. The Settlement Committee was composed of legislators, high school and college students, lawyers, doctors, labor unions, as well as members of the general public. Moderates in the committee hoped to bring about reform in the corrupt provincial administration as opposed to general rebellion against the ROC Central Government in Nanjing. Others talked of Taiwan independence or becoming a U.S. protectorate. In Pingtung, a band of them sang The Star-Spangled Banner as they took over the town.

Following several days of deliberations, Taiwanese representatives from across the island delivered a list of 32 demands to the Office of the Chief Executive on the evening of March 7, 1947. Through the proposed reforms, they hoped to eliminate the rampant corruption in the existing administration and bring about democratic reforms. There was a sense of urgency during the deliberations as the representatives feared that if reinforcement troops from mainland China arrived before the demands were delivered and announced, Chief Executive Chen would be highly unlikely to accept them in what would be for him a loss of face.

These fears were well founded as shortly afterwards ROC troops arrived from the mainland on the morning of March 9. Chief Executive Chen then began what became a massive crackdown against the native Taiwanese. The representatives of the Settlement Committee, as well as intellectuals and students were especially targeted for liquidation in the ensuing slaughter.

== Brief summary and explanation of the 32 Demands ==
=== Reforms for equality in government ===
- Enactment of a Provincial Autonomy Law which will serve as the highest law on the provincial level.
- All government commissioners (ministers) must be confirmed by a democratically elected Council.
- Elections for Council seats must be held before June 1947.
- At least 2/3 of the commissioners must be from people who have resided in Taiwan for more than ten years.
- Protection for civil liberties as well as the right of workers to strike. Abolishes requirements for the registration of newspapers.
- Removal of laws requiring that all candidates for public office be members of the Kuomintang.
- Provides reform on laws governing the eligibility to run for public office.
- Abolishment of the Office of the Chief Executive, to be replaced by a Provincial Government.

One of the major problems following the handover had been the production of many conflicting and often contradictory laws, many of which were created at the whim of corrupt government officials in order to extort bribes. The enactment of a Provincial Autonomy Law was designed to get rid of this tangle of corruption. The Chief Executive's Office especially was viewed to be extremely corrupt and undemocratic, as well as being subject to undue influence from the military.

Three of the 32 Demands were intended to prevent the installation of alleged carpetbaggers from the mainland to important government positions, as had been occurring since ROC administration of Taiwan began; as well as to prevent discrimination against residents of Taiwan prior to 1945.

Critics charge that such a scheme would create two classes of people, in effect creating second-class citizens and result in something resembling apartheid.

Reforms on eligibility laws were intended to create a more egalitarian process. In previous elections, all candidates had to deal with numerous regulations designed to discourage persons undesirable to the KMT from running for office, such as hefty registration fees, civil service exams, and "background checks".

=== Reforms to insure civil and property rights ===
- Popular election for all local government positions (i.e. mayors and magistrates), to be held before June 1947.
- Native Taiwanese were to be appointed as heads of police agencies, judges, and other members of the judicial system whenever possible.
- The civilian police are to be the only government agency with the power to arrest criminals.

All local officials up to this point were appointed by the Chief Executive, and as a result, were mostly mainlanders, sometimes accused of being "carpetbaggers". Most of the criminal justice system had been packed by mainland appointees, most of whom allegedly were neither familiar with nor cared much for Taiwanese interests.

These reforms would also prevent the use of the military for domestic law enforcement.

=== Economic reforms ===
- Only income taxes, luxury taxes, and inheritance taxes shall be levied.
- Public enterprises will be headed by Taiwanese.
- Provide for a system of inspection of public enterprises and disposal of former Japanese properties.
- Abolition of the Monopoly Bureau and state run monopolies.

Prior to these reforms, many government officials charged high taxes on most services, allegedly amounting to little more than organized graft. Certain items such as salt, tobacco, liquor, and camphor were restricted to production and sale by the government, leading to inflated prices. It was a conflict between the Monopoly Bureau agents and a cigarette vendor which sparked the outbreak of the February 28 Incident.

=== Military reforms ===
- Military Police are restricted to arresting only military personnel.
- As many Taiwanese as possible shall be assigned to fill military posts on Taiwan.
- Abolition of the Taiwan Garrison Command to prevent abuse of military privilege.

The Taiwanese had allegedly little interest in participating in the ongoing Chinese Civil War, especially since Taiwan's status at the time was still disputed by some. Troops from the mainland also had a reputation for being undisciplined and contemptuous towards Taiwanese.

=== Social welfare reforms ===
- Guarantee of the rights and privileges of the Taiwanese aborigines.
- Provides for workers' rights.
- Persons detained on charges of "war crimes" and "treason" are to be immediately released.

Many Taiwanese who were the targets of official extortion or had offended a corrupt government official were detained on vague charges of "aiding the Japanese" or treason.

=== Secondary demands subject to compromise ===
- Abolition of "Vocational Guidance Camps".
- The Central Government must pay for the sugar exported to the mainland by the Executive Yuan.
- The Central Government must pay for 150,000 tons of food exported to the mainland.

Taiwanese employees of companies or the government were often ordered to participate in lengthy "Vocational Guidance Camps" which were allegedly designed to get them away from work long enough so that their jobs could be replaced by mainland Chinese.

The last demand was due to an incident where the Central Government had gratuitously confiscated a large shipment of Taiwanese sugar without, then sold it on the mainland for significant profit. Similar situations also occurred with Taiwanese rice leading to major shortages and artificial price inflation.

== See also ==
- History of Taiwan
- History of the Republic of China
- Legal status of Taiwan

== External links and references ==
- Kerr, George H. (1992) [1965]. "Appendix I: The Thirty-two Demands". Formosa Betrayed. California: Taiwan Publishing Co. p. 475.
- "CHINA: Snow Red & Moon Angel". Time. 1947-04-07. "She was just a Formosan peasant's daughter, but she had been beautiful in her youth, when she went to Shanghai in the '20s and studied Communism. Now, at 46, after some advanced studies in Moscow and nine years in Jap prisons, she was tuberculous and no longer beautiful. But baggy-eyed, jug-eared Chinese General Chen Yi, looking back on the worst month of his Formosa governorship, would never forget the woman known as Hsieh Hsueh-hung—Thanks Snow Red. Chen blamed last month's Formosa rebellion on Snow Red. This was unduly modest of him; most of..."
- Kerr, George H.; Stuart, John Leighton (April 21, 1947). Memorandum on the Situation in Taiwan (Report). American Embassy, Nanking, China. Telegram No. 689. reprinted in Dean Acheson, ed. (August 1949). United States relations with China, with special reference to the period 1944-1949, based on the files of the Department of State. Far Eastern Series. Washington: U.S. Govt. Print. Off. pp. 923–938. hdl:2027/umn.31951d01115459w. OCLC 664471448.
