= Bo Yang =

Chinese author

Guo Dingsheng
- 郭定生
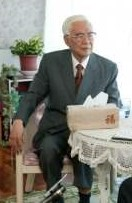
- Born: Guo Dingsheng; 7 March 1920; Kaifeng, Henan, Republic of China
- Died: 29 April 2008 (aged 88); Xindian, Taipei County (now Xindian District of New Taipei City), Republic of China
- Citizenship: Republic of China
- Education: Northeastern University
- Occupations: Historian, novelist, philosopher, poet
- Writing career
- Pen name: Boyang
- Language: Chinese
- Period: 1950–2008

Bo Yang (simplified Chinese: 柏杨; traditional Chinese: 柏楊; pinyin: Bó Yáng; (Note: The character 柏 is traditionally pronounced "Bó," and Bo Yang himself pronounced it as Bó. In Modern Standard Chinese (mainland Chinese), some authorities favour the view that it is pronounced as "Bó" except when used to mean "cypress tree," when it is pronounced "Bǎi" while other authorities favour the view that 柏 is pronounced as "Bǎi" when used as a surname. Bo Yang himself always pronounced it as "Bo".) 7 March 1920 – 29 April 2008), sometimes also erroneously called Bai Yang, was a Chinese historian, novelist, philosopher, poet based in Taiwan. He is also regarded as a social critic. His best-known work is The Ugly Chinaman, a controversial book that was banned in mainland China until the year 2000; in it he harshly criticized Chinese culture and the national character of Chinese people. According to his own memoir, the exact date of his birthday was unknown even to himself. He later adopted 7 March, the date of his 1968 imprisonment, as his birthday.

== Biography ==
Boyang was born as Guō Dìngshēng (郭定生) in Kaifeng, Henan Province, China, with family origins in Huixian. Boyang's father changed his son's name to Guō Lìbāng (郭立邦) to facilitate a transfer to another school. Bo Yang later changed his name to Guo Yìdòng, also spelled Kuo I-tung (郭衣洞). In high school, Boyang participated in youth organisations of the Kuomintang, the then-ruling party of the Republic of China, and joined the Kuomintang itself in 1938. He graduated from the National Northeastern University, and moved to Taiwan after the Kuomintang lost the civil war in 1949.

In 1950, he was imprisoned for six months for listening to Communist Chinese radio broadcasts. He had various jobs during his life, including that of a teacher. During this time, he began to write novels. In 1960, he began using the pen name Boyang when he started to write a political commentary column in the Independent Evening News. The name was derived from a place name in the mountains of Taiwan; he adopted it because he liked the sound of it. In 1961, he achieved acclaim with his novel The Alien Realm (異域 Yìyù), which told the story of a Kuomintang force which fought on in the borderlands of southwestern China long after the government had retreated to Taiwan; it was later adapted into the film A Home Too Far. He became director of the Pingyuan Publishing House in 1966, and also edited the cartoon page of China Daily (中華日報).

Boyang was arrested again in 1967 because of his sarcastic "unwitting" criticism of Taiwan's dictator Chiang Kai-shek and in particular a translation of a comic strip of Popeye. In the strip, Popeye and Swee'Pea have just landed on an uninhabited island. Popeye says: "You can be crown prince," to which Swee'Pea responds, "I want to be president." In the next panel, Popeye says, "Why, you little..." In the final panel, Popeye's words are too faint to be made out. Chiang was displeased because he saw this as a parody of his arrival (with a defeated army) in Taiwan, his brutal usurpation of the presidency (a KMT competitor favored as head of government by the Truman administration was executed) and his strategy of slowly installing his son Chiang Ching-kuo as heir apparent. Boyang translated the word "fellows" as "my fellow soldiers and countrymen," a phrase used by Chiang Kai-shek. Having detained Bo Yang, the KMT's "military interrogators told him that he could be beaten to death at any time the authorities desired" when the writer refused to swallow their trumped-up charges. "Several interrogators" including Liu Chan-hua and Kao Yi-rue "played cat and mouse with him, alternating promise of immediate release with threats" and torture. In order to make him confess, they broke his leg. Western allies of the regime were not unaware of this. (Note: Chiang Wei-kuo 蔣緯國, a son of the dictator in charge of the Military Garrison Command, had been attending an equivalent of West Point in Germany during the Third Reich period and the BND, a West German secret service, commanded by a high-ranking former Nazi secret service man, Mr. Gehlen, always had close relations with its counterpart in Taiwan, according to a press notice by the West German newspaper Frankfurter Rundschau. The same was obviously true of the American counterpart. In the late 1940s, the US vice consul in Taipei, George H. Kerr, who later expressed regrets, was also fully aware of the massacres carried out by the KMT regime, estimating that about 10,000 of the demonstrators protesting against corruption, harassment and unrestrained violence of the police on Feb. 28, 1947 were killed on that day and in the next few days, and another 10,000 in the immediate aftermath of the crackdown.) Shelley Rigger says that "Peng Ming-min, Bo Yang and Lei Chen" were "high-profile White Terror cases" in the 1960s but in fact, many "(t)housands of Taiwanese and Mainlanders were swept up by the White Terror, suffering imprisonment, torture, (…) execution." (Note: Prof. Peng Ming-min, whose father had been executed by the regime in the context of the February 28 Incident, became a victim in 1964 because he and his colleagues at Taida wrote a manifesto calling for reforms.) The prosecutor initially sought the death sentence but due to US pressure this was reduced to twelve years in the Green Island concentration camp. From 1969 Bo Yang was incarcerated as a political prisoner (for "being a Communist agent and attacking national leaders") on Green Island for nine years. The original 12-year sentence was commuted to eight years after the death of Chiang Kai-shek in 1975. However, the government refused to release Bo Yang after his sentence expired, and released him only in 1977, giving in to pressure from international organizations such as Amnesty International. After his release, Bo Yang continued to campaign for human rights and democracy in Taiwan. Towards the end of his life Bo Yang stated in his memoirs that he did not have the slightest intention to insult Chiang Kai-shek with his Popeye translation. This was due to the fact that in his view objective criticism mattered whereas personal insults were irrelevant.

=== Works ===
Lin Zi-yao notes that during his life "Bo Yang covered a wide range of subjects from culture, literature, politics and education to love, marriage, family planning, fashion and women." Much of this is not fiction, although he also published a significant body of short stories, novels, and poetry. Howard Goldblatt says that "it is significant" that an anthology of his short stories entitled Secrets in English was "published in Chinese under the author's true name Kuo I-tung, for 'Bo Yang' is not essentially a writer of fiction." Goldblatt adds, "Yet like 'Bo Yang' [the writer of essays], Kuo I-tung [the novelist and short story writer] is a social critic; his fiction is written with an eye to the recording of events and to the social inequities that gave rise to them."

Aside from his Golden Triangle novel The Alien Realm, (Yiyu 異域, 1961), Boyang is best known for his non-fiction works on Chinese history (collated and translated into modern colloquial Chinese from historical records in the prison library on Green Island) and The Ugly Chinaman (醜陋的中國人 Chǒulòu de Zhōngguórén, 1985; English translation, with the subtitle ... and the Crisis of Chinese Culture, 1992). In the introduction to excerpts from The Ugly Chinaman, the editors of an anthology entitled Sources of Chinese Tradition from 1600 through the Twentieth Century state that "(t)he sharply negative tone of the (…) essay reflects a sense of (…) despair (…) as well as a feeling that age-old weaknesses have persisted through revolutionary change." Also referring to The Ugly Chinaman, Rana Mitter says that Bo Yang's position as a critical observer and analyst of the world is similar to Lu Xun's. Both were skeptical, yet committed writers and less naive than younger 'romanticists'.

Lu Xun regarded his mission as being to try and wake up a few of the sleepers in an 'iron house' in which they were burning to death, and from which there was still no guarantee to escape. The message mixed bleakness with hope, with perhaps more emphasis on bleakness. In contrast, the impatience of the romanticists was for a better world which they felt they could almost touch; they just had to motivate the nation and the people to reach it. A similar division can be seen in the treatment of modern China in (…) more contemporary works. Bo Yang's account of the Chinese people is dark and suggests that a long, painful process will be necessary before China will be saved. (…) Bo Yang (like Lu Xun) made his criticism while declining to join a political party. Again, like Lu Xun, Bo Yang was of an older generation when his essay [The Ugly Chinaman] was finally published (65 years old)...

Edward M. Gunn agrees, saying that "(t)he fact that Bo Yang is a prolific author of satirical essays (zawen) inevitably recalls the work of Lu Xun." Gunn also emphasizes Bo Yang's "particular interest in history" and the "acerbic wit in defense of democracy and social welfare" (or social rights of the common people). (Note: Considering the fact that Lu Xun's writing were described as subversive and remained inaccessible to almost every citizen in Taiwan due to the ban on printing or possessing them, it is obvious that Bo Yang's Lu Xun'esque wit had to cause trouble for him under dictators like Chiang Kai-shek and his son, Chiang Ching-kuo.)

Bo Yang gained attention internationally when a volume of poetry entitled Poems of a Period was published in Hong Kong in 1986. These poems recall his arrest and imprisonment.

=== Later years ===
Bo Yang lived in Taipei in his later years. He became the founding president of the Taiwan chapter of Amnesty International. In 1994, Boyang underwent heart surgery, and his health never fully recovered. He carried the honorary title of national policy advisor to the administration of President Chen Shui-bian. In 2006, Boyang retired from writing, and donated the bulk of his manuscripts to the Chinese Modern Literature Museum in Beijing. He was awarded an honorary doctorate by the National Tainan University, to which he also donated many memorabilia and some manuscripts.

Boyang died of pneumonia in a hospital near his Xindian residence on 29 April 2008. He was married five times, and is survived by his last wife, Chang Hsiang-hua, and five children born by his former wives. On 17 May 2008, his ashes were scattered along the seashore of Green Island, where he was once imprisoned.

== Literature (a selection) ==
Bo Yang Museum in Tainan, Taiwan.

=== Essays and historical research by Bo Yang ===
- Bo, Yang 柏楊 (2009). Choulou de zhongguoren 醜陋的中國人 [The Ugly Chinaman]. Taipei: Yuanliu chuban 遠流出版.; English translation (1992) The Ugly Chinaman and the Crisis of Chinese Culture by Don J. Cohn and Jing Qing, published by Allen & Unwin, ISBN 1863731164
- Bo, Yang 柏楊 (2002). Zhongguo ren shi gang 中國人史綱 [History of the Chinese People]. Taipei: Yuanliu chuban 遠流出版.
- Bo, Yang 柏楊 (1998). Bo Yang yue: du tong jian. lun li shi 柏楊曰 : 讀通鑑.論歷史 [Bo Yang about reading chronicles. Reflections on History]. Taipei: Yuanliu 遠流.
- Bo, Yang 柏楊 (1994). Zhong guo ren, ni shou le sheng me zu zhou! 中國人, 你受了什麼詛咒! [Chinese people, what curse fell on you?]. Taipei: Xingguang 星光 Starlight.
- Bo, Yang 柏楊 (1994). Zhongguo lishi nian biao 中國歷史年表 [Chronology of Chinese History]. Taipei: Yuesheng wenhua chuban : San you zong jing xiao 躍昇文化出版 : 三友總經銷.
- Bo, Yang 柏楊 (1992). The Ugly Chinaman and the Crisis of Chinese Culture. Translated by Cohn, Don J.; Qing, Jing. North Sydney: Allen and Unwin.
- Bo, Yang 柏楊 (1992). "The Chinese Cursed". In Barmé, Geremie (ed.). New Ghosts, Old Dreams. Chinese Rebel Voices. New York: Times Books. pp. 210–215.
- Bo, Yang 柏楊 (1989). Da nanren sha wen zhuyi 大男人沙文主義 [On Male Chauvinism]. Taipei: Yue sheng chu ban 躍昇出版) and Chungho, Taipei Hsien (San you zong jing xiao 三友總經銷.
- Bo, Yang 柏楊 (1987). Shui zai shuo zhen hua: yi jiu ba liu Taiwan xian shi pipan 誰在說真話 : 一九八六臺灣現實批判 [Who is telling the truth: one thousand nine hundred eighty-six realistic criticisms of Taiwan]. Kaohsiung: Dun li chu ban she 敦理出版社.

=== Prose fiction and poetry by Bo Yang ===
- Bo, Yang 柏楊 (1996). The alien realm. London: Janus. – Fiction.
- Bo, Yang 柏楊 (1988). A farewell: a collection of short stories. Transl. by Robert Reynolds. Hong Kong: Joint Pub. (H.K.).
- Bo, Yang 柏楊 (1988). Bo Yang xiaoshuo xuandu 柏楊小說選讀 [Bo Yang: Selected Prose]. Taipei: Huangguan皇冠. – Fiction.
- Bo, Yang 柏楊 (1987). Wang le ta shi shei 忘了他是誰 [I forgot who he is]. Taipei: Lin bai林白.
- Bo, Yang 柏楊 (1986). Poems of A Period. Hong Kong: Joint Publishing.
- Bo, Yang 柏楊 (1979). Bo Yang xiaoshuo xuan ji 柏杨小说选集 [Bo Yang, Selected Works: Prose]. Hong Kong: Zongheng chubanshe纵横出版社 Aspect Press. – Fiction.

=== On Bo Yang ===
- Zhang, Qingrong 張清榮 (2007). 柏楊與監獄文學 [Bo Yang and prison literature]. 柏楊學術國際研討會 (Bo Yang International Academic Symposium). Tainan: Tainan University (published 2008).
- Li, Huoren 黎活仁 (2000). Bo Yang de sixiang yu wenxue 柏楊的思想與文學 [The thought & literary works of Bo Yang]. Taipei: Yuanliu chubanshi ye gongsi.
- Mitter, Rana (2005) [2004]. A Bitter Revolution: China's Struggle with the Modern World. Oxford UK; New York NY: Oxford University Press. p. 270. ISBN 978-0-19-280605-5.
- Wang, Xiaolu (2005). "Bo Yang". In Davis, Edward L. (ed.). Encyclopedia of Contemporary Chinese Culture. Abingdon UK: Routledge. p. 62. ISBN 0-415-24129-4.
- Ritter, Jurgen (1987). Kulturkritik in Taiwan: Po Yang [Bo Yang]. Bochum: Brockmeyer.
- editorial board, ed. (1984). Bo Yang 65: yi ge zao qi de chong er 柏楊65 : 一個早起的蟲兒 [Bo Yang, 65: An Early Riser]. Taipei: Xingguang deng chuban : Wu shi tu shu zong jing xiao 星光等出版 : 吳氏圖書總經銷.

== See also ==
- Bo Yang Museum
