= The First 228 Peace Memorial Monument =

Public sculpture in Taiwan

- 嘉義市二二八紀念公園二二八紀念碑
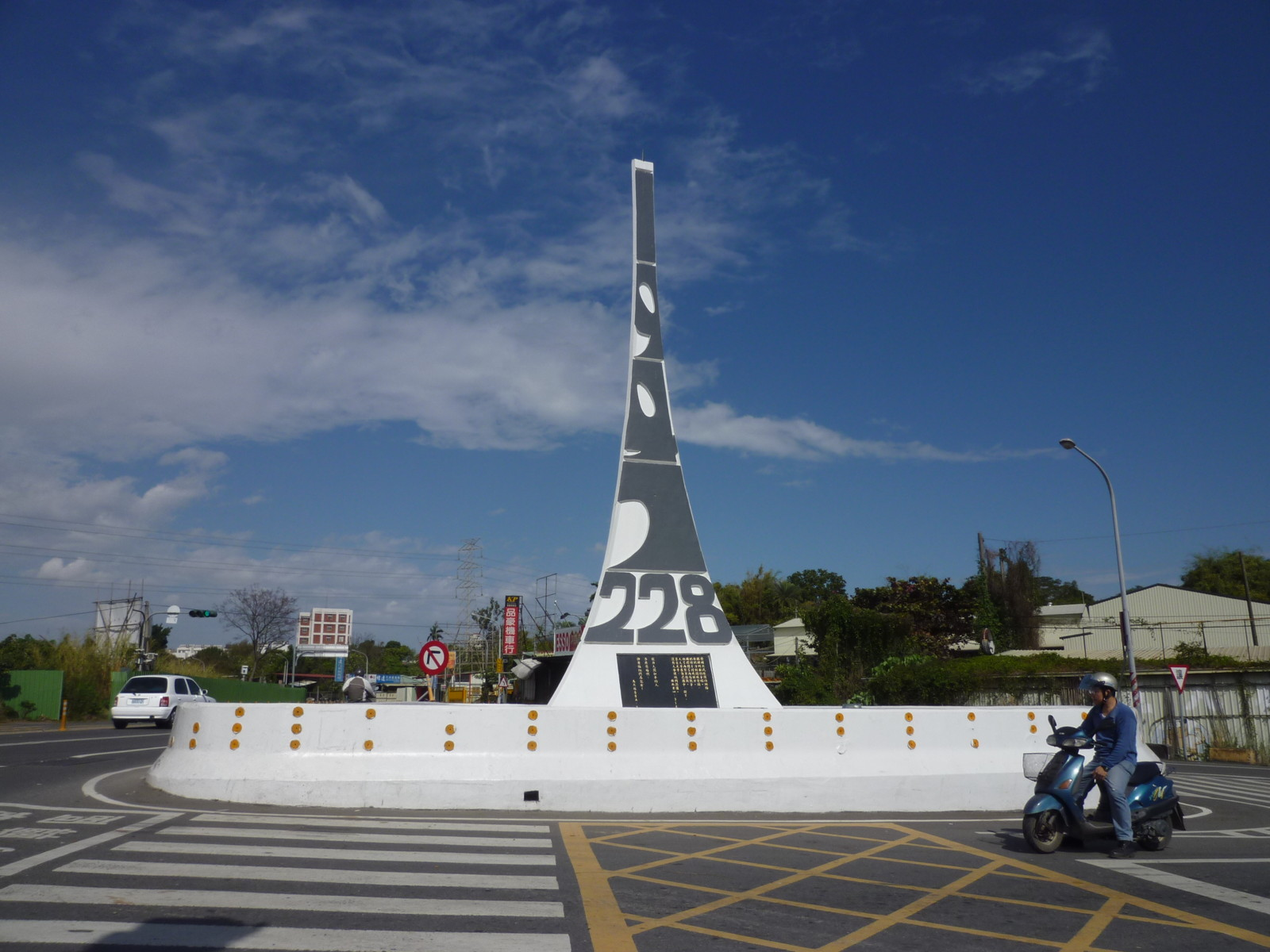
- Location: East, Chiayi City, Taiwan
- Type: Memorial monument
- Opening date: 1989
- Restored date: 2017

The First 228 Peace Memorial Monument (traditional Chinese: 嘉義市二二八紀念公園二二八紀念碑; simplified Chinese: 嘉义市二二八纪念公园二二八纪念碑; pinyin: Jiāyì Shì Èr'èrbā Jìniàn Gōngyuán Èr'èrbā Jìniànbēi) is a monument in East District, Chiayi City, Taiwan. It was built in 1989, making it the earliest 228 Memorial Monument built in the island. It is the only 228 Memorial Monument to have been built before the 1990s. It was built as a memorial of the February 28 Incident of 1947, in which more than 10,000 Taiwan residents were killed during an uprising against the government. The monument is one of the landmarks of Chiayi City.

== Memorial Building ==
There are more than ten memorials commemorating the February 28 Incident in Taiwan. The most famous one is located at 228 Peace Memorial Park in Taipei. However, the first 228 Memorial Monument is arguably the most valuable, and the only monument of its kind built in the 1980s. It is located at Mituo Road, East District, Chiayi City and was designed by San-Yuen Chan, who had been imprisoned for anti-Kuomintang activity in 1981. The monument was completed on August 19, 1989 under the leadership of then Chiayi City Mayor, Chang Po-ya.

== Location ==
This monument was established at Mituo Road (彌陀路) in Chiayi City, which close to the boundary between Chiayi City and Zhongpu Township, Chiayi County originally. In 2017, to facilitate the Widening Project of Mituo Road, the Memorial Monument was moved to Chiayi City 228 Memorial Park, which is located at the intersection of Mituo Road, Qiming Road (啟明路), and Gongyi Road (公義路) .

== Inscriptions ==
There are 3 inscriptions engraved on the surface of the 228 Peace Memorial Monument:

Inscription of 228 Peace Memorial Monument：

After World War II, Taiwan from Japan ruled that liberal democracy. Who would have expected the Chinese regime received Taiwan, Chen Yi ranks corruption and incompetence, privilege run amok, coupled with postwar economic system broken, high prices, resulting in Taiwanese people lives difficult, groaning and complaining road, around the voice of resistance. On February 27, 1947 in Taipei, Tataocheng officials to check smuggling of cigarettes, savage injured trafficked women, complex and shot and killed protesting citizens. The next day 28 Taipei residents petition as well as by machine gun fire, causing Taiwan people's uprising, and called for a thorough reform of the "228 incident". Chen at first pretend to make a compromise, but private Chinese troops. Army landed shortly after terrorist massacre and clear throughout the island, causing Taiwan's elite countless casualties, from victimization 40 years no one dared to be comforted. Today I built the monument commemorate the cause must first be sacrificed, and praying for a son to remember the lessons of history, vows Taiwan permanent righteousness, peace, and never allow such tragedy to happen.

August 19th, 1989

Construction Process of 228 Peace Memorial Monument：

The 228 incident in 1947, is Taiwan most unfortunate tragedy in recent history. Historical scars to heal and promote Taiwan social justice of the peace, since 1987, has dozens of overseas Taiwan groups, co-sponsored the 228 peace promotion Association, called on the Government to publish the truth, redress grievances and comfort the families of the victims, the construction of the monument, its 228 Peace Memorial Day After three years of hard work, 228 justice peace movement get Taiwan enthusiastic response of civil society, human rights groups, academics, churches, Aboriginal people, women, students, democracy activists and the families of the victims, completion, submission, the media have put the Taiwan people's hearts reconstruction, and construction began on May 9, 1989 construction. Is an Taiwan first 228 monument, to be completed on August 19 of the same year.

Written respectfully by The 228 Peace Memorial Monument Preparatory Committee

"The Bible" Micah IV: 3-4 & Matthew Book V: 9

And he shall judge among many people, and rebuke strong nations afar off;

and they shall beat their swords into plowshares, and their spears into pruninghooks:
nation shall not lift up a sword against nation,
neither shall they learn war any more.
But they shall sit every man under his vine and under his fig tree;
and none shall make them afraid: for the mouth of the Lord of hosts hath spoken it.

－Micah IV: 3-4

Happy are the peacemakers:

for they will be named sons of God.
－Book of Matthew V: 9

== See also ==
- Peace Memorial Day
