= Formosa Betrayed =

Formosa Betrayed may refer to:

- Formosa Betrayed (book), a 1965 book by George H. Kerr
- Formosa Betrayed (film), a 2009 film directed by Adam Kane
