= Bo Yang Museum =

Museum in West Central, Tainan, Taiwan

- 柏楊文物館
- Established: 27 June 2007
- Location: West Central, Tainan, Taiwan
- Coordinates: 22°59′05″N 120°12′29″E
- Type: museum
- Public transit access: Tainan Station

The Bo Yang Museum (traditional Chinese: 柏楊文物館; simplified Chinese: 柏楊文物馆; pinyin: Bóyáng Wénwùguǎn) is a museum in West Central District, Tainan, Taiwan. The museum is part of the National University of Tainan (NUTN) and it is dedicated to the Taiwan-based, Chinese writer Bo Yang.

== History ==
The initial discussion about returning Bo Yang's belongings started in November 2006. The room for keeping his collections was inaugurated on 21 March 2007. The Ministry of Education approved the subsidy to set up Bo Yang Museum on 8 May 2007. The museum was finally inaugurated on 27 June 2007.

== Architecture ==
The museum is a two-story building, located at the Special Art District of NUTN. It is divided into four sections, which are Bo Yang Art Center, Bo Yang Historical Section, Bo Yang Literature Corner and Bo Yang's Garden House Living Room.

== Transportation ==
The museum is accessible within walking distance south from Tainan Station of the Taiwan Railway.

== See also ==
- List of museums in Taiwan
