= Chiayi Municipal Museum =

Museum in East, Chiayi City, Taiwan

- 嘉義市立博物館
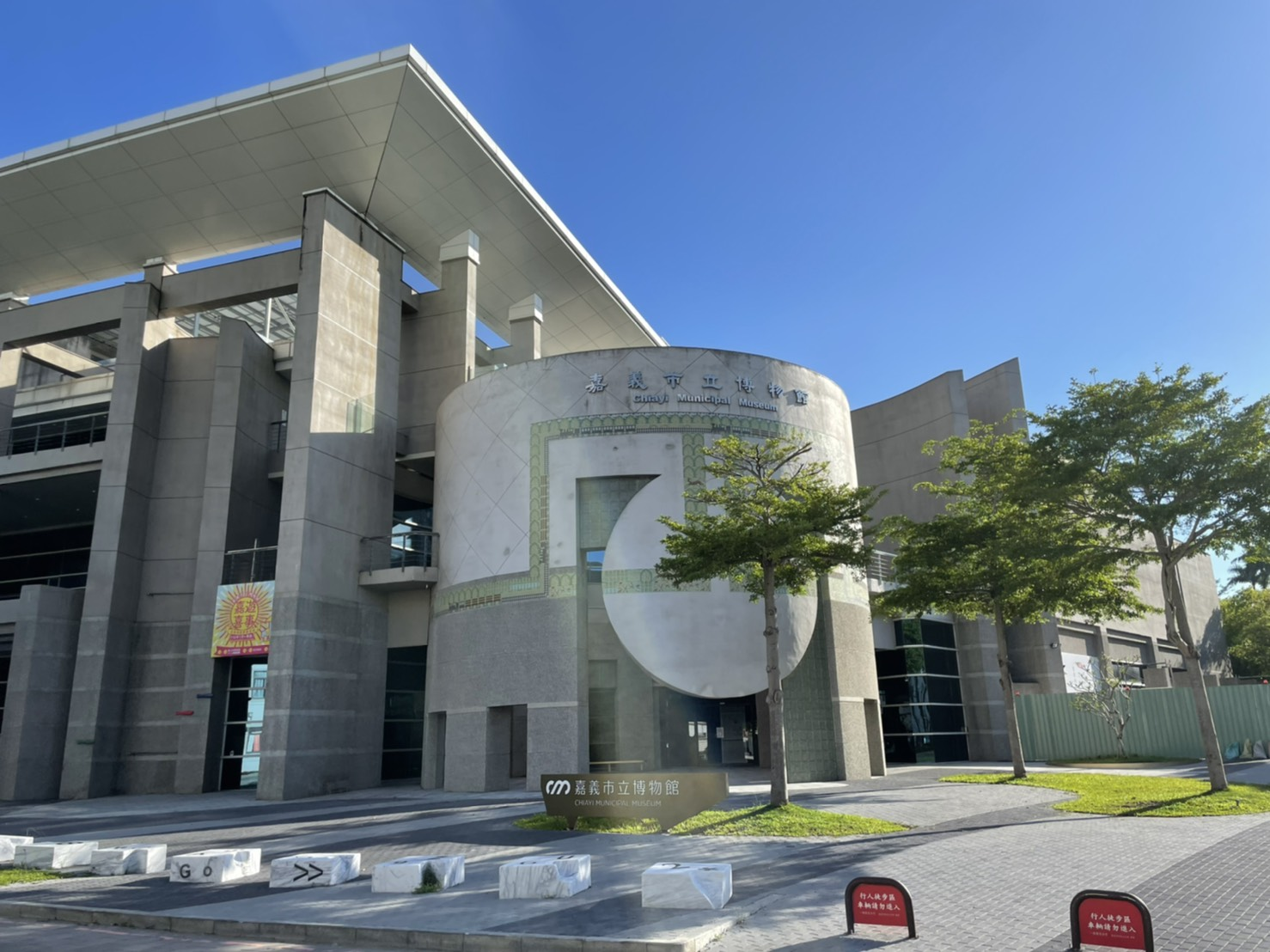
- Established: 9 March 2004
- Location: East, Chiayi City, Taiwan
- Coordinates: 23°29′13″N 120°27′05″E
- Type: museum
- Public transit access: Beimen Station
- Website: Official website (in Chinese)

The Chiayi Municipal Museum (traditional Chinese: 嘉義市立博物館; simplified Chinese: 嘉义市立博物馆; pinyin: Jiāyì Shìlì Bówùguǎn) is a museum in East District, Chiayi City, Taiwan.

== History ==
The founding of the museum was a collective community effort in the hope to establish a cultural public space for all of the residents of Chiayi City. Among its displays are silk wrappings used to cover Tibetan Buddhist texts and an Islamic jade collection of the Qing emperors.

== Exhibitions ==
The museum has the following galleries:

- Geological Hall
- Fossil Hall
- Fine Arts Gallery

== Activities ==
The museum offers courses and workshops in calligraphy, brush ink painting, paper mache, illustration, ikebana with a Taiwanese touch etc.

== Transportation ==
The museum is accessible within walking distance west from Beimen Station of the Alishan Forest Railway.

== See also ==
- List of museums in Taiwan
