= Julie Wu =

American novelist (born 1967)

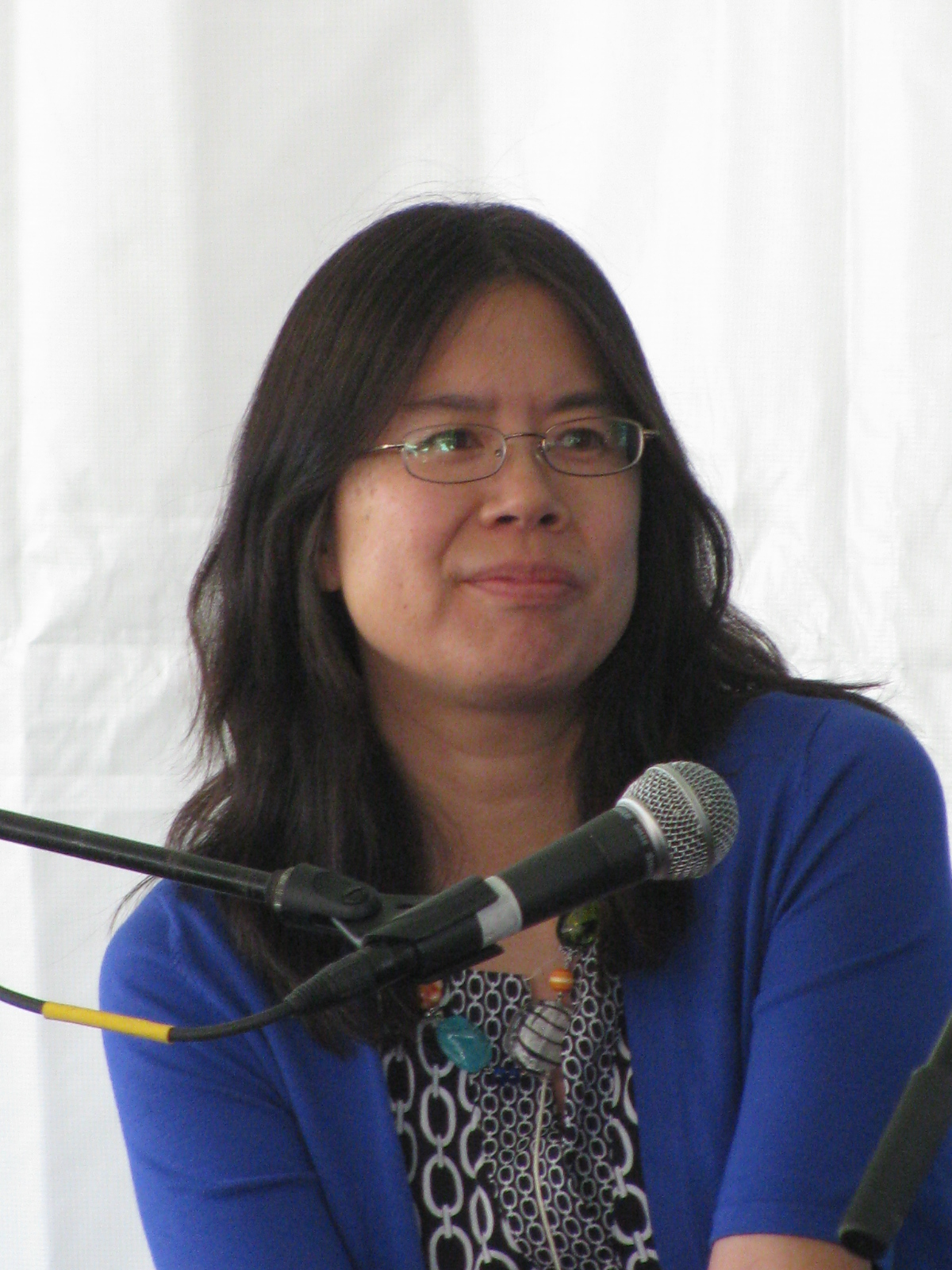
- Wu (2014) reading at the Gaithersburg Book Festival
- Born: April 2, 1967 (age 59)
- Education: Harvard University (BA); Columbia University (MD)
- Occupation: Novelist
- Writing career
- Genres: Literary fiction, historical fiction
- Notable work: The Third Son (2013)
- Website: juliewuauthor.com

Julie Wu (born April 2, 1967) is a Taiwanese-American novelist and physician. She is the author of the novel The Third Son (2013), published by Algonquin Books.

== Biography ==
Wu was born on April 2, 1967, to a Taiwanese American family. She graduated magna cum laude from Harvard University with a Bachelor of Arts (B.A.) degree in literature, then earned a Doctor of Medicine (M.D.) from the Columbia College of Physicians and Surgeons.

Wu entered the medical field partly because she believed that a medical career would benefit her as a writer. She completed her residency in internal medicine and then began practicing as a primary care physician. Wu then closed her medical practice upon wanting to focus her time on her writing and on her children. Wu is also a recipient of a 2012 Massachusetts Cultural Council fellowship, and has also received a writing grant from the Vermont Studio Center. She was once enrolled at the Indiana University at Bloomington master's program in vocal performance.

Wu wrote and published The Third Son in 2013, via Algonquin Books. Upon researching the political history of Taiwan and learning of the "2/28", Wu decided to write a novel that communicated the experience of the Taiwanese under Japanese rule and bridged the silence surrounding this time period. The novel revolves around a boy named Saburo and is set against the backdrop of occupied 1950s Taiwan and America at the dawn of the space age. Wu stated that the inspiration for her debut novel evolved first from an initial desire to write the "Great American Novel" to a desire to provide a voice for the Taiwanese and their history. Wu ultimately wanted to write a story that would educate the American public stating that, "...[the novel] evolved partly from [my parents'] story but...I really fictionalized it...so that it would introduce people who wouldn't normally learn about Taiwanese history to Taiwanese history." The novel received positive reviews from The Boston Globe, O the Oprah Magazine, Kirkus Reviews, The Christian Science Monitor, Shelf Awareness and more.
