= Mud River (novel) =

Novel by Chen Yeh

Mud River (Chinese: 泥河) is a novel by Taiwanese author and women's rights activist Chen Yeh (陳燁), originally named Chen Chun-hsiu (陳春秀). Published after Taiwan’s lift of martial law, it’s a collection of stories that presents the 228 Incident. The book is divided into three parts and is set against the backdrop of the Tainan Canal, focusing on three generations of a prominent family in Tainan, spanning from the Japanese occupation period to the 1980s. The story delves into themes of family conflicts, romantic relationships, and historical consciousness, showcasing political concerns and critiques rarely seen in women's writing. The entire work employs techniques of Surrealism, using techniques such as hyper-realism, stream of consciousness, symbolism, and impressionism to illustrate how the traumatic memories of the storyteller linger like a haunting specter after being repressed. The oppression of gender and nation in Taiwanese history is intertwined, with the characters repeatedly reliving nightmares that mirror the brutal memories of the 228 Incident. This suggests that if the 228 Incident, as a public memory, does not undergo collective healing, it could become a source of mutual hatred among Taiwanese people. Additionally, if the grievances of the victims are not addressed, they could also transform into animosity.

The background of the book's creation coincides with Taiwan's lifting of martial law in 1987. In the same year, the 228 Peace Promotion Association was established, and Taiwanese society began to loosen its taboos on the 228 Incident and the White Terror era. Since related historical materials were still restricted at the time, Yang Tsui (楊翠), a professor in the Department of Sinophone Literatures at Tunghai University, compared the situation to the "dense fog" which the protagonist's memories couldn't penetrate. Similarly, the historical truth of the 228 Incident remains difficult to clarify and understand to this day.
