= Water Source Water Meter Room =

Former water meter room in East, Chiayi City, Taiwan

- 水源地水錶室
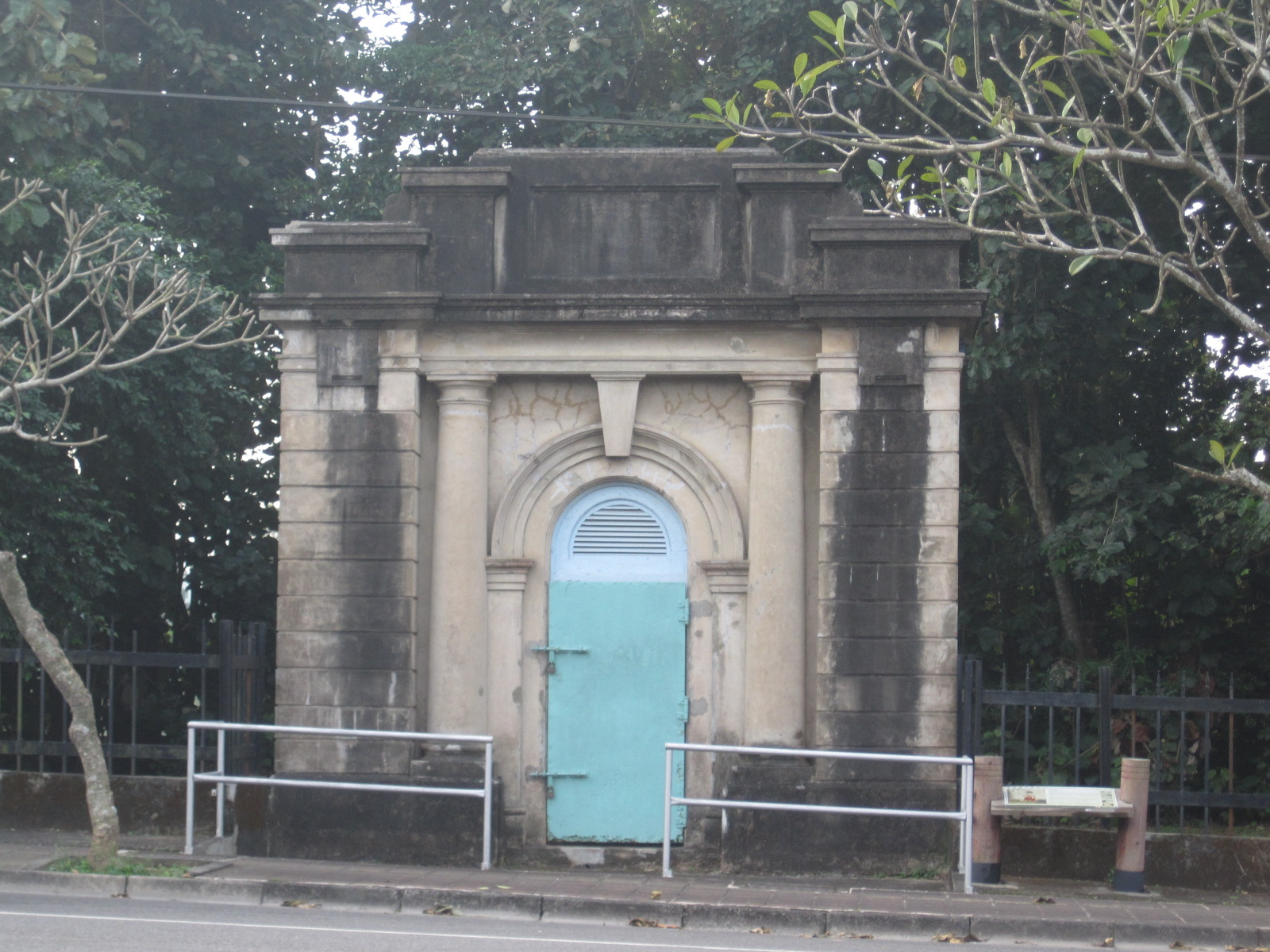
- Interactive map of the Water Source Water Meter Room area

General information
- Type: former water meter room
- Location: East, Chiayi City, Taiwan
- Coordinates: 23°29′03.0″N 120°28′15.0″E
- Completed: 1910

The Water Source Water Meter Room (traditional Chinese: 水源地水錶室; simplified Chinese: 水源地水表室; pinyin: Shuǐyuán Dì Shuǐbiǎo Shì) is a former water meter room in East District, Chiayi City, Taiwan.

== History ==
The Chiayi waterway was constructed between July 1911 and March 1914 as part of the city waterway facilities. The room which houses the metering facility to measure the water flow was built in 1910 as the Water Meter Room. In 1954, water plants around Chiayi County (which then include Chiayi City at that time) were combined into the Chiayi Water Plant, with the exception of Puzi Water Plant. The Water Meter Room was then also renamed as Water Source Water Meter Room. The land where the meter room is located belongs to the forestry industry and due to the lack of access road to the room building, it was covered with plants and trees. However, due to the road widening nearby the structure, the meter room was revealed.

== Architecture ==
The meter room was constructed with Baroque structure with thick pillars and simple gables.

== See also ==
- List of tourist attractions in Taiwan
- Water supply and sanitation in Taiwan
