= February 28 incident =

1947 uprising in Taiwan

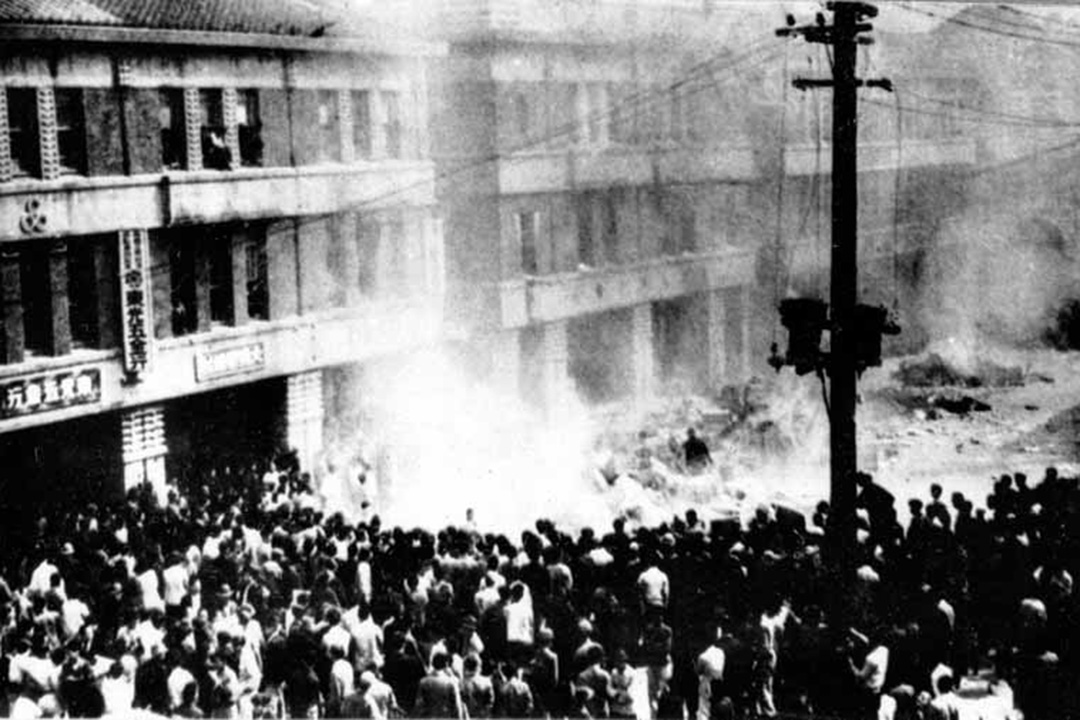
- On February 28, 1947, crowds gathered at the Tobacco Monopoly Bureau's Taipei branch to protest. Its inventories were piled up and burned
- Date: February 27 – May 16, 1947
- Location: Taiwan and Penghu Islands
- Caused by: Political discrimination and corruption; Economic control by mainlanders; economic hardship; Social unrest; ethnic conflict
- Goals: Political and economic reform
- Methods: Demonstrations, negotiations, weapons collection, takeovers, armed protests
- Result: Military repression, casualties, and disappearances; Fear and indifference to politics; deepened ethnic divisions; Martial law in Taiwan and the White Terror, which lasted until 1987

Parties
Nationalist government: Kuomintang	Protesters

Lead figures
(Taiwan) Chiang Kai-shek (Taiwan) Chen Yi	Lin Mosei (executed); Chen Cheng-po (executed)

Casualties
- Deaths: Unknown. A 1992 government report estimated between 18,000 and 28,000

February 28 incident
- Chinese: 二二八事件
Transcriptions
Standard Mandarin
- Hanyu Pinyin: Èrèrbā Shìjiàn
- Bopomofo: ㄦ` ㄦ` ㄅㄚ ㄕ` ㄐㄧㄢ`
- Gwoyeu Romatzyh: Ellellba Shyhjiann
- Wade–Giles: Erh⁴-erh⁴-pa¹ Shih⁴-chien⁴
Southern Min
- Hokkien POJ: Jī-jī-pat sū-kiāⁿ
- Tâi-lô: Jī-jī-pat sū-kiānn

February 28 Massacre
- Traditional Chinese: 二二八大屠殺
- Simplified Chinese: 二二八大屠杀
Transcriptions
Standard Mandarin
- Hanyu Pinyin: Èrèrbā Dàtúshā
- Gwoyeu Romatzyh: Ellellba Datwusha
- Wade–Giles: Erh⁴-erh⁴-pa¹ Ta⁴-t'u²-sha¹
Southern Min
- Hokkien POJ: Jī-jī-pat tōa-tô͘-sat
- Tâi-lô: Jī-jī-pat tūa-tôo-sat

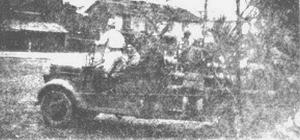
Armed soldiers as seen in Tainan by Dr. M. Ottsen, who served for the United Nations

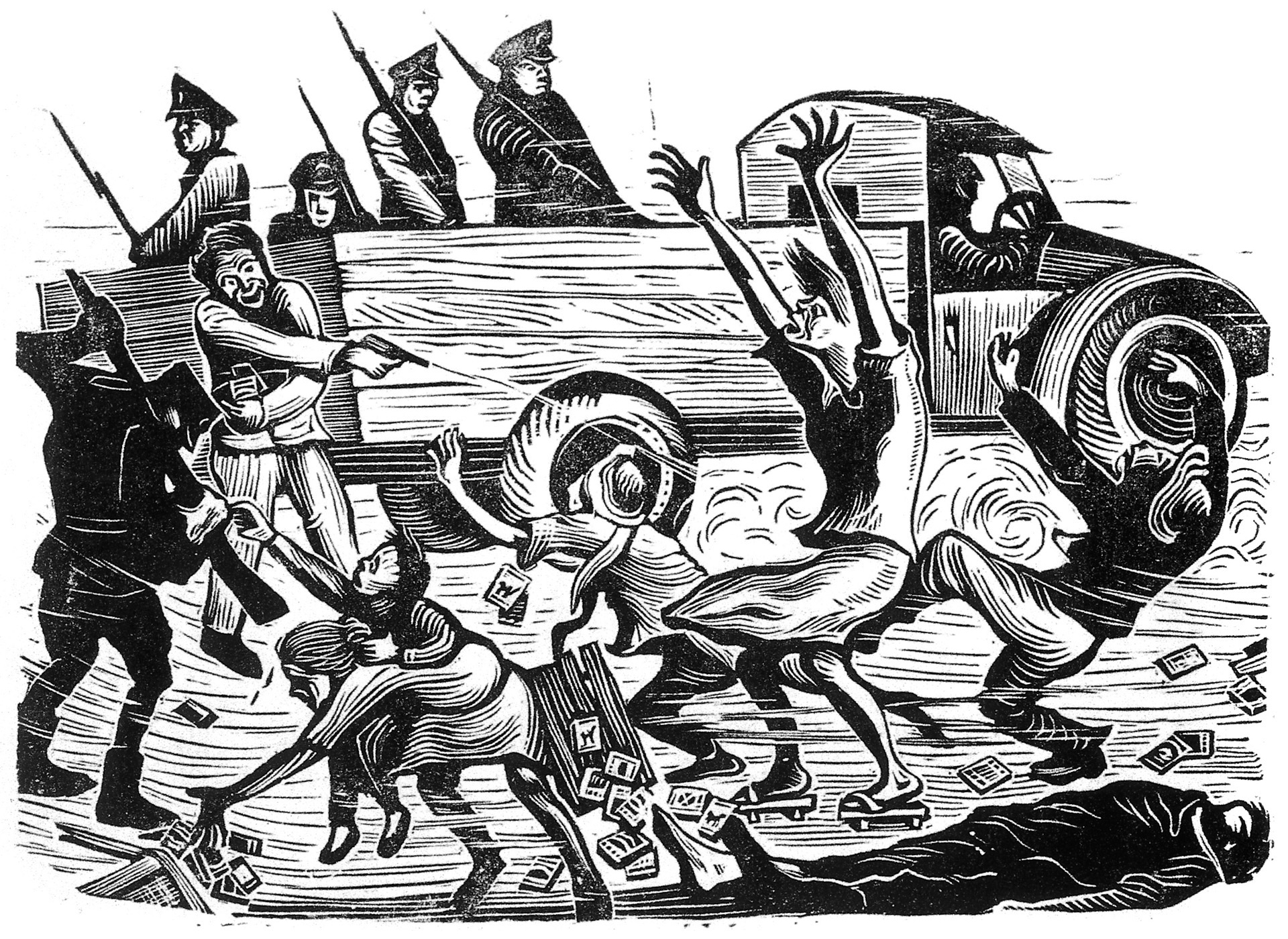
Woodcut The Terrible Inspection by Huang Rong-can

The February 28 incident (also called the February 28 massacre, the 228 incident, or the 228 massacre) was an anti-government uprising in Taiwan in 1947 that was violently suppressed by the Kuomintang–led Nationalist government of the Republic of China (ROC). Directed by provincial governor Chen Yi and President Chiang Kai-shek, thousands of civilians were killed beginning on February 28. While the event is primarily characterized by the military crackdown, the initial stages involved widespread civil unrest and violence directed against innocent Mainland civilians. Historical research also indicates that various groups, including members of the Communist Party, participated in the uprising. The incident is considered one of the most important events in Taiwan's modern history and was a critical impetus for the Taiwan independence movement.

In 1945, following the surrender of Japan at the end of World War II, the Allies handed administrative control of Taiwan over to China, thus ending 50 years of Japanese colonial rule. Local residents became resentful of what they saw as high-handed and frequently corrupt conduct on the part of the Kuomintang (KMT) authorities, including the arbitrary seizure of private property, economic mismanagement, and exclusion from political participation. The flashpoint came on February 27, 1947, in Taipei, when agents of the State Monopoly Bureau struck a Taiwanese widow suspected of selling contraband cigarettes. An officer then fired into a crowd of angry bystanders, hitting one man, who died the next day. Soldiers fired upon demonstrators the next day, after which a radio station was seized by protesters and news of the revolt was broadcast to the entire island. As the uprising spread, the KMT-installed governor Chen Yi called for military reinforcements, and the uprising was violently put down by the National Revolutionary Army. Two years later, and for 38 years thereafter, the island would be placed under martial law in a period known as the "White Terror".

During the White Terror, the KMT persecuted perceived political dissidents, and the incident was considered too taboo to be discussed. President Lee Teng-hui became the first president to discuss the incident publicly on its anniversary in 1995. The event is now openly discussed, and its details have become the subject of government and academic investigation. February 28 is now an official public holiday called Peace Memorial Day, on which the president of Taiwan gathers with other officials to ring a commemorative bell in memory of the victims. Monuments and memorial parks to the victims of the February 28 incident have been erected in a number of Taiwanese cities. In particular, Taipei's former Taipei New Park was renamed 228 Peace Memorial Park, and the National 228 Memorial Museum was opened on February 28, 1997. The Kaohsiung Museum of History also has a permanent exhibit detailing the events of the incident in Kaohsiung. In 2019, the Transitional Justice Commission exonerated protesters who were convicted by the government in the aftermath.

The number of deaths from the incident and massacre was estimated to be between 18,000 and 28,000. Other estimates are much lower. While the majority of the casualties were Taiwanese at the hands of the military, historical records also document hundreds of Mainland civilians (Waishengren) were killed or injured by angry mobs. A government commission was set up under the administration of the pro-Taiwan independence president, Lee Teng-hui, to determine the facts. Using the civil registry set up during the Japanese administration, which was acknowledged by all as very efficient, they determined who was living at the time of the handover to the Chinese administration. The commission was given the power to award to the family of anyone who died in the period of the insurrection and the restoration of Nationalist government rule an amount of NT$6,000,000, about US$150,000. The families did not have to prove that the death was related to the above events. A total of 800 people came forward to get the awards for the people who died during the period.

== Background ==
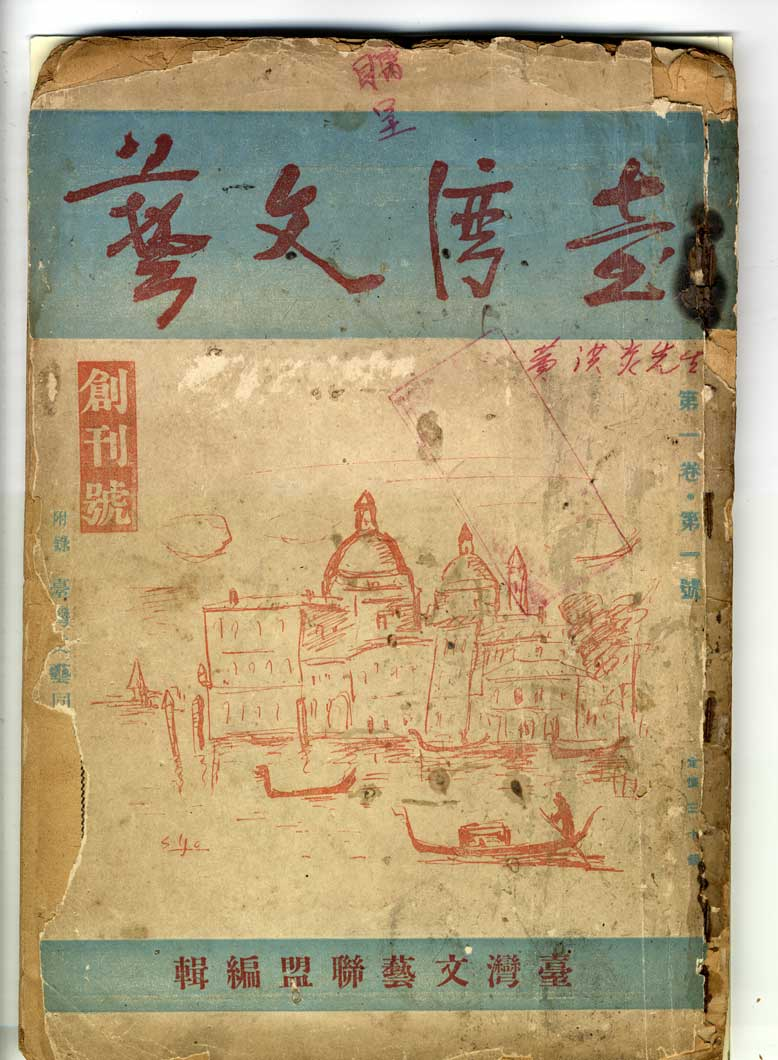
Cover of the first issue of Taiwan Literature and Art magazine (臺灣文藝; Táiwān wényì) printed in 1934, during Japanese rule

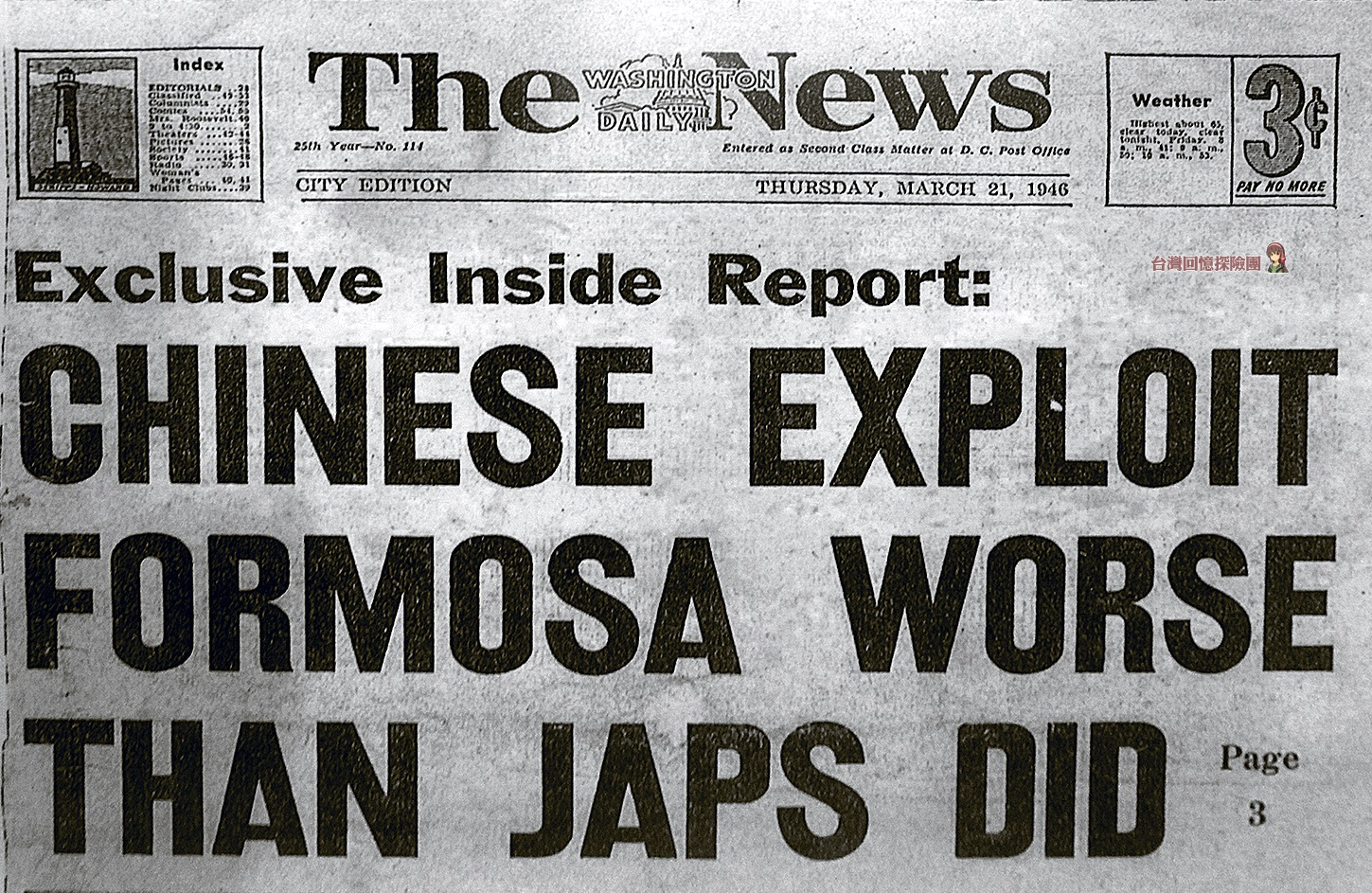
"Chinese Exploit Formosa Worse Than Japs Did", a news article from The Washington Daily News on March 21, 1946

During the 50 years of Japanese rule in Taiwan (1895–1945), Taiwan experienced economic development and an increased standard of living, serving as a supply base for the Japanese main islands. After World War II, Taiwan was placed under the administrative control of the Republic of China to provide stability until a permanent arrangement could be made. Chen Yi, the governor-general of Taiwan, arrived on October 24, 1945, and received the last Japanese governor, Ando Rikichi, who signed the receipt of Order No. 1 on the next day. Chen Yi then proclaimed the day as Retrocession Day to make Taiwan part of the Republic of China. The ROC government later issued a decree on the resumption of Chinese nationality for people on Taiwan, stating, "The people of Taiwan are people of our country. They lost their nationality because the island was invaded by an enemy. Now that the land has been recovered, the people who originally had the nationality of our country shall, effective on 25 December 1945, resume the nationality of our country." However, the governments of two of the allied powers, the United Kingdom and the United States, made it clear that they did not agree with Chinese government's unilateral proclamation about changing the territorial sovereignty over Taiwan and Taiwanese nationality before concluding a peace treaty with Japan.

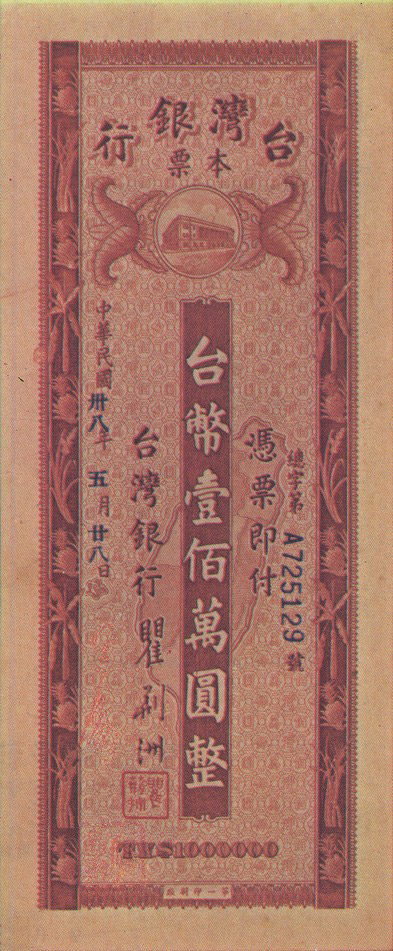
Severe inflation led the Bank of Taiwan to issue bearer's checks in denominations of 1 million Taiwan Dollars (TW$1,000,000) in 1949.

Taiwanese perceptions of Japanese rule were more positive than perceptions in other parts of East and Southeast Asia that came under Japanese imperialism. Despite this, the Kuomintang troops from Mainland China were initially welcomed by the Taiwanese. Their harsh conduct and the corrupt KMT administration quickly led to Taiwanese discontent during the immediate postwar period. As governor-general, Chen Yi took over and sustained the Japanese system of state monopolies in tobacco, sugar, camphor, tea, paper, chemicals, petroleum refining, mining, and cement, the same way the Nationalists treated people in other former Japanese-controlled areas (earning Chen Yi the nickname "robber" (劫收)). He confiscated some 500 Japanese-owned factories and mines, as well as the homes of former Japanese residents.

Economic mismanagement led to a large black market, runaway inflation, and food shortages. Many commodities were compulsorily bought cheaply by the KMT administration and shipped to mainland China to meet the Civil War shortages, where they were sold at a very high profit, furthering the general shortage of goods in Taiwan. The price of rice rose to 100 times its original value between the time the Nationalists took over and the spring of 1946, increasing to nearly four times the price in Shanghai. It inflated further to 400 times the original price by January 1947. Carpetbaggers from mainland China dominated nearly all industry, as well as political and judicial offices, displacing the Taiwanese who were formerly employed. Many of the ROC garrison troops were highly undisciplined, looting, stealing, and contributing to the overall breakdown of infrastructure and public services. Because the Taiwanese elites had met with some success with self-government under Japanese rule, they had expected the same system from the incoming ruling Chinese Nationalist Government. However, the Chinese Nationalists opted for a different route, aiming for the centralization of government powers and a reduction in local authority. The KMT's nation-building efforts followed this ideology because of unpleasant experiences with the diverging forces during the Warlord Era in 1916–1928 that had torn the government in China. Mainland Communists were even preparing to bring down the government like the Ili Rebellion. The different goals of the Nationalists and the Taiwanese, coupled with cultural and language misunderstandings, served to further inflame tensions on both sides.

== Uprising and crackdown ==
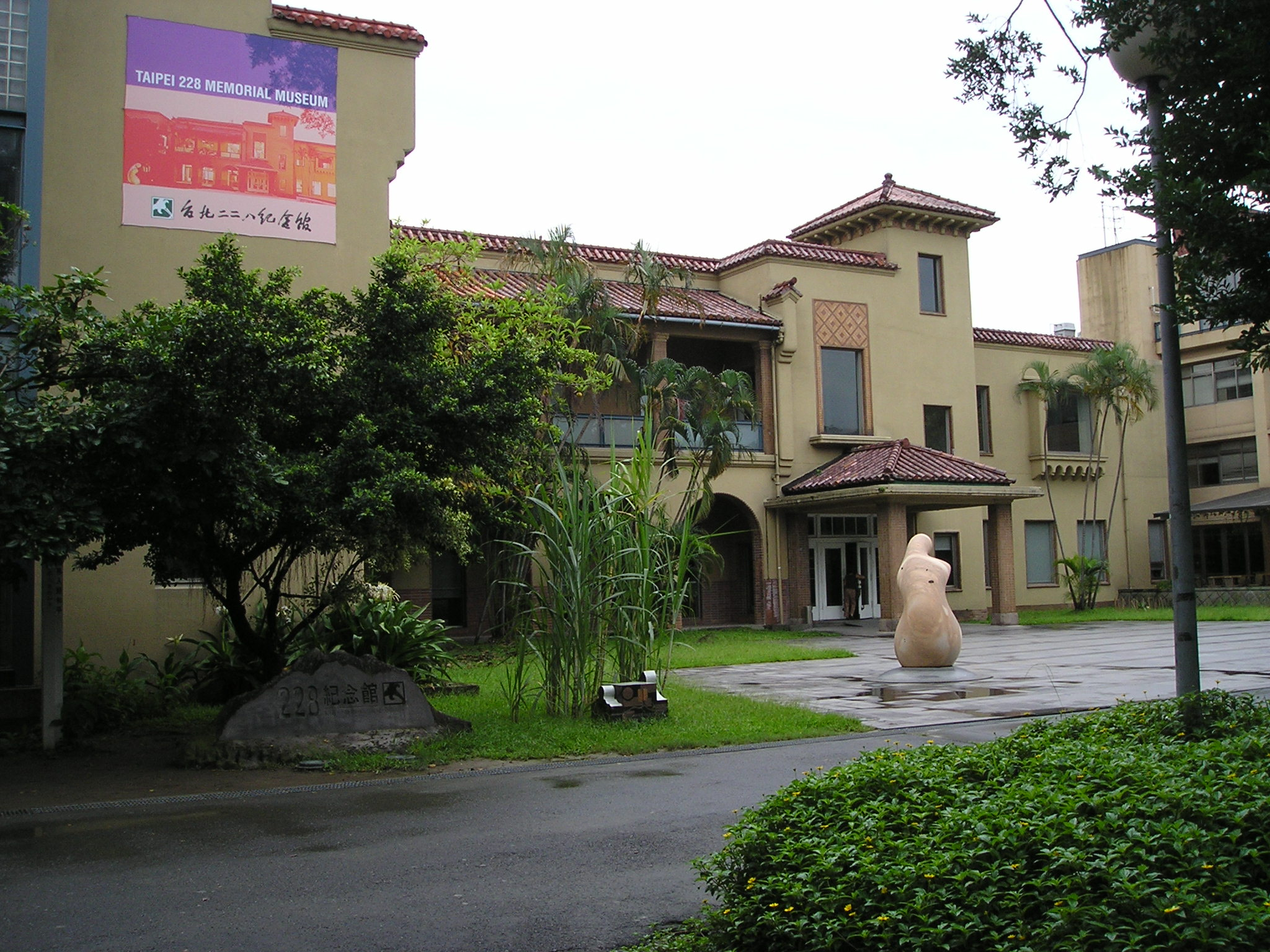
Today's 228 Memorial Museum in Taipei is housed in a broadcast station that played a role in the incident.

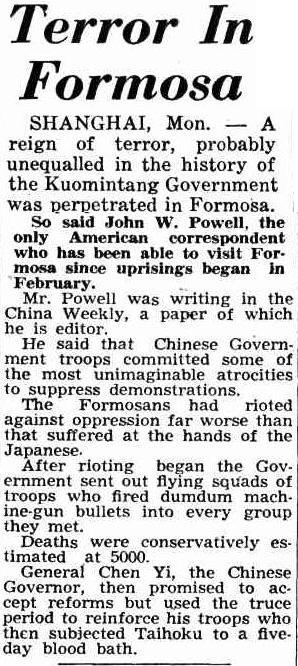
"Terror in Formosa", a news article from The Daily News of Perth, reported the status in March.

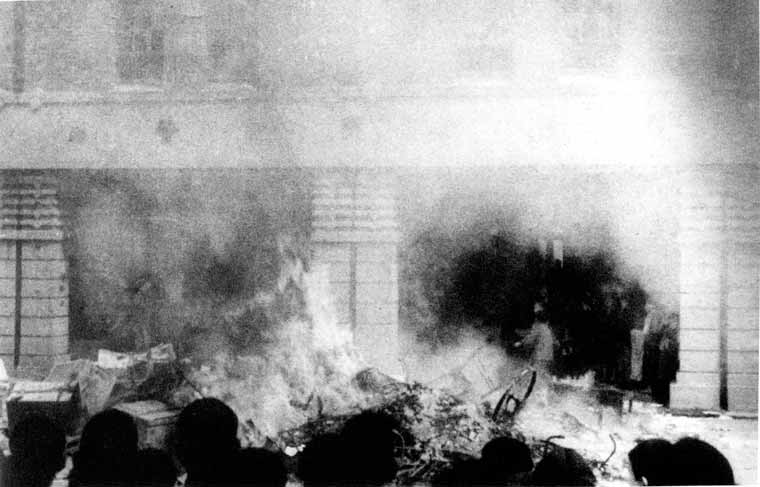
Angry residents storm the Yidingmu police station in Taipei on February 28, 1947

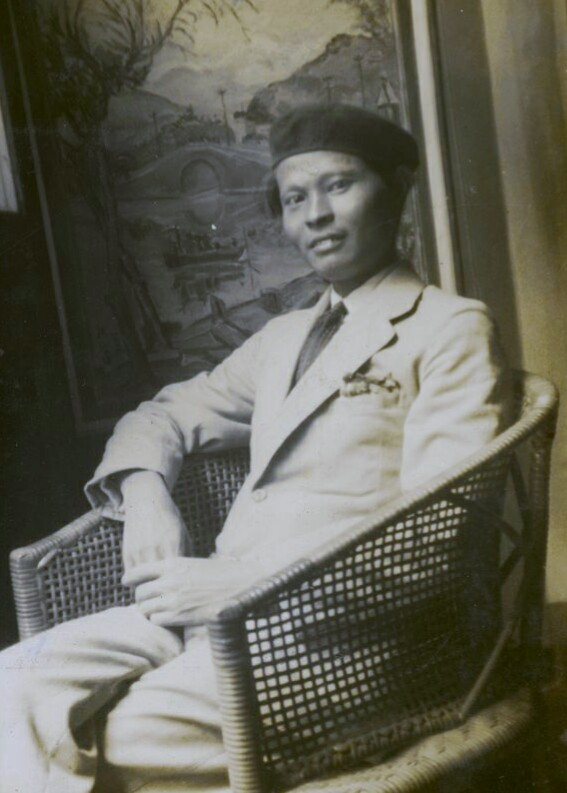
Painter and Professor Tan Teng-pho was killed in Chiayi

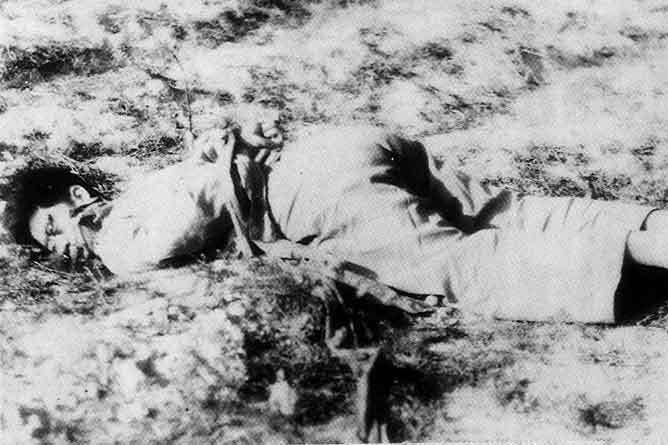
Those who were shot in the February 28 Incident.

On the evening of February 27, 1947, a Tobacco Monopoly Bureau enforcement team in Taipei went to the district of Taiheichō (太平町), Twatutia (Dadaocheng in Mandarin), where they confiscated contraband cigarettes from a 40-year-old widow named Lin Jiang-mai (林江邁) at the Tianma Tea House. When she demanded their return, one of the men struck her in the head with the butt of his gun, prompting the surrounding Taiwanese crowd to challenge the Tobacco Monopoly agents. As they fled, one agent shot his gun into the crowd, hitting a bystander who died the next day. The crowd, which had already been harbouring feelings of frustration from unemployment, inflation, and corruption towards the Nationalist government, reached its breaking point. The crowd protested to both the police and the gendarmes but was mostly ignored.

Protesters gathered the next morning around Taipei, calling for the arrest and trial of the agents involved in the previous day's shooting, and eventually made their way to the Governor General's Office, where security forces tried to disperse the crowd. Soldiers opened fire into the crowd, killing at least three people. On March 4, the Taiwanese took over the administration of the town and military bases and forced their way into a local radio station to broadcast news of the incident and call for people to revolt, causing uprisings to erupt throughout the island. By evening, martial law had been declared, and curfews were enforced by the arrest or shooting of anyone who violated the curfew.

For several weeks after the February 28 incident, Taiwanese civilians controlled much of Taiwan. The initial riots were spontaneous and sometimes violent, with mainland Chinese receiving beatings from and being killed by Taiwanese. Over 1,000 mainlanders were killed. Within a few days, the Taiwanese were generally coordinated and organized, and public order in Taiwanese-held areas was upheld by volunteer civilians organised by students and unemployed former Japanese army soldiers. Local leaders formed settlement committees (or resolution committees), which presented the government with a list of 32 demands for reform of the provincial administration. They demanded, among other things, greater autonomy, free elections, the surrender of the ROC Army to the Settlement Committee, and an end to government corruption. Motivations among the various Taiwanese groups varied; some demanded greater autonomy within the ROC, while others wanted UN trusteeship or full independence. The Taiwanese also demanded representation in the forthcoming peace treaty negotiations with Japan, hoping to secure a plebiscite to determine the island's political future.

Outside of Taipei, there were examples of the formation of local militias, such as the Communist-inspired 27 Brigade near Taichung. In Chiayi, the mayor's residence was set on fire, and local militias fought with the military police.

The Nationalist Government, under governor Chen Yi, stalled for time while it waited for reinforcements from Fujian. Upon their arrival on March 8, the ROC troops launched a crackdown. The New York Times reported, "An American who had just arrived in China from Taipei said that troops from the mainland China arrived there on March 7 and indulged in three days of indiscriminate killing and arrest. For a time, everyone seen on the streets was fired upon, homes were broken into, and occupants were arrested. In the lower income sections the streets were said to have been littered with dead.

By the end of March, Chen Yi had ordered the imprisonment or execution of the leading Taiwanese organizers he could identify. His troops reportedly executed, according to a Taiwanese delegation in Nanjing, maybe between 3,000 to 4,000 people throughout the island, though the exact number is still undetermined. Detailed records kept by the KMT have been reported as missing. Some of the killings were random, while others were systematic. Taiwanese political leaders were among those targeted, and many of the Taiwanese who had formed self-governing groups during the reign of the Japanese were also victims of the February 28 incident. A disproportionate number of the victims had been discharged from the Imperial Japanese Army and came back unemployed. They were involved in the riots and looting and beat up recent immigrants from China. They presented the most fear, as they looked no different from Japanese soldiers from the mainland.

Some political organisations that participated in the uprising, for example the Taiwan Democratic Self-Government League, were declared "communist". Many of their members were arrested and executed.

By late March 1947, the central executive committee of the KMT had recommended that Chen Yi be dismissed as governor-general over the "merciless brutality" he had shown in suppressing the rebellion. In June 1948, he was appointed provincial chairman of Zhejiang province. In January 1949, he attempted to defect to the Chinese Communist Party, but Chiang Kai-shek immediately relieved Chen of his duties. Chen Yi was escorted to Taiwan and later imprisoned in Keelung. In May 1950, a Taiwan military court sentenced Chen Yi to death for espionage. On June 18, he was executed at Machangding, Taipei.

== Death toll ==
No accurate death toll exists, but the most frequently cited figures range between 8,000–28,000.

In the immediate aftermath of the events, in addition to the Nanjing-based delegation, which cited 3,000–4,000, George Kerr cited a figure of 10,000 as being provided by various externally-based groups, a figure he cited in Formosa Betrayed, the first major book covering the incident in English which played a significant role in bringing it to light.

A commonly cited range of 18,000–28,000 is based on an estimate made by a commission established in 1992 by then Premier Hau Pei-tsun, whose final report was adopted in 2007 by Premier Su Tseng-chang as the official account of the incident.

The 18,000–28,000 range has been challenged by several individuals, most prominently by Hau Pei-tsun, who in a letter published in the Chinese-language United Daily News in February 2012, questioned whether "over 10,000 were killed" in the 228 Incident. Hau based his critique on the number of victims and their descendants who were claiming compensation for damages. Only around 1,000 people had put in claims for compensation as victims of the incident. However, others have contended that the veil of secrecy under the martial law period and taboo of discussing the matter had contributed to this low number, particularly as many descendants of victims may have been unaware that their relatives had perished.

Another critique of the common figure came from Marvin C. H. Ho, the president of the Taipei Language Institute and a member of the commission that issued the report. Mr. Ho stated that among his colleagues writing the report, very few supported the higher figure of 28,000. However, at the same time, he critiqued the report for only limiting itself to events in 1947. Fellow commission member Lai Tse-han, a history professor who was in charge of drafting the report, suggested that the report was shifting some blame away from the Chiang family by not covering extensive violations of human rights during the period where they had undeniable knowledge and complicity in the events, namely the 1950s and 1960s. Professor Lai stated that "A lot of people here don't know about the repression in the 50's and 60's... More people were killed at that time than during 2-28. Police just knocked on the door at midnight, and then the people inside just disappeared." This viewpoint is somewhat similar to that of Kerr, who cited a figure of 10,000, but stated that between 1947 and 1965, when Formosa Betrayed was published, that " If we add to this the thousands who have been seized and done away with since March, 1947, on the pretext that they were involved in the affair, the number may reach the 20,000 figure often given by Formosan writers."

== Legacy ==
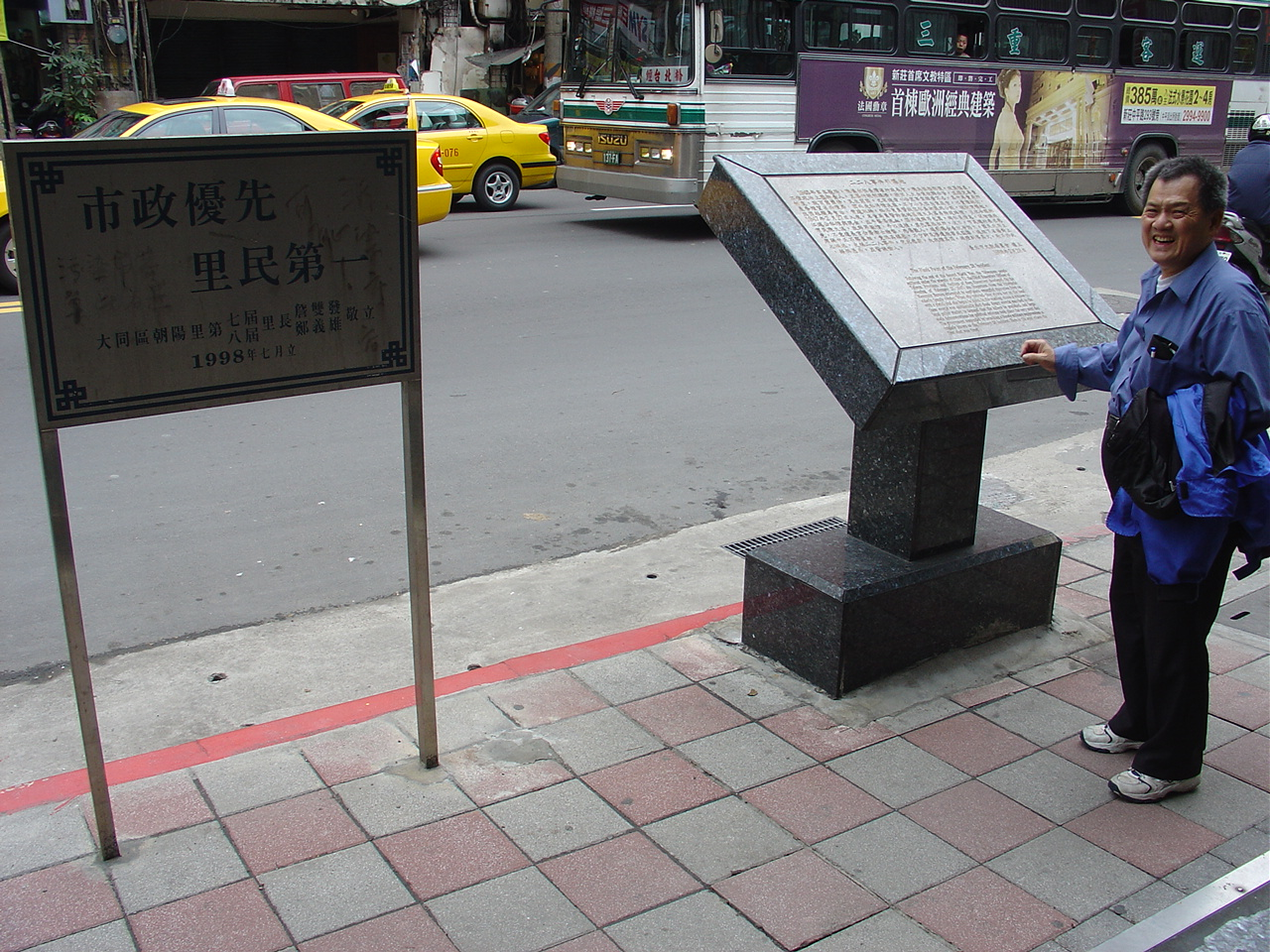
Today, a memorial plaque marks the exact location where the first shot was fired

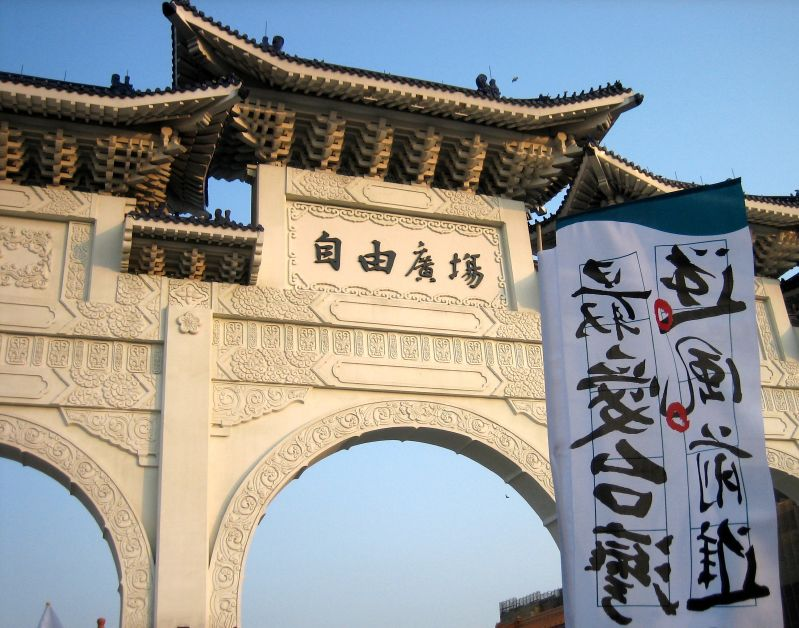
228 Memorial Day, 2008 in Liberty Square

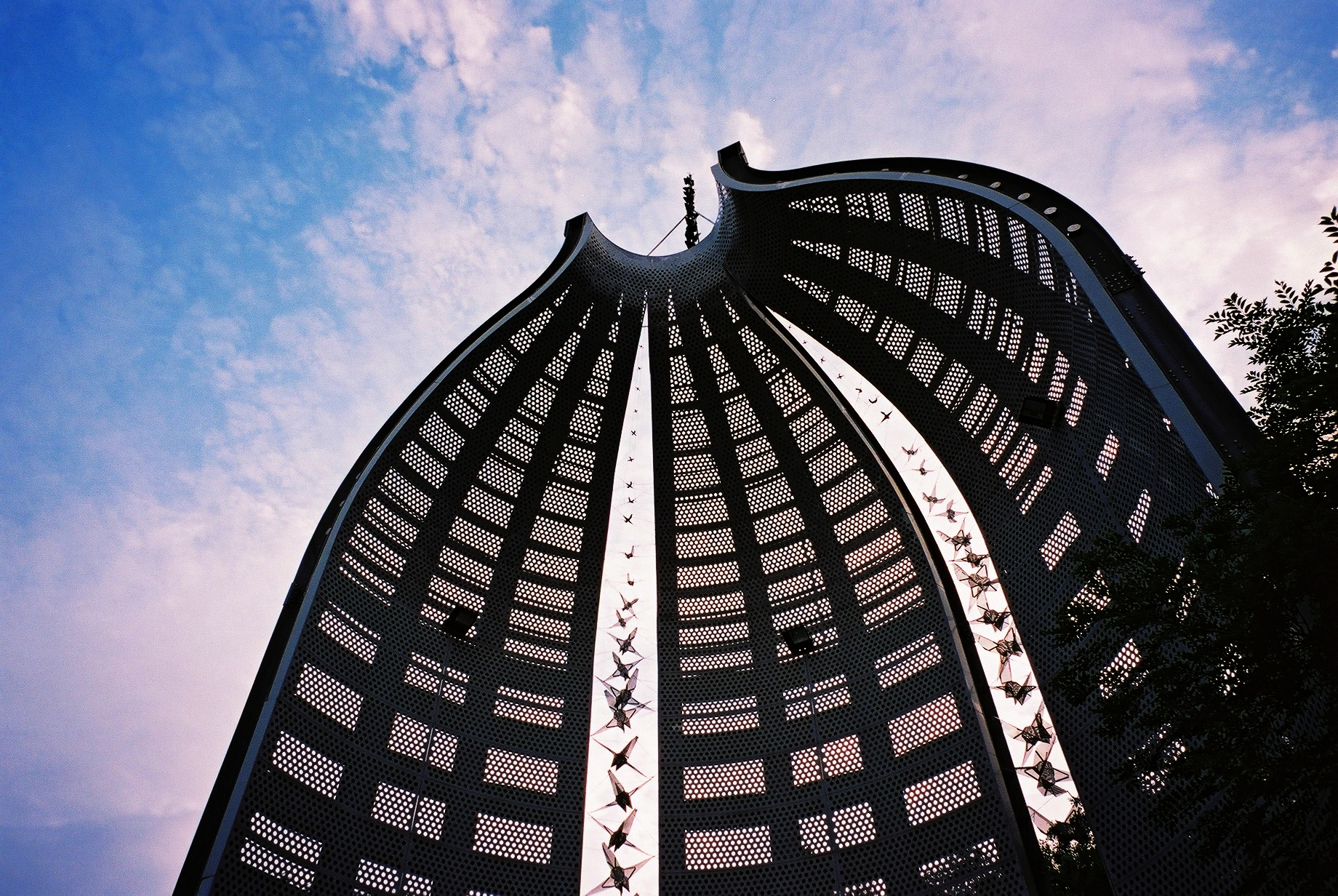
228 Memorial Park in Taichung

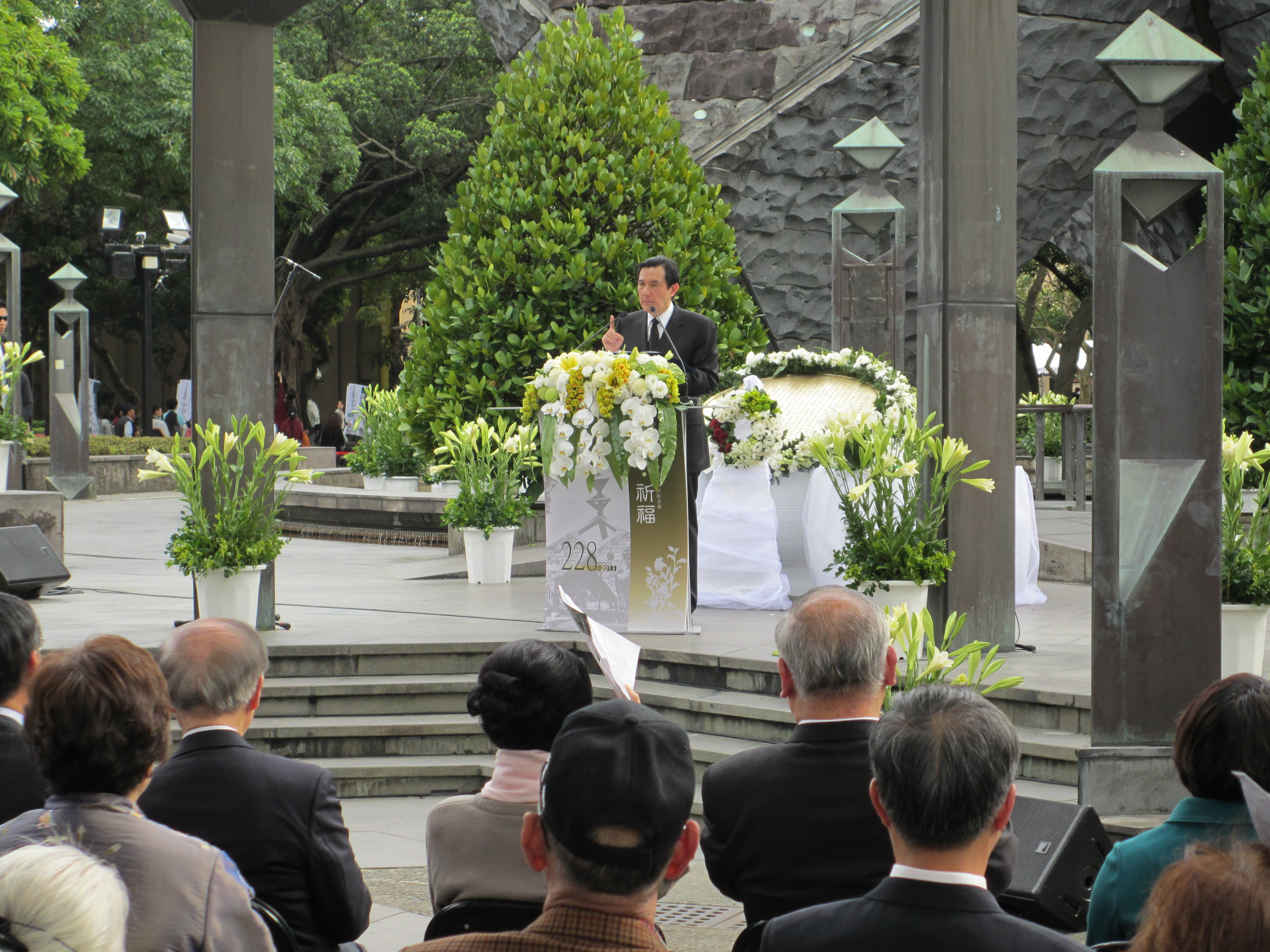
President Ma Ying-jeou addresses the families of victims of the February 28 incident

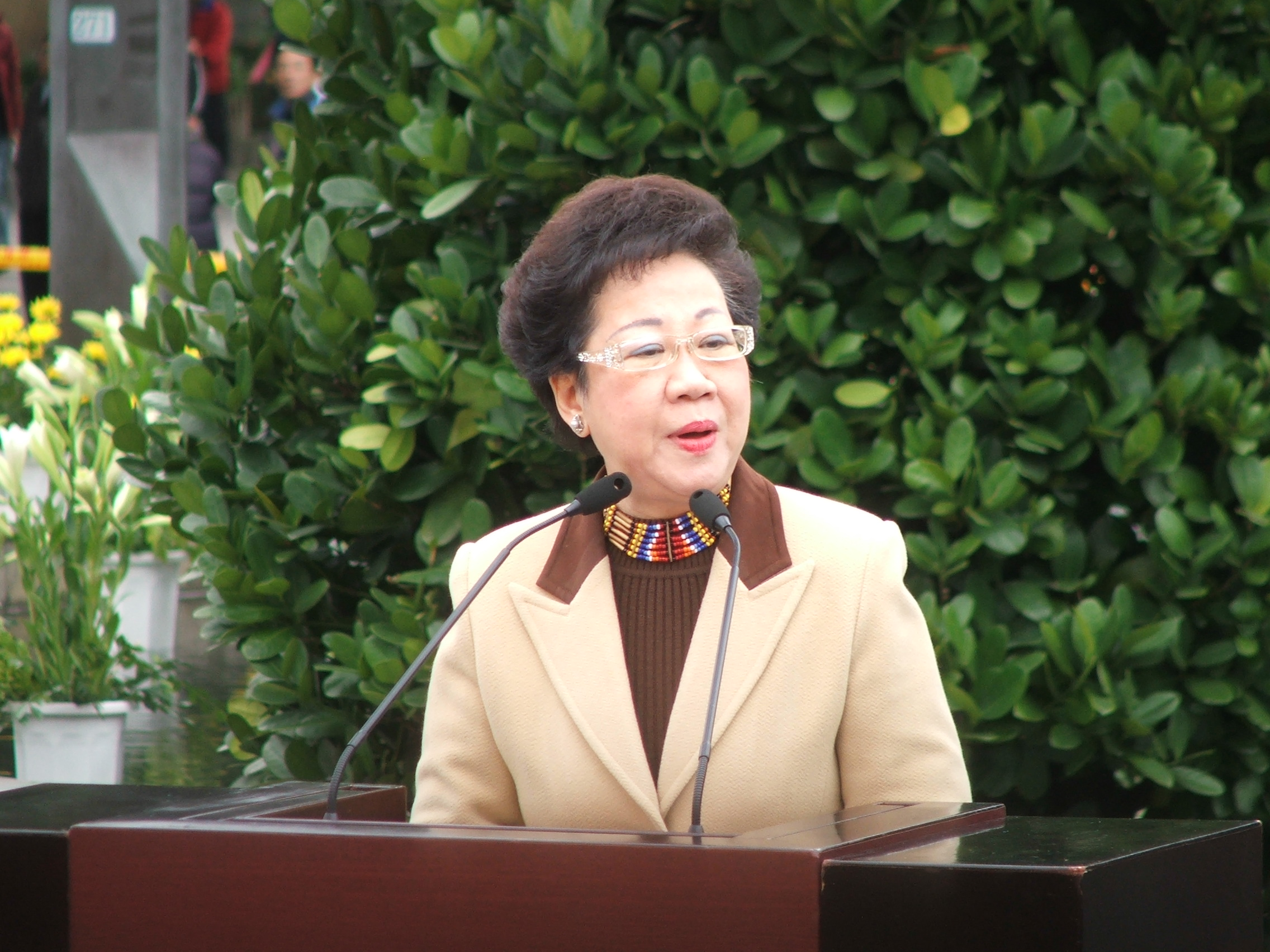
Vice President Annette Lu, once a political prisoner, speaking at the 228 Memorial in 2008.

During the February 28 incident, Taiwanese leaders established Resolution Committees in various cities (with a central committee in Taipei) and demanded greater political autonomy. Negotiations with the ROC ended when troops arrived in early March. The subsequent feelings of betrayal felt towards the government and China are widely believed to have catalysed today's Taiwan independence movement post-democratization. The initial February 28 purge was followed two years later by 38 years of martial law, commonly referred to as the White Terror, which lasted until the end of 1987, during which over 100,000 people were imprisoned for political reasons of which over 1,000 were executed. During this time, discussion of the incident was taboo.

In the 1970s, the 228 Justice and Peace Movement was initiated by several citizen groups to ask for a reversal of this policy and in 1992, the Executive Yuan promulgated the "February 28 Incident Research Report". Then-president and KMT chairman Lee Teng-hui, who had participated in the incident and was arrested as an instigator and a Communist sympathizer, made a formal apology on behalf of the government in 1995 and declared February 28 a day to commemorate the victims. Among other memorials erected, Taipei New Park was renamed 228 Memorial Park.

In 1990, the ROC Executive Yuan set up a task force to investigate the February 28 incident. The "Report of the 228 Incident" (二二八事件研究報告) was published in 1992, and a memorial was set up in 1995 at the 228 Peace Park in Taipei. In October 1995, the state-funded Memorial Foundation of 228 (二二八事件紀念基金會) was established to distribute compensation again and award rehabilitation certificates to victims of the February 28 incident in order to restore their reputation. Family members of dead and missing victims are eligible for NT$6 million (approximately US$190,077). The foundation reviewed 2,885 applications, most of which were accepted. Of these, 686 involved deaths, 181 involved missing persons, and 1,459 involved imprisonment. Many descendants of victims remain unaware that their family members were victims, while many of the families of victims from mainland China did not know the details of their relatives' mistreatment during the riot. Those who have received compensation twice are still demanding trials of the still-living soldiers and officials who were responsible for the jail terms and deaths of their loved ones. On the other hand, some survivors thought the arrest and questioning had more to do with looting and riot participation as many unemployed citizens had just been discharged from the Japanese Imperial Army from overseas.

On February 28, 2004, thousands of Taiwanese participated in the 228 Hand-in-Hand Rally. They formed a 500-kilometer (310 mi) long human chain from Taiwan's northernmost city to its southern tip to commemorate the incident, call for peace, and protest the People's Republic of China's deployment of missiles aimed at Taiwan along the coast of the Taiwan Strait.

In 2006, the Research Report on Responsibility for the 228 Massacre (二二八事件責任歸屬研究報告) was released after several years of research. The 2006 report was not intended to overlap with the prior (1992) 228 Massacre Research Report commissioned by the Executive Yuan. Chiang Kai-shek is specifically named as having the largest responsibility in the 2006 report.

We think that Chiang Kai-Shek, president of the Nationalist government, should bear the biggest responsibility for the 228 Massacre. Reasons being that he not only was oblivious to warning cautioned by the Control Yuan prior to the Massacre, he was also partial to Chen Yi afterward. None of the provincial military and political officials in Taiwan were punished because of the Massacre. Furthermore, he deployed forces right after the Massacre, as written in a letter by Chen Yi to Chiang Kai-Shek dated March 13: "If not for Your Excellency to mobilize troop[s] rapidly, one could not imagine how far this massacre will lead to." Chiang Kai-Shek, despite all information he gathered from the party, government, army, intelligence, and representative of Taiwanese groups, still chose to send troops right away; he summoned commander of the 21st division Liu Yu-Cing.

The Chinese Communist Party (CCP) on mainland China framed the February 28 incident in Taiwan as a "patriotic, anti-imperialist struggle led by Chinese patriots" in Taiwan against the KMT. The CCP's narrative aim to strip away the core grievances that sparked the incident—the cultural and ethnic clashes between native Taiwanese and the mainlanders who arrived after World War II and sought to de-legitimize the Taiwanese general consensus that the incident was the foundational spark that contributed to modern Taiwanese identity and fueled the desire for self-determination and autonomy. Beijing asserts that the protesters were not demanding local self-governance or separate identity, but were instead displaying "Chinese patriotism" and a desire to be part of a unified China.

=== Art ===
A number of artists in Taiwan have addressed the subject of the February 28 incident since the taboo was lifted on the subject in the early 1990s. The incident has been the subject of music by Fan-Long Ko and Tyzen Hsiao and a number of literary works.

=== Film ===
Hou Hsiao-hsien's A City of Sadness, the first movie that addressed the events, won the Golden Lion at the 1989 Venice Film Festival. The 2009 thriller Formosa Betrayed also relates the incident as part of the motivation behind Taiwan independence activist characters. The 2025 film A Foggy Tale depicts the quest of a young girl from outside Chiayi who travels alone to Taipei to retrieve the body of her brother after he was executed by the Kuomintang during the White Terror period.

=== Literature ===
Jennifer Chow's 2013 novel The 228 Legacy revealed the emotional ramifications for those who lived through the events yet suppressed their knowledge out of fear. It focused on how there was such an impact that it permeated throughout multiple generations within the same family. Shawna Yang Ryan's 2016 novel Green Island tells the story of the incident as it affects three generations of a Taiwanese family, while Julie Wu's novel The Third Son (2013) describes the event and its aftermath from the viewpoint of a Taiwanese boy. Mud River by Chen Yeh (陳燁) is partly set during the February 28 incident.

=== Music ===
The Taiwanese metal band Chthonic's album Mirror of Retribution makes several lyrical references to the February 28 incident.

== See also ==
- Formosa Betrayed (1965 book)
- History of Taiwan
- History of the Republic of China
- The dogs go and the pigs come
- List of massacres in Taiwan
- List of massacres in China
- The First 228 Peace Memorial Monument
- 228 Hand-in-Hand Rally (in 2004)
- Zhongli incident
- Political status of Taiwan
- White Terror (Taiwan)
- Universal Declaration of Human Rights (1948)
- KMT retreat to Taiwan in 1949
- Jeju uprising in South Korea
- 1989 Tiananmen Square protests and massacre
- 2019–2020 Hong Kong protests

== Bibliography ==
- Kerr, George H.; Stuart, John Leighton (April 21, 1947). Memorandum on the Situation in Taiwan (Report). American Embassy, Nanking, China. Telegram No. 689.. Reprinted in: Acheson, Dean (August 1949). United States relations with China, with special reference to the period 1944–1949, based on the files of the Department of State. Far Eastern Series. Compiled from Department of State records. Washington: U.S. Govt. Print. Off. pp. 923–938. hdl:2027/umn.31951d01115459w. OCLC 664471448.
- Kerr, George H. (1965). Formosa Betrayed. Boston: Houghton Mifflin. OL 5948105M.
- Lai, Tse-han; Myers, Ramon Hawley; Wei, Wou (1991). A Tragic Beginning: The Taiwan Uprising of February 28, 1947. Palo Alto: Stanford University Press. ISBN 9780804718295.
- Shackleton, Allan J. (1998) [1948]. Formosa Calling: An Eyewitness Account of Conditions in Taiwan during the February 28th, 1947 Incident. Upland, California: Taiwan Publishing Company. OCLC 419279752. Archived from the original on October 8, 2014.
- Wakabayashi, Masahiro (2003). "4: Overcoming the Difficult Past; Rectification of the 2–28 Incident and the Politics of Reconciliation in Taiwan". In Funabashi, Yōichi (ed.). Reconciliation in the Asia-Pacific. Washington, D.C.: United States Institute of Peace Press. pp. 91–109. ISBN 9781929223473. OCLC 51755853.
