= National University of Tainan =

Public university in Tainan, Taiwan

Coordinates: 22°59′02″N 120°12′26″E

- 國立臺南大學
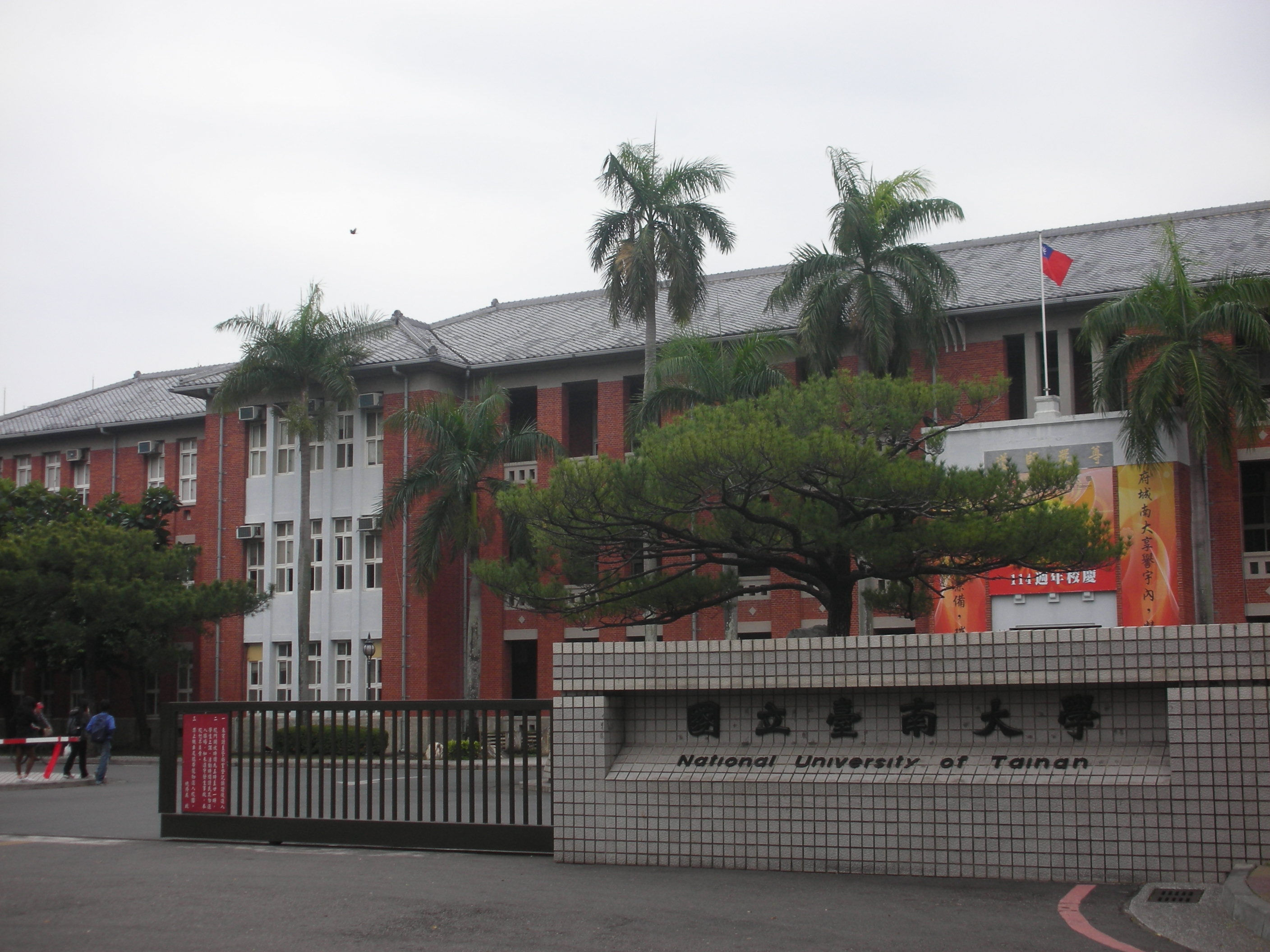
- Motto: 仁智誠正、勤奮篤實 (Chinese)
- Motto in English: Compassion, Intelligence, Sincerity, Justice
- Type: Public (National)
- Established: June 1899 (as Tainan Normal School); August 2004 (as NUTN)
- President: Huang Tzung-hsien (黃宗顯)
- Academic staff: 234 (2019)
- Undergraduates: 3,938 (2019)
- Postgraduates: 1,729 (2019)
- Location: Main Campus: 33, Sec. 2, Shu-Lin St., Tainan(70005), Rongyu Campus: 67, Rong-Yu., Tainan(70167), Taiwan
- Campus: Urban, 29.281988 acres (0.1185 km^{2}), Secondary 296.50175 acres (1.1999 km^{2})
- Nickname: 南大 (Chinese)、NUTN
- Website: eng.nutn.edu.tw/

National University of Tainan
- Traditional Chinese: 國立臺南大學
- Simplified Chinese: 国立台南大学
Transcriptions
Standard Mandarin
- Hanyu Pinyin: Guólì Táinán Dàxué

The National University of Tainan (NUTN; Chinese: 國立臺南大學; pinyin: Guólì Táinán Dàxué) is a university in West Central District, Tainan, Taiwan.

NUTN offers a wide range of undergraduate and graduate programs across six colleges: the College of Education, the College of Humanities, the College of Management, the College of Science and Engineering, the College of Arts, and the College of Environmental Sciences and Ecology.

The university has several research institutes and centers, including the Center for Teacher Education and Professional Development, the Center for International Studies, and the Center for Sustainable Development.

== History ==
NUTN was founded during the Japanese rule as Tainan Normal School in June 1899. In January 1946, after handover to the Republic of China, the school was renamed Taiwan Provincial Tainan Normal School. In August 1962, the school was promoted to Taiwan Provincial Tainan Junior Teachers' College. The college was then promoted to Taiwan Provincial Tainan Teachers' College in July 1987. In July 1991, it was then again promoted as National Tainan Teachers' College. In August 2004, the college was promoted and renamed National University of Tainan.

== Academics ==
NUTN has six colleges: Education, Humanities, Science and Engineering, Environmental Sciences and Ecology, Arts and Management.

== Ranking ==
National University of Tainan rankings

Regional – Overall
- QS Asia: 801-850 (2025)

In 2025 QS World University Ranking, NUTN was ranked 801-850th in Asia.

== Museums ==
- Bo Yang Museum
- Shiang Yu Museum

== Transportation ==
The university is accessible within walking distance from the Tainan Station of Taiwan Railway.

== Notable alumni ==
- Tu Cheng-sheng, Minister of Education (2004–2008)

== See also ==
- Education in Taiwan
- List of universities in Taiwan
