= Chen Yi (Kuomintang) =

Chinese politician (1883–1950)

- 陳儀
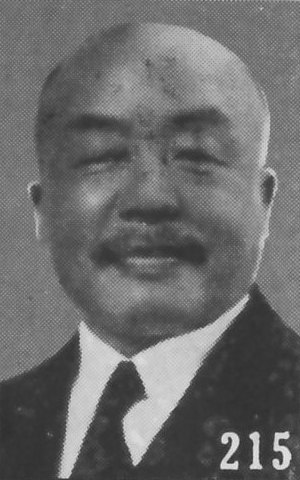
- Chen Yi as pictured in The Most Recent Biographies of Chinese Dignitaries

Governor of Zhejiang
- In office 22 June 1948 – 21 February 1949
- Preceded by: Shen Honglie
- Succeeded by: Zhou Yan

Chief Executive of Taiwan Province
- In office 29 August 1945 – 24 April 1947
- Preceded by: Rikichi Andō (as Governor-General of Taiwan)
- Succeeded by: Wei Tao-ming (as Chairperson of Taiwan Provincial Government)

Governor of Fujian
- In office 12 January 1934 – 28 August 1941
- Preceded by: Jiang Guangnai
- Succeeded by: Liu Jianxu

Personal details
- Born: 3 May 1883 Shaoxing, Zhejiang, China
- Died: 18 June 1950 (aged 67) Machangding, Hsintien, Taiwan
- Cause of death: Execution by shooting
- Resting place: Wugu, New Taipei
- Party: Kuomintang
- Education: Qiushi Academy

Military service
- Allegiance: Republic of China
- Years of service: 1902–1949
- Rank: General
- Commands: 19th Route Army
- Battles/wars: Xinhai Revolution; Northern Expedition; Chinese Civil War; Second Sino-Japanese War

Chen Yi (Chinese: 陳儀; pinyin: Chén Yí; courtesy names Gongxia (公俠) and later Gongqia (公洽), sobriquet Tuisu (退素); May 3, 1883 – June 18, 1950) was a Chinese military officer and politician who served as the chief executive and garrison commander of Taiwan Province after the Empire of Japan surrendered to the Republic of China. He acted on behalf of the Allied Powers to accept the Japanese Instrument of Surrender in Taipei Zhongshan Hall on October 25, 1945. He is considered to have mismanaged the tension between the Taiwanese and Mainland Chinese which resulted in the February 28 Incident in 1947, resulting in the deaths of 18,000 to 28,000 people, and was dismissed. In June 1948, he was appointed Chairman of Zhejiang Province, but was dismissed and arrested when his plan to surrender to the Chinese Communist Party was discovered. He was sentenced to death and executed by shooting in Taipei in 1950.

== Early life and education ==
Chen was born in Shaoxing, Zhejiang. After studying at Qiushi Academy (now Zhejiang University), in 1902 he went to a military academy in Japan for seven years. Chen Yi already had a wife back in China named Shen Hui (沈蕙) from Dongpu (東浦) in Shaoxing, but Chen Yi also married a Japanese woman in 1916 as his second wife, a daughter of a Japanese military instructor, her name was Yoshiko Furuzuki (古月好子) who later changed her name to Chen Yuefang (陳月芳) when she moved to China with Chen Yi. He joined Guangfuhui while in Japan. He returned to Japan in 1917 to study in a military university for three years, then resided in Shanghai. He is said to have been a "Japanophile."

He was the first senator (總參議) and governor of Zhejiang (since October 1925). He was a lieutenant of warlord Sun Chuanfang, but in 1927 he defected to Chiang Kai-shek's army. Chen was also the commander of the 19th Route Army of the National Revolutionary Army (國民革命軍第十九路軍軍長). After 1927, he worked in the Military Affairs Department (軍政部), as director of the Shanghai Arsenal, viceminister of war and since 1934 as chairman of the Fujian province, and Secretary-General of the Executive Yuan.

== Chen and Fujian ==
Chen served as governor of Fujian province for eight years, beginning in 1934. His experience in Fujian, the province immediately across the Taiwan Strait and the source of a larger percentage of Taiwan's population, was clearly a factor in Chen's selection to take control of Taiwan at the end of the war.

As a chairman of the Fujian province, he took the task of destroying the 19th Route Army during the Fujian Incident. During his government, Fujian province established close links with Japan, even after the outbreak of the Second Sino-Japanese War.

During his tenure in Fujian, Chen got a taste of the complexity of ethnic and social ties among people from Fujian natives and the diaspora in Southeast Asia. He ran afoul of Fujian-born community leader Tan Kah Kee, a prominent and influential businessman and philanthropist based in Singapore, a British colony whose ethnic Chinese community were predominantly Hokkien-speaking. As a result of the conflict, Chen had to spend considerable effort and political capital fending off accusations of maladministration made against him by the influential Tan.

As a governor, he promoted the so-called "Necessary State Socialism" as an economic policy, which was based on the creation of state-run monopolies.

== Chen and Taiwan ==
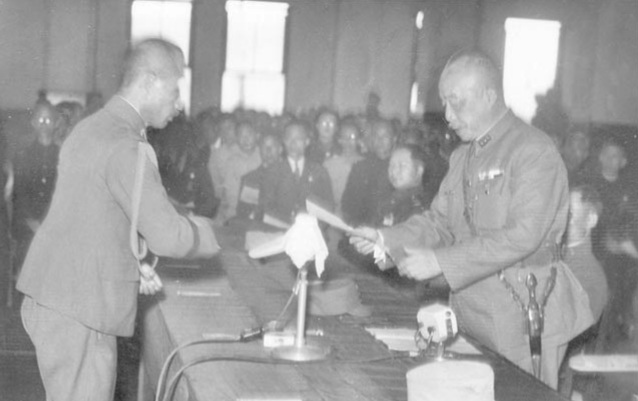
Chen (right) accepting the receipt of Order No. 1 signed by Rikichi Andō (left), the last Japanese Governor-General of Taiwan, in Taipei City Hall.

In 1935, Chen was sent to Taiwan by Chiang Kai-shek to attend "Exposition to Commemorate the 40th Anniversary of the Beginning of Administration in Taiwan," an exposition which served as a report on the achievements of Taiwan's modernization process under Japanese rule. During his stay in Taiwan, he praised the modern public facilities and the strong economic development. Chen publicly expressed his admiration with jealousy about the advanced life quality Taiwanese people enjoyed compared with the Chinese mainlanders who suffered from prolonged war incurred destruction and lack of further modernization. After he went back to Fujian, he filed a report to Chiang Kai-shek about his visit. With his experience in Japan and Taiwan, Chen had become the first candidate as the Taiwan governor in Chiang's mind after Japan relinquished the sovereignty of Taiwan.

Under the authorization of Douglas MacArthur's General Order No. 1, Chen Yi was escorted by George Kerr to Taiwan to accept Japan government's surrender as the Chinese delegate. On October 25, 1945, joined by delegates from the Allied Powers, Chen signed a surrender instrument with General Ando Rikichi, governor-general of Taiwan, in Taipei City Hall (current Zhongshan Hall). Chen Yi proclaimed that day to be the Taiwan Retrocession Day which was regarded as legally controversial as Japan had not yet ceded Taiwan in any treaty until 1952. Native Taiwanese, who were generally anti-Communist and supportive of the KMT, cheered the retrocession, believing their exports could now be directed to help China rather than Japan. The local elites established "Preparatory Committees to Welcome the National Government", to help distribute promotional materials on behalf of the Chinese Nationalists.

=== Praise and criticism ===
Chen did receive some praise for his dedication to work, his frugality, and incorruptibility. He was, however, criticized for his support for his more corrupt subordinates, and his stubborn lack of flexibility in some policies. Despite fluency in Japanese, he refused to use the language to interact with local Taiwanese elites, many of whom could not speak Mandarin, believing that the island must abandon the colonial language in favor of the new national tongue. This inability to communicate easily with his subjects and the fact he made surprisingly little effort to leave his official offices and interact with the Taiwanese society he ruled over made it difficult for him to detect the growing unrest on the island after the first year of postwar rule.

Perhaps no single province in China involved so little military expenditure as that needed for Formosa before March 1, 1947. It may now well become one of the most costly, if the economic losses in production and hampered transportation are added to outright military costs.

— John Leighton Stuart, Memorandum on the Situation in Taiwan, to Generalissimo Chiang (1947)

Chen was later removed from the position of Taiwan governor general for his mishandling of the administration of Taiwan. Chen's policies led to the 228 Incident of 1947, and during the brutal suppression of local protests that erupted after the 228 Incident, an estimated 5,000 to 28,000 local and non-local Taiwanese civilians were killed.

=== Chen and the 2/28 Incident ===
In the early years of KMT Chinese rule of Taiwan, rampant corruption in the new administration headed by Chen caused high unemployment rates, widespread disease, and severe inflation, which in turn led to widespread local discontent. In addition, new policies announced in early 1947 further enraged locals: direct elections would be delayed until late 1949, despite the adoption of the Chinese Constitution in 1947; land and properties seized by the Japanese fifty years earlier would only be available to wealthy individuals who were connected to the government rather than those families whose lands had been seized; and monopolistic control would be concentrated among a few government officials. Allegations of carpet bagging by new immigrants from the mainland and a breakdown in social and governmental services also served to increase tensions. As the Shanghai newspaper Wenhui Bao remarked, Chen ran everything "from the hotel to the night-soil business." The Taiwanese felt like colonial stepchildren rather than long-lost sons of Han.

Anti-KMT riots flared following the 228 Incident, which was sparked by the beating death of a widow on February 27, 1947. Agents from the Taiwan Monopoly Bureau beat a widow to death during her arrest for selling smuggled cigarettes in violation of the state monopoly of tobacco. Enraged onlookers forced the agents to flee; as they escaped, they shot indiscriminately into the crowd, killing one. A peaceful protest march occurred on February 28, demanding justice for the widow's killers; after marching to the headquarters of the Monopoly Bureau, they moved on to the Governor-General's office, where four were shot and killed without warning by machine guns. The resulting riots forced the Governor-General to barricade government offices in Taipei, declaring martial law on February 28. Riots spread to the rest of Taiwan over the next few days; in Taipei, civic leaders formed the "Committee to Settle the February 28th Incident" to meet with the Governor-General, urgently requesting that martial law be lifted to reduce the consequences of protests. Chen agreed to lift martial law starting on March 2.

Chen announced his love for the native Taiwanese in a radio address at midnight to mark the beginning of March 2, proposing to meet with the Committee by March 10; the Committee would also be responsible for drafting suggestions to reform his administration. During the address, troops and police continued to shoot unarmed civilians in several incidents witnessed by American consulate officials, killing approximately thirty. In the wake of the radio address, Chen promised to withdraw government forces by the evening of March 3, and a "Loyal Service Corps", consisting mainly of students under the authority of the Committee, patrolled the streets to keep order. The committee's recommendations, submitted on March 7, were intended to upgrade the status of Taiwan from a colony to a province of China and give the native Taiwanese a greater role in their own governance, which Chen had already mostly agreed to.

Unexpectedly, since its formation, the [Committee to Settle the February 28th Incident] has given no thought to relief work such as medical care for the wounded and compenstation to the killed and so forth. On the contrary, it acted beyond province and on March 7 went so far as to announce a settlement outline containing rebellious elements. Therefore, this committee (including hsien and municipal branch committees) should be abolished.

— Chen Yi, Radio address of March 10, 1947

Meanwhile, Chen had secretly requested military troops to be deployed from Fujian against the Taiwanese insurgents; the Committee was a ruse to allow time for the troops to arrive. On March 8, local forces cleared the streets of Keelung and Taipei with machine gun fire, allowing 8–10,000 police and troops from the Twenty-first Division to land. More than 1,000 unarmed Taiwanese civilians were shot and killed over the next week. Troops were seen robbing civilians and looting. Publicly, Chen stated he had not requested military support, which was supported by a report from Bai Chongxi to Chiang Kai-shek; because of the report, Chiang professed ignorance of conditions in Taiwan and denied that he had dispatched the troops in a meeting with United States ambassador to China John Leighton Stuart in Nanjing. Stuart's independent investigation, led by the American consul in Taipei, concluded that Chen had indeed requested the troops, and by late March 1947, the central executive committee of the KMT recommended that Chen be dismissed as Governor-General over the "merciless brutality" he had shown in suppressing the rebellion. Chen was replaced as governor by Wei Tao-ming after Stuart's report was given to Chiang on April 18, 1947. Wei's position as governor was specifically proscribed from the military authority that Chen's position held as Governor-General, in response to the inefficient government of Chen.

Chen had executed or jailed all the alleged rebel leaders he could identify and catch, and his troops had prosecuted and executed between 3,000 and 4,000 throughout the island, according to a Taiwanese delegation in Nanjing. A key consequence was that "virtually all of the small group of leaders with modern education, administrative experience, and political maturity" were killed. According to reports from foreigners in Taiwan, leaflets signed by Chiang promised leniency for those who had fled the initial wave of killings and urged them to return; many of those who did so were imprisoned or executed. After the initial indiscriminate killing and looting, troops selectively targeted 'elites' such as students, intellectuals, civic leaders, people identified as previously critical of government policies, and prominent businesspeople to eliminate resistance. The total death toll from the incident remains in dispute and has become a political issue in the decades following the end of martial law in 1987.

== Later career ==
Following his dismissal from the post of Taiwan Governor-General, Chen was employed as a consultant. In June 1948, he took the position of provincial chairman of Zhejiang province. In November, he released over a hundred communists scheduled to be executed. In January 1949, Chen Yi thought the KMT position was untenable, so to rescue the 18 million residents of the Nanjing-Shanghai-Hangzhou region from a meaningless war, he attempted to defect to the Chinese Communist Party. Along with his defection, he attempted to induce the garrison military commander Tang Enbo to surrender to the Communist Party. However, Tang informed Chiang Kai-shek that Chen had advised him to rebel against the Kuomintang. Chiang immediately relieved Chen's chairmanship on the charge of collaboration with the Communists. In April 1950, Chen Yi was escorted to Taiwan, and later imprisoned in Keelung. In May 1950, alleged for espionage case, Chiang Kai-shek ordered the Taiwan military court to sentence Chen Yi to death. In the same year on 18 June at 5:00 pm, he was executed at Machangding, Taipei and was buried in Wugu, Taipei County.

On 12 February 2006, a committee member of the Shaoxing CPPCC proposed to restore Chen's old family home, which had been torn down for a bath house.

== Quotes ==
- "Mainland Chinese were advanced enough to enjoy the privileges of constitutional government, but because of long years of despotic Japanese rule, the Formosans were politically retarded and were not capable of carrying on self-government in an intelligent manner." — (1947)
- "It took the Japs [sic] 51 years to dominate this island. I expect to take about five years to re-educate the people so they will be more happy with Chinese administration." — (1947)
- "I never forgot private enterprise. I always intended to re-establish it." — (1947)

== See also ==
- History of Taiwan
- History of the Republic of China
- February 28 Incident
