= Formosa Betrayed (book) =

Book by George H. Kerr

- Cover of the 2017 edition
- Author: George H. Kerr
- Cover artist: Li Jun
- Language: English
- Publisher: Houghton Mifflin
- Publication date: 1965
- Pages: 456
- ISBN: 978-1910736-53-1

Formosa Betrayed (Chinese: 被出賣的台灣) is a 1965 book written by George H. Kerr, a US diplomatic officer in Taiwan, who witnessed the February 28 Incident, and the corruption and killings committed by the KMT in Taiwan after World War II. It is one of the most influential books about Taiwan's transition from Japanese colonial rule.

Kerr was working for the American Foreign Service at the time of the transition, and was present in Taiwan during the KMT occupation and resulting aftermath. Formosa Betrayed sharply rebuked the KMT administration and made arguments in favor of Taiwan independence.

The book was originally published in 1965 by Houghton Mifflin. A Chinese-language translation was made in 1974, the English-language version was republished in 1976 by Da Capo Press, a second English-language edition was published by Taiwan Publishing Co. in 1992, and a new Chinese-language translation was released in 2014.

== Editions ==
- Kerr, George H. (1965). Formosa Betrayed. Boston: Houghton Mifflin. OCLC 242620. OL 5948105M.
- Kerr, George H.; 陳榮成 (1974). 被出賣的台灣 [Taiwan Betrayed] (in Chinese). Taipei: 前衞. ISBN 9579512191.
- Kerr, George H. (1976) [1965]. Formosa Betrayed. New York: Da Capo Press. ISBN 0306707624. LCCN 76010805. OL 4882082M.
- Kerr, George H. (1992) [1965]. Formosa Betrayed. California: Taiwan Publishing Co. OCLC 895250964.
- Kerr, George H. (November 1997). Formosa Betrayed (PDF). Taiwan Publishing Co. Archived from the original (PDF) on 2008-10-29.
- Kerr, George H. Formosa Betrayed (HTML ed.). Romanization.com.
- Kerr, George H. (May 2017). Formosa Betrayed. Camphor Press. ISBN 978-1-910736-53-1.
