= George H. Kerr =

American diplomat

George Henry Kerr (Chinese: 葛超智; pinyin: Gé Chāozhì; Wade–Giles: Ko^{2} Ch‘ao^{1}-chih^{4}; November 7, 1911 – August 27, 1992), was an American diplomat during World War II, and in later years he was a writer and an academic. His published works and archived papers cover "economic and political affairs in Taiwan in the 1930s and 1940s, Taiwan's transition from Japanese rule before and during World War II to postwar Chinese rule, Taiwanese rebellion against Chinese rule in 1947, and U.S. foreign policy toward Taiwan." His works also include "information about economic and political conditions in Okinawa and the Ryukyu Islands after World War II."

== Early life ==
Kerr was born in Pennsylvania. He was a student in Japan during 1935 through 1937; and he was an English teacher in Taihoku, Japanese Taiwan, during 1937 through 1940.

== Military career ==
As a lieutenant in the United States Naval Reserve, Kerr worked for the U.S. Navy as a Taiwan expert and instructed future military government officers during the Pacific War. In 1942–1943, Kerr was an analyst and consultant on Formosa in the U.S. Department of War. In 1944–1946, he was the director of the Formosa Research Unit at the Naval School of Military Government and Administration for the U.S. Navy at Columbia University in New York.

== Diplomatic career ==
After the war, Kerr returned to Taiwan in 1945 as an assistant naval attaché, escorting the newly appointed Chinese Governor-General Chen Yi to the Japanese surrender of Taiwan on 25 October 1945 (Retrocession Day). Kerr was present in his official capacity as a civil affairs officer of the U.S. Navy Attache's Office to the Republic of China government in Chongqing. He ensured that the English version of the Japanese Instrument of Surrender did not exclude the official role of the U.S., unlike the Chinese translation. Later, he became a diplomat at the U.S. embassy in China. He was a Foreign Service staff officer and vice-consul in Taipei. He has written about his eyewitness account of the February 28 Incident in 1947.

It was not till the early 1950s that he realized his wish to visit Okinawa, and with it a military commission to write a history, the purpose of which was to revive an independent Ryūkyūan identity. An able team of researcher-translators scoured Japan for historical sources on Okinawa. Then Kerr synthesized the material into the book Okinawa: Kingdom and Province (1953), and then in Japanese as Ryūkyū no rekishi (1955). In the meantime, Kerr began a revision based on additional research as well as criticism of the first two books and published a 1958 volume, Okinawa: The History of an Island People.

== Academic career ==
Kerr was a lecturer at the University of Washington during 1947–1949; and he was a lecturer at Stanford University and the University of California, Berkeley in 1949–1950. For the next five years, he was a research associate at the Hoover Institution.

The open sections of Kerr's papers are available at the Okinawa Prefectural Archives in Haebaru, others at the Stanford, Taipei and Ryudai libraries.

== Later life ==
Kerr's publications on Taiwan are numerous. He championed the cause of Taiwan independence from China, thereby making himself a high-profile enemy to both Chiang Kai-shek and Mao Zedong. (Chiang complained and Kerr lost his job at Stanford University.) He also drafted a long book on 19th century Hawaii, thus making his life's work of a piece: the history of Pacific Ocean marine frontiers.

He is an author of many books and of numerous articles concerning Japan, Okinawa and Taiwan. Among them are the Formosa: Licensed Revolution and the Home Rule Movement, 1895-1945, Formosa Betrayed (1965), Descriptive Summary: George H. Kerr papers, 1943-1951, Okinawa: The History of an Island People (1958), and The Taiwan Confrontation Crisis (1986).

Formosa Betrayed was one of the most influential books about Taiwan's transition from Japanese colonial rule to the rule of the Kuomintang (KMT, Chinese Nationalist Party) administration. George Kerr was working for the American Foreign Service at the time of the transition and was present in Taiwan for the KMT occupation and resulting aftermath. Formosa Betrayed made a sharp rebuke of the Nationalist administration and made arguments in favor of Taiwanese independence. The book was republished in 1976 by Da Capo Press. In 1992 a second edition was published by Taiwan Publishing Co. The book is now legally available online (see link below).

Okinawa: The History of an Island People covers the legendary past to the Battle of Okinawa in 542 very read-able pages. Eleven years before he died, Kerr wrote that 13,000 copies had been sold. The book was out of print for a time, but Tuttle, the original publishers, reprinted it in 2000, adding a new introduction and an appendix by Okinawa history scholar Mitsugu Sakihara.

He died at the age of 80 on August 27, 1992, in Honolulu, Hawaii.

== Selected works ==
- Kerr, George H. (2000) [1958]. Okinawa, the History of an Island People. Afterword by Mitsugu Sakihara. Tokyo: Tuttle. ISBN 9780804820875.
- Kerr, George H. (1986). The Taiwan confrontation crisis. Washington, D.C.: Formosan Association for Public Affairs. OCLC 15681913.
- Kerr, George H. (1974). Formosa: Licensed Revolution and the Home Rule Movement, 1895-1945. Honolulu: University of Hawaii Press. ISBN 9780824803230. OCLC 1174316.
- Kerr, George H. (1965). Formosa Betrayed. Boston: Houghton Mifflin. OCLC 242620. OL 5948105M.
- Kerr, George H.; Higa, Shuncho (1961). Bibliography of the Ryukyus. Nishihara, Okinawa: University of the Ryukyus. OCLC 8973627.
- Kerr, George H. (1959). Science Information Services in Japan, a Brief Survey. Tokyo. OCLC 22194372.
- Kerr, George H. (1958). Okinawa: the History of an Island People. Tokyo: C. E. Tuttle Co. OCLC 468346635.
- Kerr, George H. (1953). Ryukyu Kingdom and Province before 1945. Washington: Pacific Science Board, National Academy of Sciences, National Research Council (US). OCLC 5455582.
- Kerr, George H. (1952). The Ryūkyū Islands: A Preliminary Checklist of Reference Materials Arranged Alphabetically. Higa Shuncho and others. National Research Council (U.S.). Pacific Science Board. OCLC 79293918.
- Kerr, George H.; Stuart, John Leighton (April 21, 1947). Memorandum on the Situation in Taiwan (Report). American Embassy, Nanking, China. Telegram No. 689. reprinted in United States relations with China, with special reference to the period 1944-1949, based on the files of the Department of State. Far Eastern Series. Compiled by Dean Acheson. Washington: U.S. Govt. Print. Off. August 1949. pp. 923–938. hdl:2027/umn.31951d01115459w. OCLC 664471448.
