= Kagi Shrine =

Former Shinto shrine in Taiwan

Coordinates: 23°28′53″N 120°28′09″E

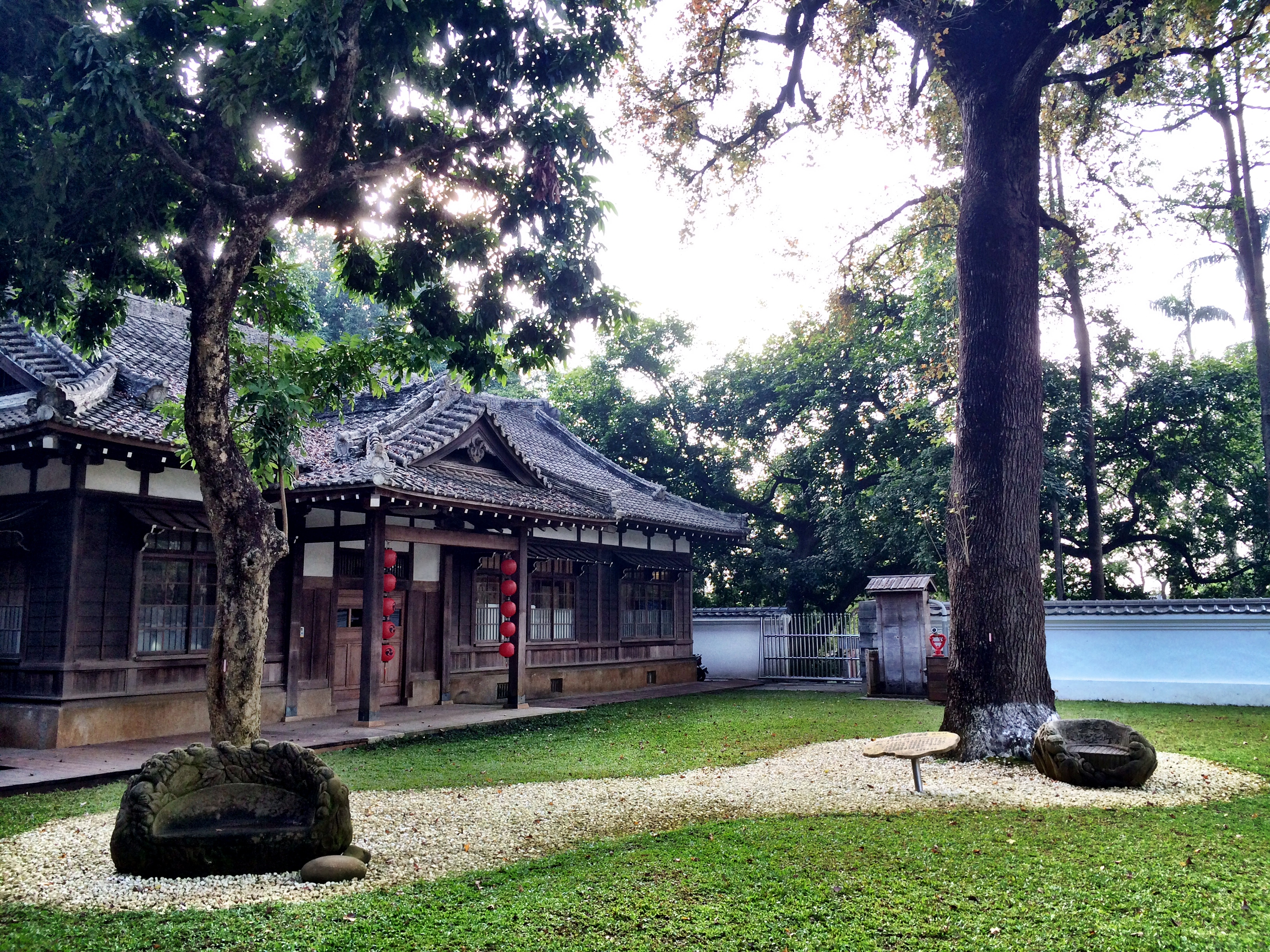
Chiayi City Historical Relic Museum.

Kagi Shrine (Japanese: 嘉義神社, Hepburn: Kagi jinja) was a Shinto shrine located in previously Soa-a-teng (Chinese: 山仔頂; Pe̍h-ōe-jī: Soaⁿ-á-téng), Kagi City, Tainan Prefecture, Japanese Taiwan (modern-day Chiayi Park, Chiayi City, Taiwan).

The shrine was built on 28 October 1915 (Taishō 4) facing south but later altered in 1942 (Shōwa 17) to face west. The shrine was originally categorized as a prefectural shrine in 1917 (Taishō 6) but elevated to rank of small shrine (国幣小社, kokuhei-shōsha) in 1944 (Shōwa 19). Prince Yoshihisa, Ōkunitama no Mikoto (大国魂命), Ōnamuchi no Mikoto, Sukunahikona no Mikoto (少彦名命) and Amaterasu were enshrined as deities.

The honden (main hall) was turned into a martyrs' shrine by the Republic of China government after World War II but was destroyed in a fire on 24 April 1994. The main office and purification hall now serve as the Chiayi City Historical Relics Museum.

In 1998 the Chiayi Tower was built in place of the main hall, the design was inspired by an indigenous mythological tale about the creator of the world. In Chinese the tower is called Sun-Shooting Tower and houses an observation deck.

The existing main office (社務所, shamusho) and purification hall (斎館, saikan) are wooden structures built in the classical Japanese Shoin-zukuri architectural style and underwent repair work before being opened to the general public on 5 January 2001 as the Chiayi City Historical Relics Museum. The area became part of Chiayi Park and the temizuya (purification pavilion), sandō (pathway), stone tōrō lantern, and Komainu statues amongst other things still exist today.

== Gallery ==
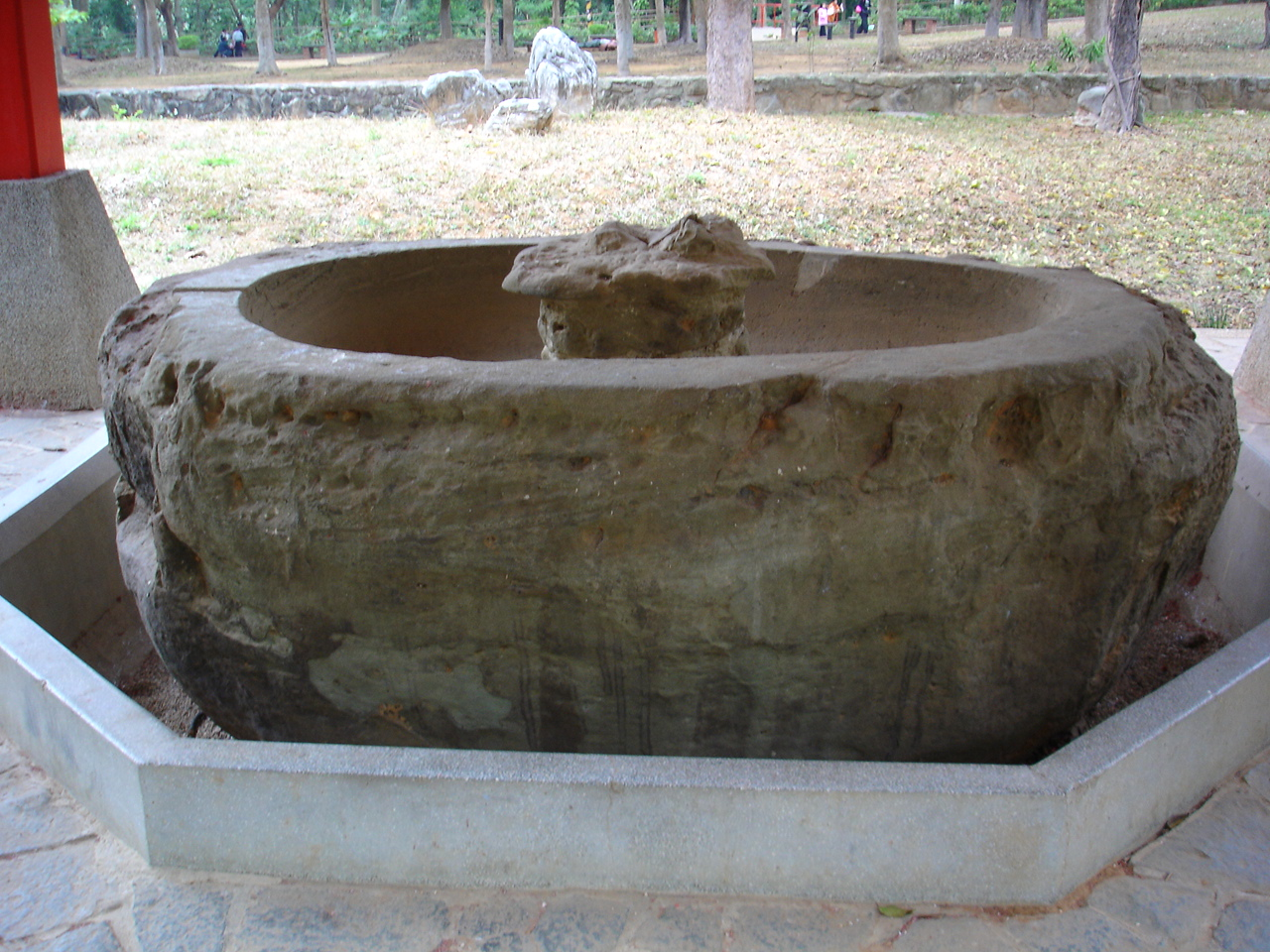
Temizuya

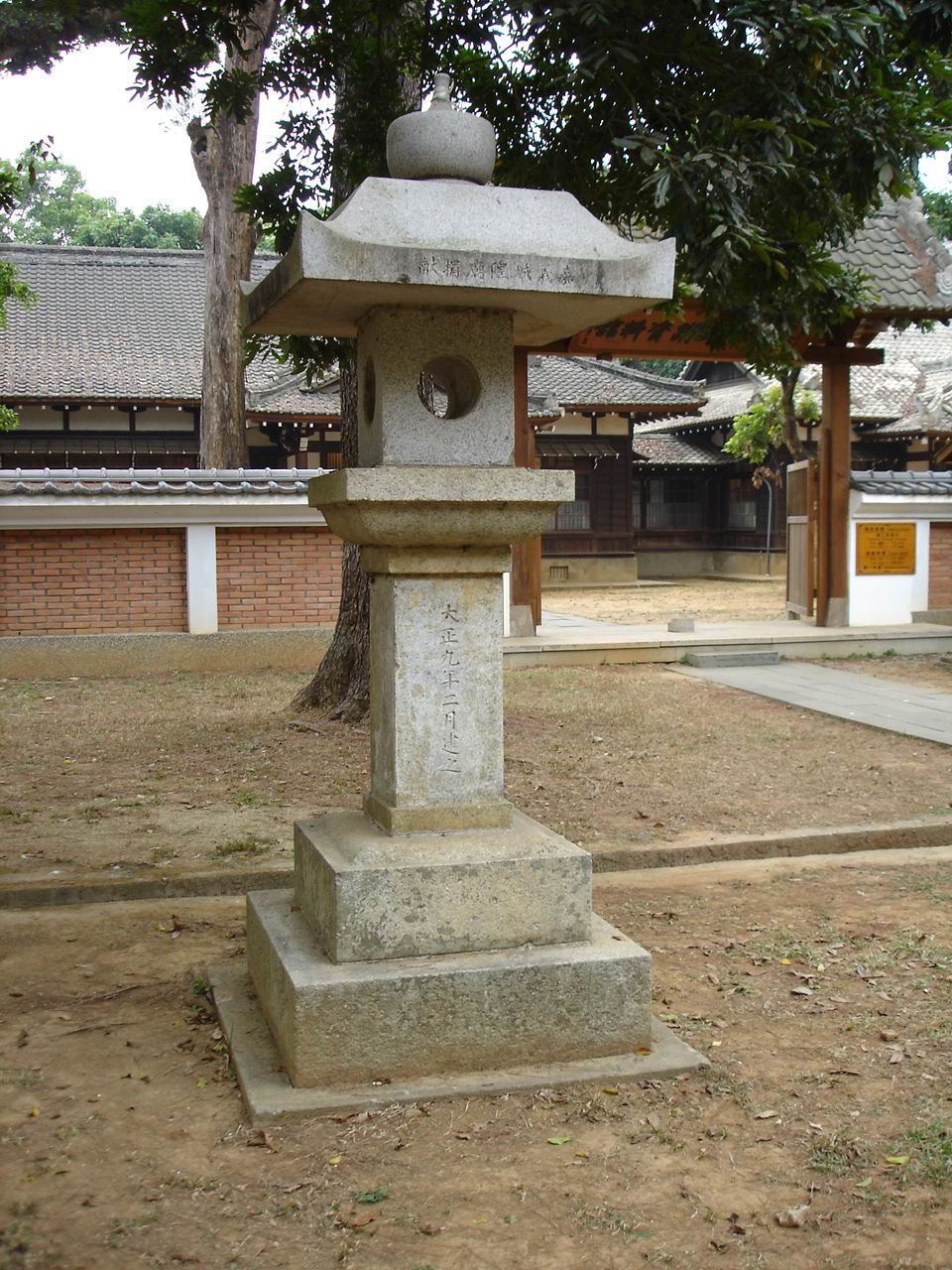
Stone tōrō lantern

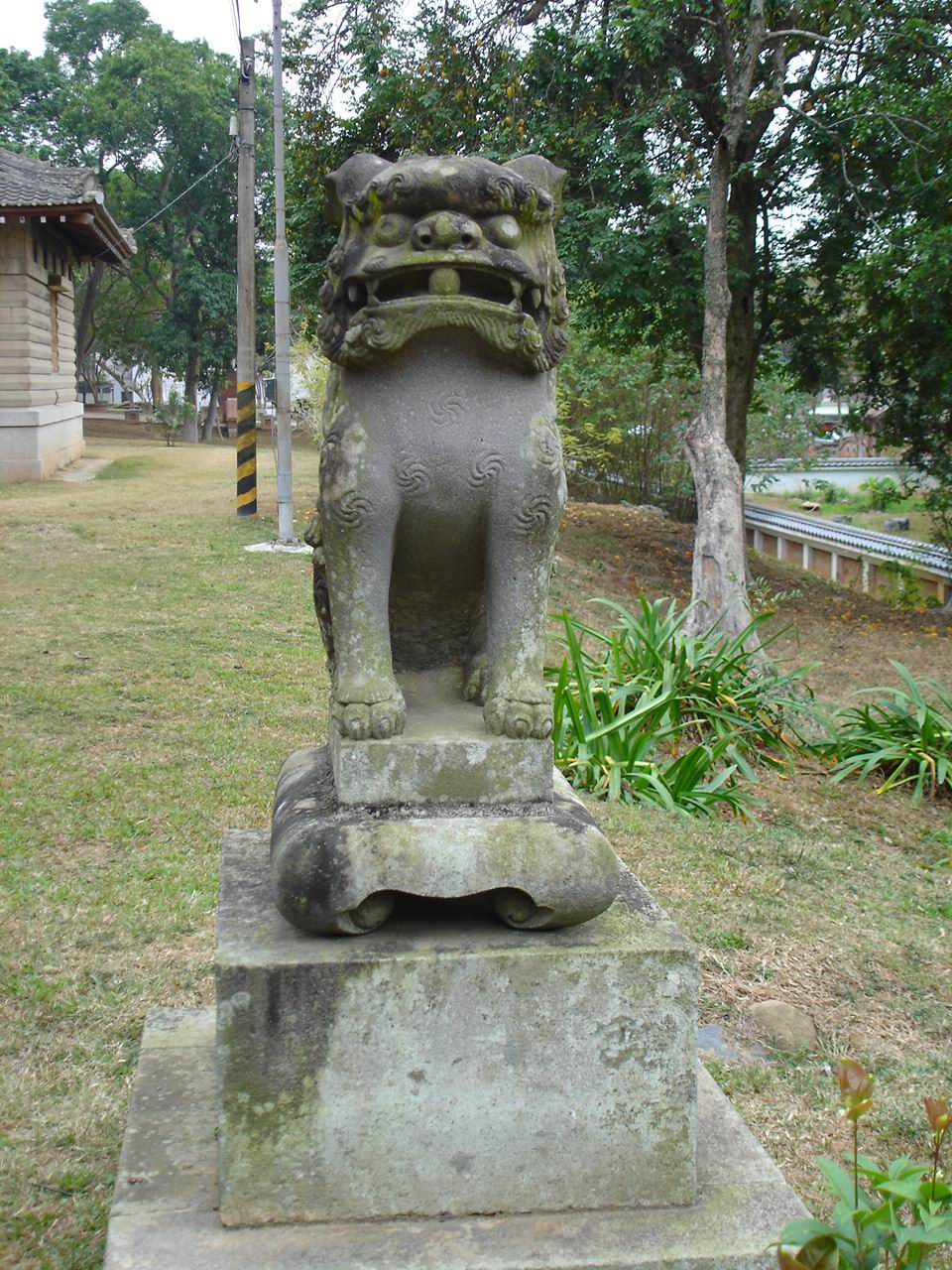
Komainu statues

== See also ==
- Chiayi Cheng Huang Temple
- Chiayi Confucian Temple
- Chiayi Jen Wu Temple
- List of Shinto shrines in Taiwan
