= Chiayi Station =

Chiayi station (Chinese: 嘉義車站; pinyin: Jīayì chēzhàn) may refer to the following stations in Chiayi or Chiayi County, Taiwan:

- Chiayi HSR station, a Taiwan High Speed Rail station in Taibao, opened in 2007
- Chiayi railway station, a TRA station on the West Coast and Alishan Forest Railway Main lines in West District, opened in 1902
