= Zhecheng Cultural Park =

Venue in Liujiao, Chiayi County, Taiwan

- 蔗埕文化園區
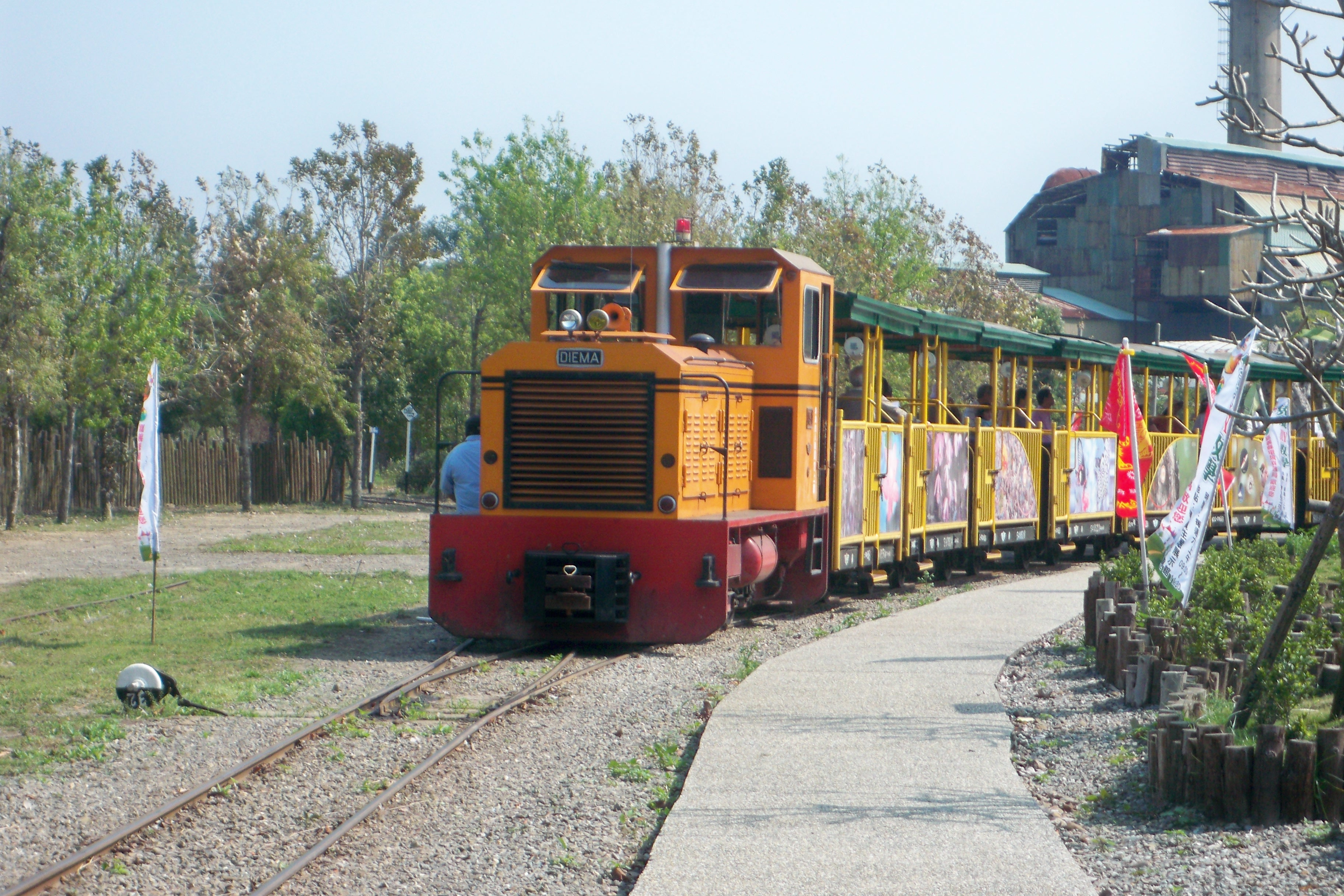
- Sugar cane trains

- Taiwan
- Former names: Suantou Sugar Factory
- Location: Lioujiao, Chiayi County, Taiwan
- Coordinates: 23°28′48.9″N 120°17′58.4″E
- Type: cultural park

Construction
- Built: 1906

The Zhecheng Cultural Park (traditional Chinese: 蔗埕文化園區; simplified Chinese: 蔗埕文化园区; pinyin: Zhèchéng Wénhuà Yuánqū) is a multi-purpose park in Gongchang Village, Lioujiao Township, Chiayi County, Taiwan.

== History ==
The park was originally the area of Suantou Sugar Factory (Chinese: 蒜頭糖廠; pinyin: Suàntóu Táng Chǎng) which was built in 1906 as one of the three largest sugar factory in Taiwan at that time. In September 2001, the factory was damaged by Typhoon Nari which caused the sugar production a complete halt due to the damaged machines.

== Events ==
The park regularly hold exhibitions.

== Transportation ==
The park is accessible northwest from Chiayi Station of Taiwan High Speed Rail (THSR). In 2017, the government planned to extend the Taiwan Sugar Railways from THSR Chiayi Station to the park and also the Southern Branch of the National Palace Museum.

== See also ==
- List of tourist attractions in Taiwan
