= Chiayi Park =

Park in East, Chiayi City, Taiwan

- Zhongshan Park
- 嘉義公園
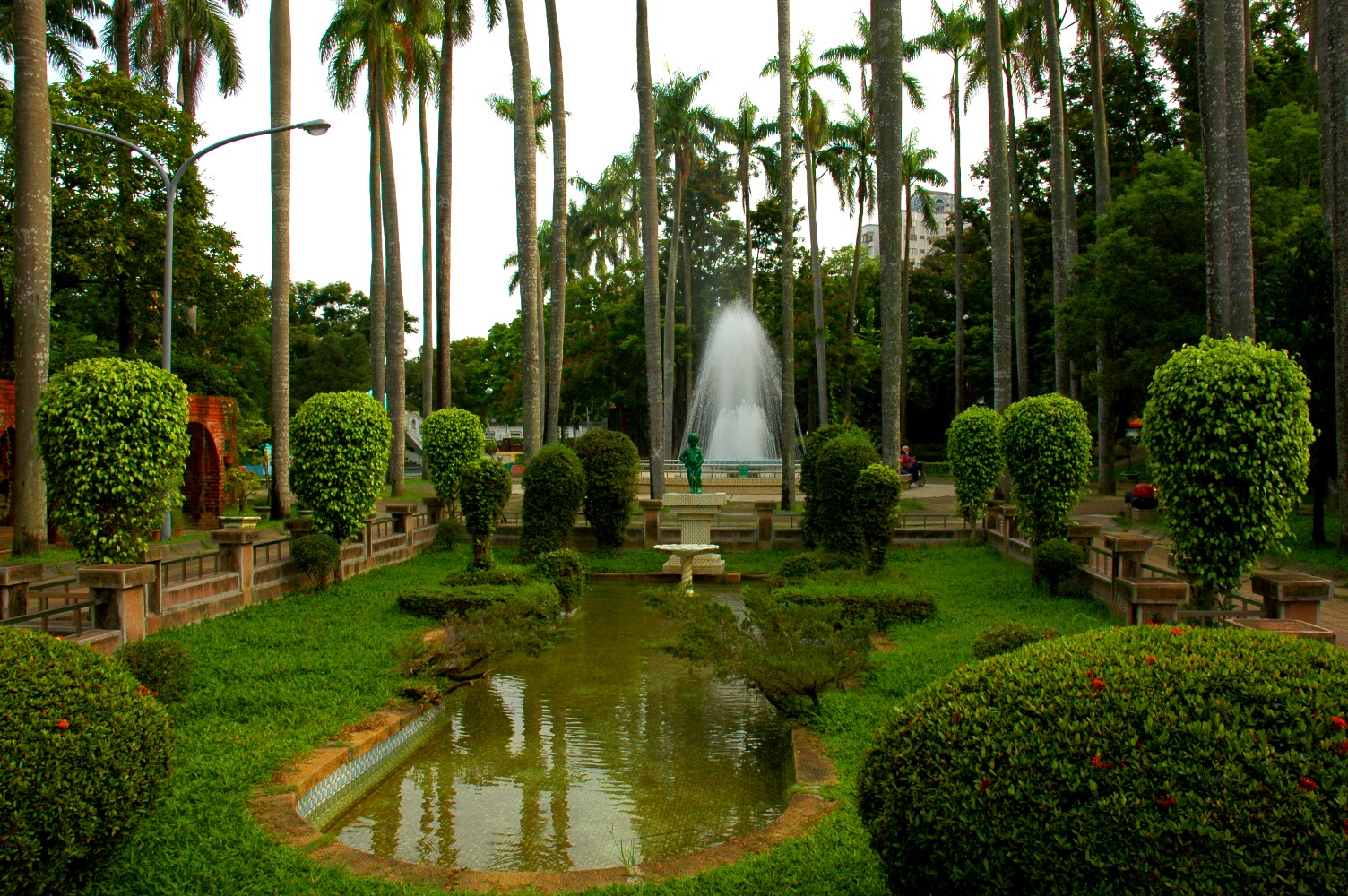
- Interactive map of Chiayi Park
- Type: park
- Location: East, Chiayi City, Taiwan
- Coordinates: 23°28′58″N 120°27′49″E
- Area: 26.8 hectares (66 acres)
- Opened: 1911

Chiayi Park (traditional Chinese: 嘉義公園; simplified Chinese: 嘉义公园; pinyin: Jiāyì Gōngyuán; Wade–Giles: Chia-i Kungyüan) is a park at East District, Chiayi City, Taiwan.

== History ==
Originally named "Chiayi Park," the park was established in 1911 during the Meiji era of Japanese colonial rule. It was renamed Zhongshan Park during the Kuomintang government era but returned to its original name in 1997.

Covering 268,000 square meters, Chiayi Park has expanded to include bridges, roads, and a thoughtfully designed landscape. The park's appeal lies in its blend of towering old trees, waterside pavilions, and historic landmarks, such as the Martyrs' Shrine, Chiayi Tower, and the Alishan Forest Railway No. 21 steam locomotive. The park's northeastern corner also houses the Forestry and Agricultural Research Institute.

== Architecture ==
The park spans over an area of 26.8 hectares. The park features the Sun-Shooting Tower, Chiayi Confucian Temple and Kagi Shrine.

== Transportation ==
- Chiayi City Bus
  - yellow,yellow A
  - green,green A
- Chiayi BRT BRT1(7211)

== See also ==
- List of parks in Taiwan
