= The World Coffee Museum =

- Bảo tàng Thế giới Cà phê
- Established: 23 November 2018
- Location: Nguyen Dinh Chieu Street, Tan Loi Ward, Buon Ma Thuot, Đắk Lắk Province, Vietnam
- Coordinates: 12.6909°N 108.0447°E
- Type: Coffee museum
- Visitors: 5 million (2018–2023)
- Website: baotangthegioicaphe.com

The World Coffee Museum (Vietnamese: Bảo tàng Thế giới Cà phê) is a museum dedicated to the history, culture, and production of coffee located in Buon Ma Thuot, Đắk Lắk Province, Vietnam. Opened in November 2018, the museum houses a collection of over 11,000 artifacts related to coffee from around the world and serves as a cultural and educational hub for coffee enthusiasts.

== History ==
The museum was established by the Trung Nguyên Group as part of its efforts to promote Buon Ma Thuot as the "global coffee capital". It was developed in collaboration with the Kaffeemuseum Burg in Germany, which contributed a significant portion of the artifacts. The museum officially opened to the public on 23 November 2018. By November 2023, it had welcomed five million visitors. The museum has hosted various events, including exhibitions on coffee history and cultural programs, and has been visited by notable figures such as Vietnamese Deputy Prime Minister Trương Hòa Bình in 2019.

== Architecture ==
Designed by the architectural firm a21studĩo, the museum's structure is inspired by the traditional longhouses of the Central Highlands ethnic groups, such as the Êđê. The building covers nearly 2 hectares and features a modern interpretation of indigenous architecture, blending curved roofs and open spaces to create an immersive environment.

== Collection and exhibitions ==
The museum's collection is organized around three "coffee civilizations": Ottoman, Roman, and Thiền (Zen).

- The Ottoman section includes artifacts from the 9th to 16th centuries, focusing on coffee's spiritual and cultural significance in the Middle East and surrounding regions.
- The Roman section covers items from the 17th to 21st centuries, emphasizing European innovations in coffee processing and consumption.
- The Thiền (Zen) section, unique to the museum, draws from Eastern philosophies, incorporating Vietnamese and Asian elements to promote coffee as a tool for mindfulness and harmony.

The exhibits include tools, machinery, and cultural items spanning global coffee history, with interactive displays engaging visitors' senses. Notable programs include the "Coffee Zen Tour" for wellness experiences and 3D mapping shows on coffee civilizations.

== See also ==
- Bramah Tea and Coffee Museum
- Dubai Coffee Museum
- Ping Huang Coffee Museum
- List of food and beverage museums
