= Dubai Coffee Museum =

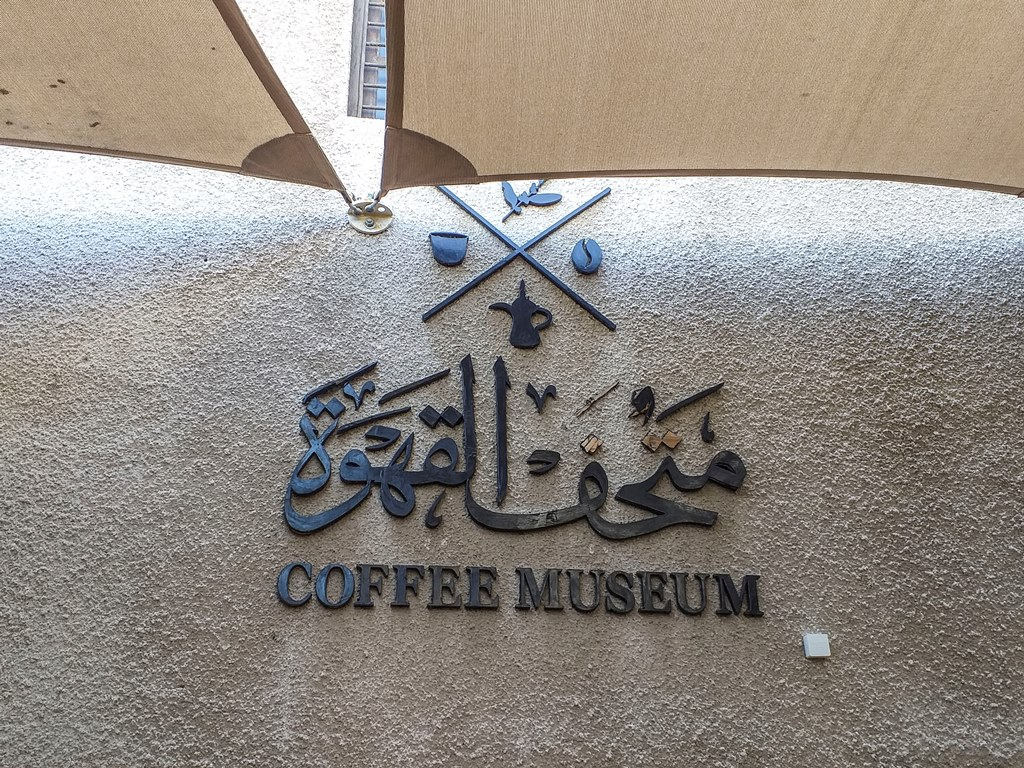
- Location: Al Bastakiya, Dubai, United Arab Emirates
- Coordinates: 25°15′48.5″N 55°18′02.7″E
- Type: museum
- Website: coffeemuseum.ae

The Dubai Coffee Museum is a museum about coffee located in the Al Fahidi Historical Neighbourhood of Dubai, United Arab Emirates. It focuses on the history of coffee, coffee culture, and the working conditions of coffee plantation workers.

It provides intel on the importance of coffee in different cultures across the globe, as well as the Arabic traditions, its preparations like roasting and grinding, the apparatuses used through time, and rusted beans found worldwide. The museum spreads over two floors with a museum shop on the ground floor.

== Exhibits ==
On the ground floor, roasting and brewing styles from various countries and antique items are presented. Coffee grinders, roasters, pots, kettles, weighing scales, sorters, torches for grinding coffee, natural stone coffee grinders, bowls, and other coffee memorabilia are showcased. An intricately restored Majlis room filled with carpets, dallahs, and pillows offer a glimpse of the traditional Emirati style of coffee consumption. Moreover, the history of the coffee bean is explored.

The first floor features a literary section with a wide selection of coffee books and maps dating back to the 18th century about the global history of coffee and coffee plantation workers. Visitors can learn about the entire process, from bean selection to roasting, as well as the brewing techniques unique to each coffee culture.

== Gallery ==
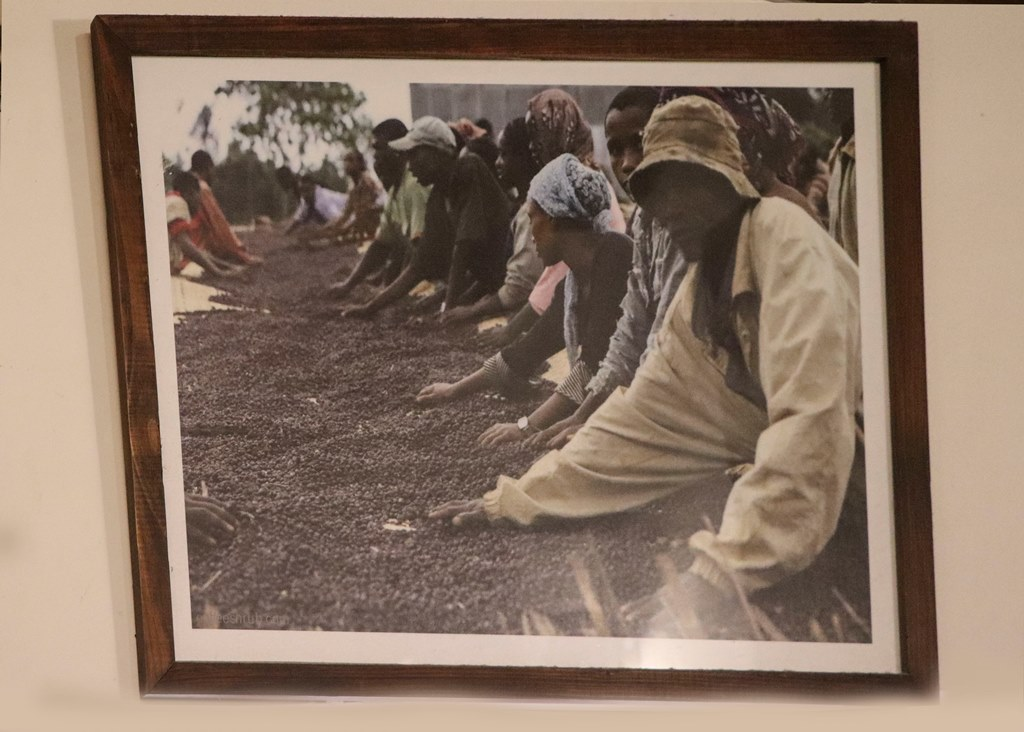
Coffee plantation workers

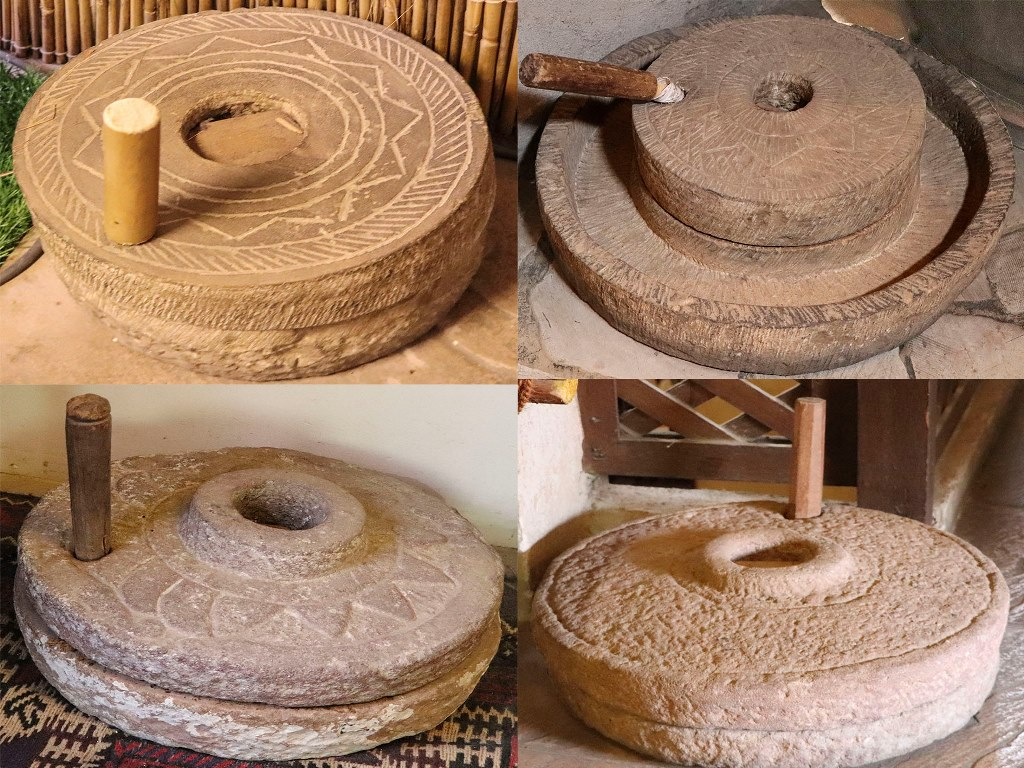
Collection of natural stone coffee grinders

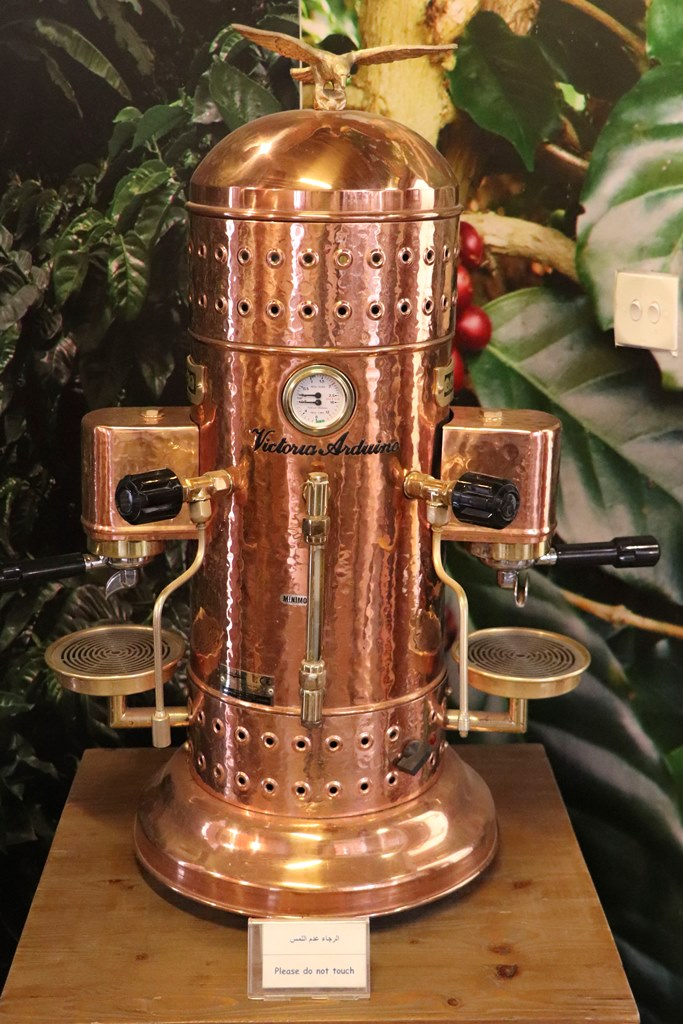
Antique coffee machine

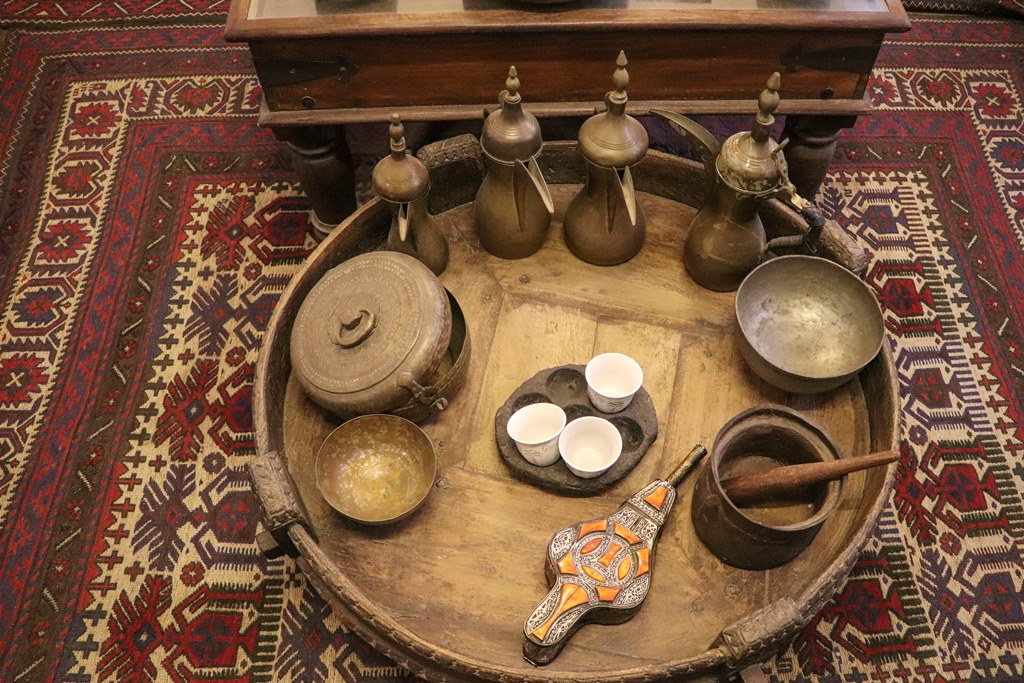
Majlis room

== See also ==
- Bramah Tea and Coffee Museum
- Ping Huang Coffee Museum
- The World Coffee Museum
- List of food and beverage museums
