= Bramah Tea and Coffee Museum =

Former museum in London

Coordinates: 51°30′18″N 0°5′41″W

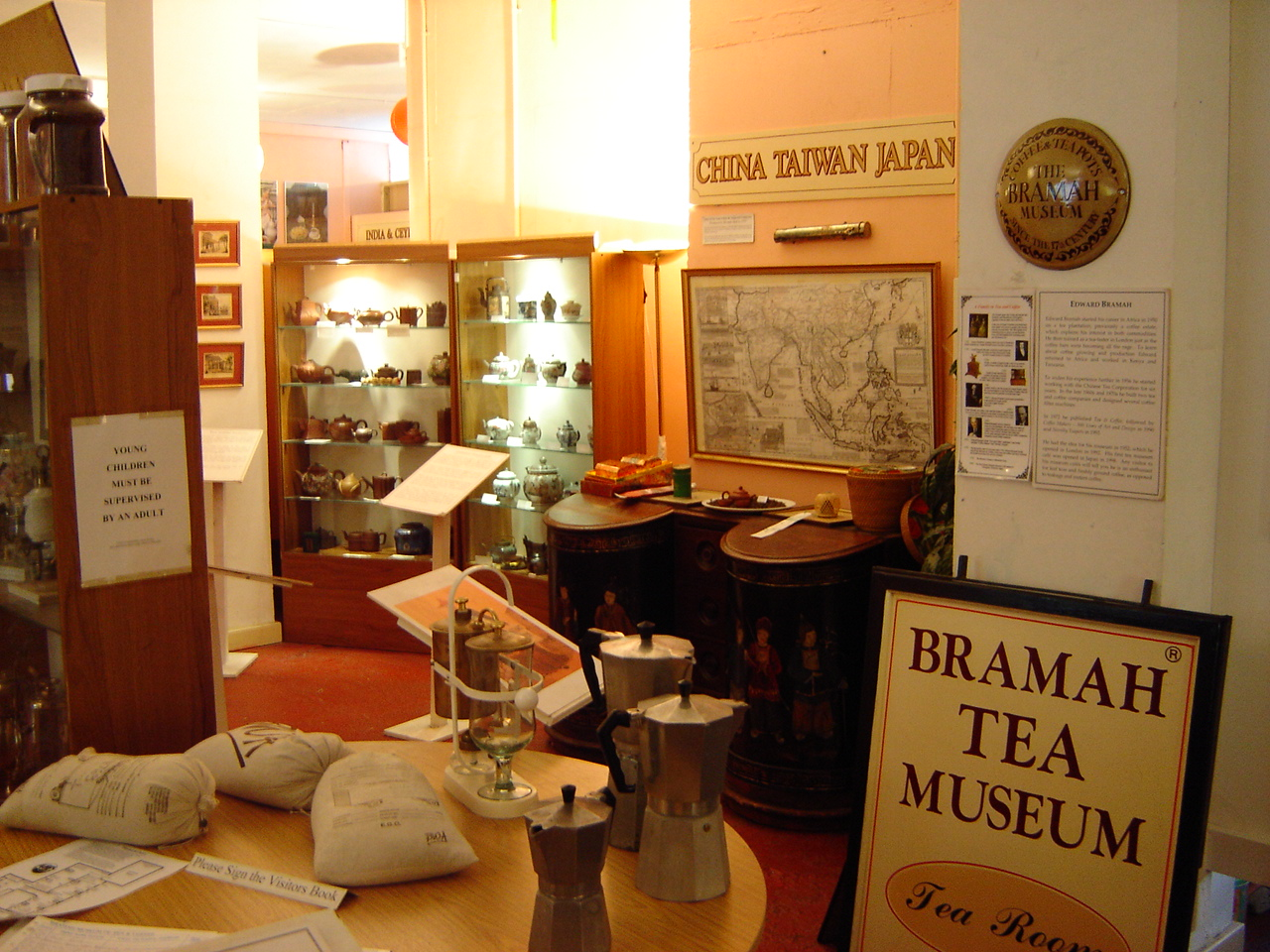
Interior of the museum (October 2007).

The Bramah Tea and Coffee Museum was a museum in southeast London. It was the world's first museum devoted to the history of tea and coffee, covering 400 years of commercial and social history of two commodities, since their arrival in Europe from Africa and the Far East.

The museum was opened by Edward Bramah in 1992, 40 years after he had first had the idea. It was formerly at Butler's Wharf. It then moved to 40 Southwark Street in SE1, very close to London Bridge station and Borough Market. At this location the museum and tearoom would open daily serving coffee and tea.

Edward Bramah died aged 76 at Christchurch, Dorset, on 15 January 2008. Despite his illness, Bramah had been working on a book which was to be called Britain's Tea Heritage.

The museum closed that year. There were plans for redevelopment or possible relocation, but it never reopened.

== See also ==
- Dubai Coffee Museum
- Ping Huang Coffee Museum
- The World Coffee Museum
- List of food and beverage museums
