= Liujiao =

Rural township in Chiayi County, Taiwan

Coordinates: 23.513554°N 120.269504°E

Lioujiao Township 六腳鄉
- Rural township
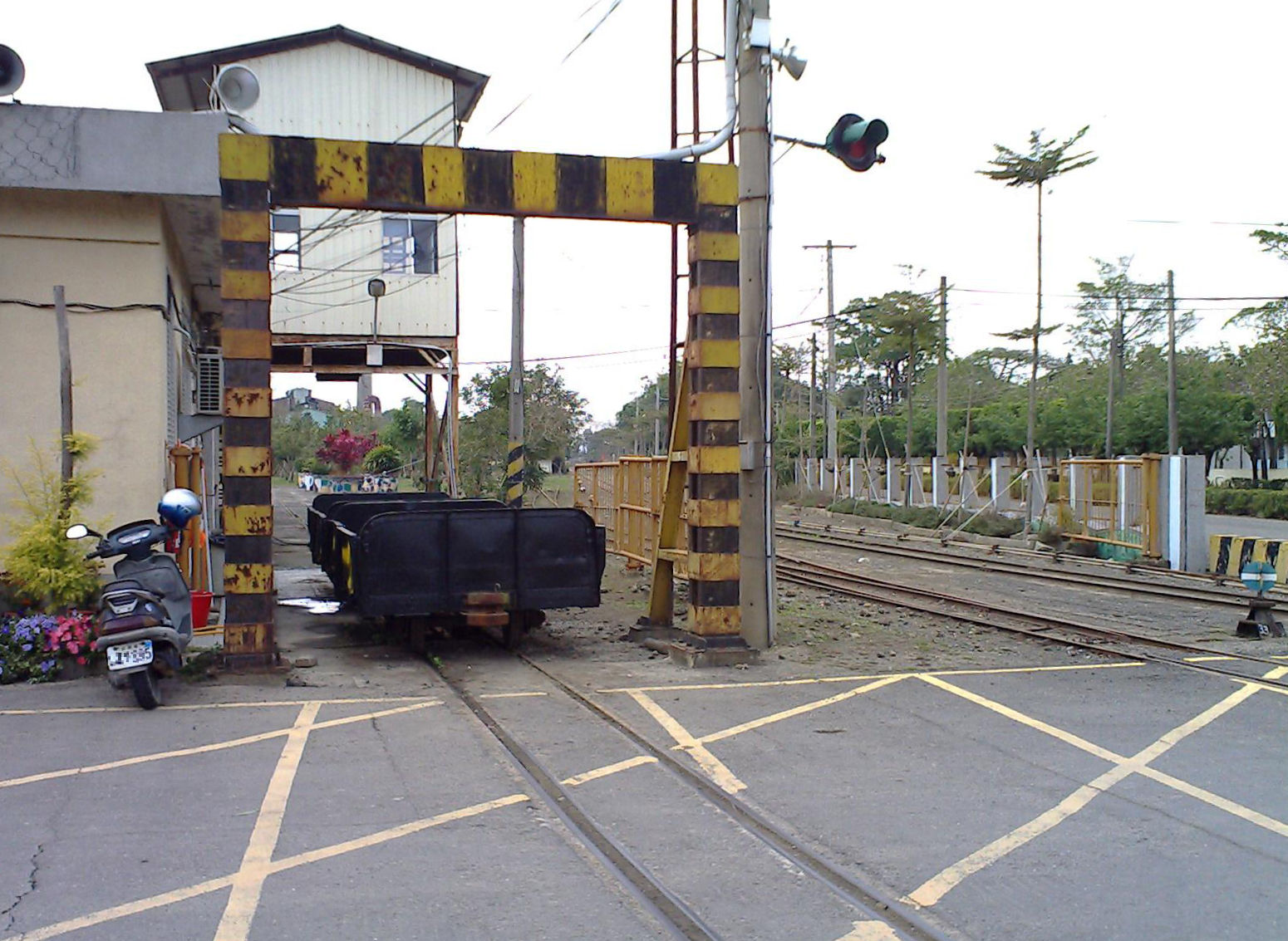

- 嘉義縣六腳鄉公所; Lioujiao Township Office

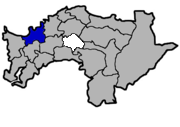
- Lioujiao Township in Chiayi County
- Location: Chiayi County, Taiwan

Area
  - Total: 62 km^{2} (24 sq mi)

Population (May 2022)
  - Total: 21,506
- Website: lioujiao.cyhg.gov.tw (in Chinese) lioujiao.cyhg.gov.tw/en (in English)

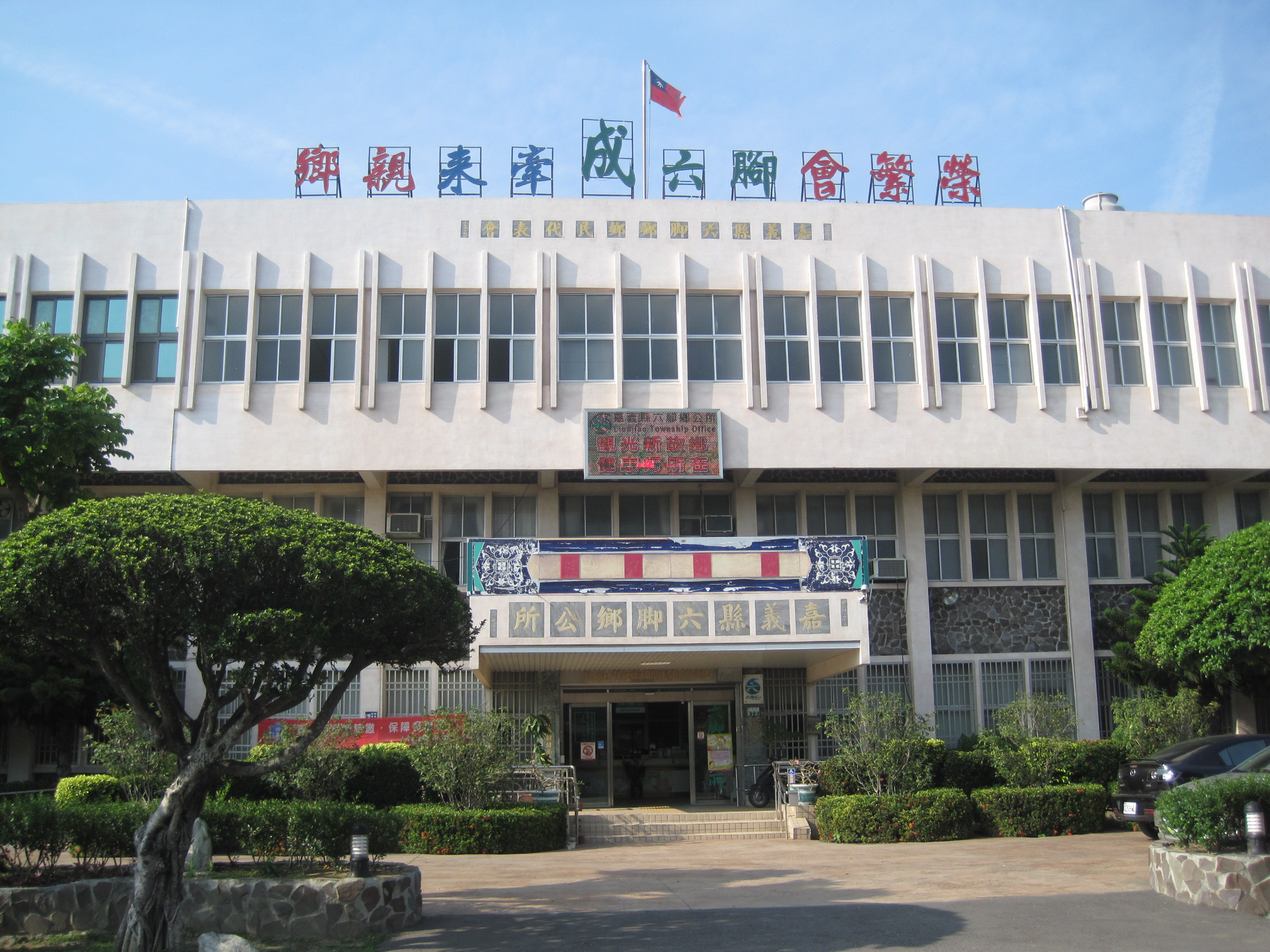
Lioujiao Township Office

Lioujiao Township (Chinese: 六腳鄉; Hanyu Pinyin: Liùjiǎo Xiāng; Tongyong Pinyin: Liòujiǎo Siang) is a rural township in Chiayi County, Taiwan.

== History ==
After the World War II in 1945, Lioujiao Township Office was established on 18 January 1946 as part of Dongshan Township, Tainan County. On 25 October 1950, Lioujiao Township was readjusted to be part of Chiayi County.

== Geography ==
It has a population total of 21,506 and an area of 62.2619 square kilometres.

== Administrative divisions ==
Bengshan, Fongmei/Fengmei, Gangmei, Gengliao, Gongchang, Gulin, Lioudou/Liudou, Lioujiao/Liujiao, Liounan/Liunan, Lunyang, Sanyi, Shuanghan, Suannan, Suantou, Suandong/Suantung, Sucuo, Tanci/Tanqi, Tushih/Tushi, Wanbei, Wannan, Sicuo/Xicuo, Yongsian/Yongxian, Yuliao, Jhengyi/Zhengyi and Jhuben/Zhuben Village.

== Tourist attractions ==
- Tomb of General Wang De-lu
- Zhecheng Cultural Park

== Transportation ==
- Beigang Tourist Bridge

== Notable natives ==
- Liao Cheng-hao, Minister of Justice (1996–1998)
