= Chiayi Jen Wu Temple =

Chinese temple in East, Chiayi City, Taiwan

- 嘉義仁武宮
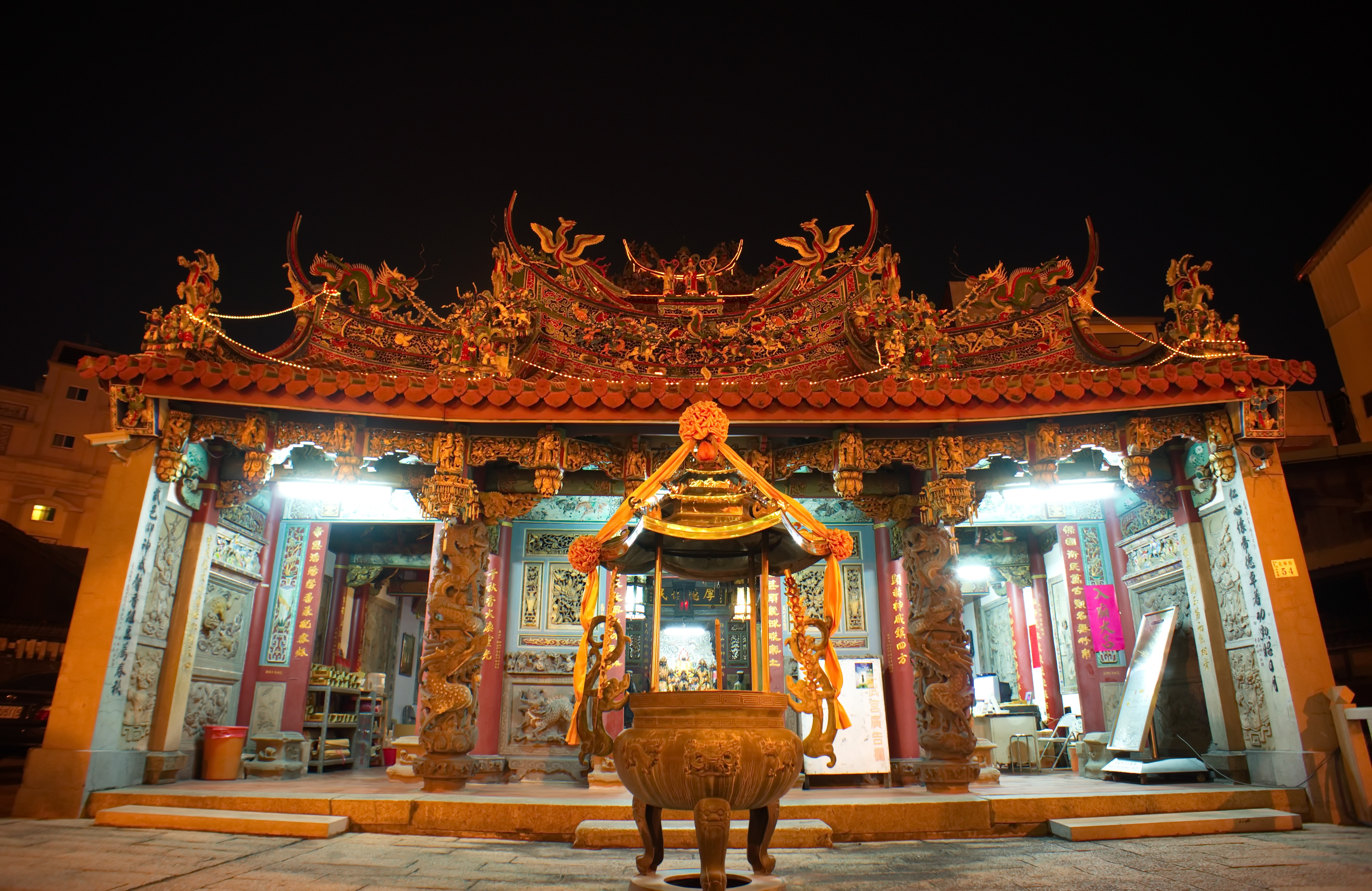

- Location within Chiayi City

Location
- Location: East, Chiayi City, Taiwan
- Interactive map of Chiayi Jen Wu Temple
- Coordinates: 23°28′53.6″N 120°27′3″E

Architecture
- Type: temple
- Completed: 1677

The Chiayi Jen Wu Temple (traditional Chinese: 嘉義仁武宮; simplified Chinese: 嘉义仁武宫; pinyin: Jiāyì Rénwǔ Gōng) is a temple dedicated to Baosheng Dadi and located in East District, Chiayi City, Taiwan.

== History ==
The temple was constructed in 1677. Materials for the temple building construction were imported from Fujian.

== Transportation ==
The temple is accessible within walking distance east from Chiayi Station of Taiwan Railway.

== See also ==
- Chiayi Cheng Huang Temple
- Chiayi Confucian Temple
- List of temples in Taiwan
- List of tourist attractions in Taiwan
