= Chiayi HSR station =

Railway station in Chiayi, Taiwan

Chiayi 嘉義
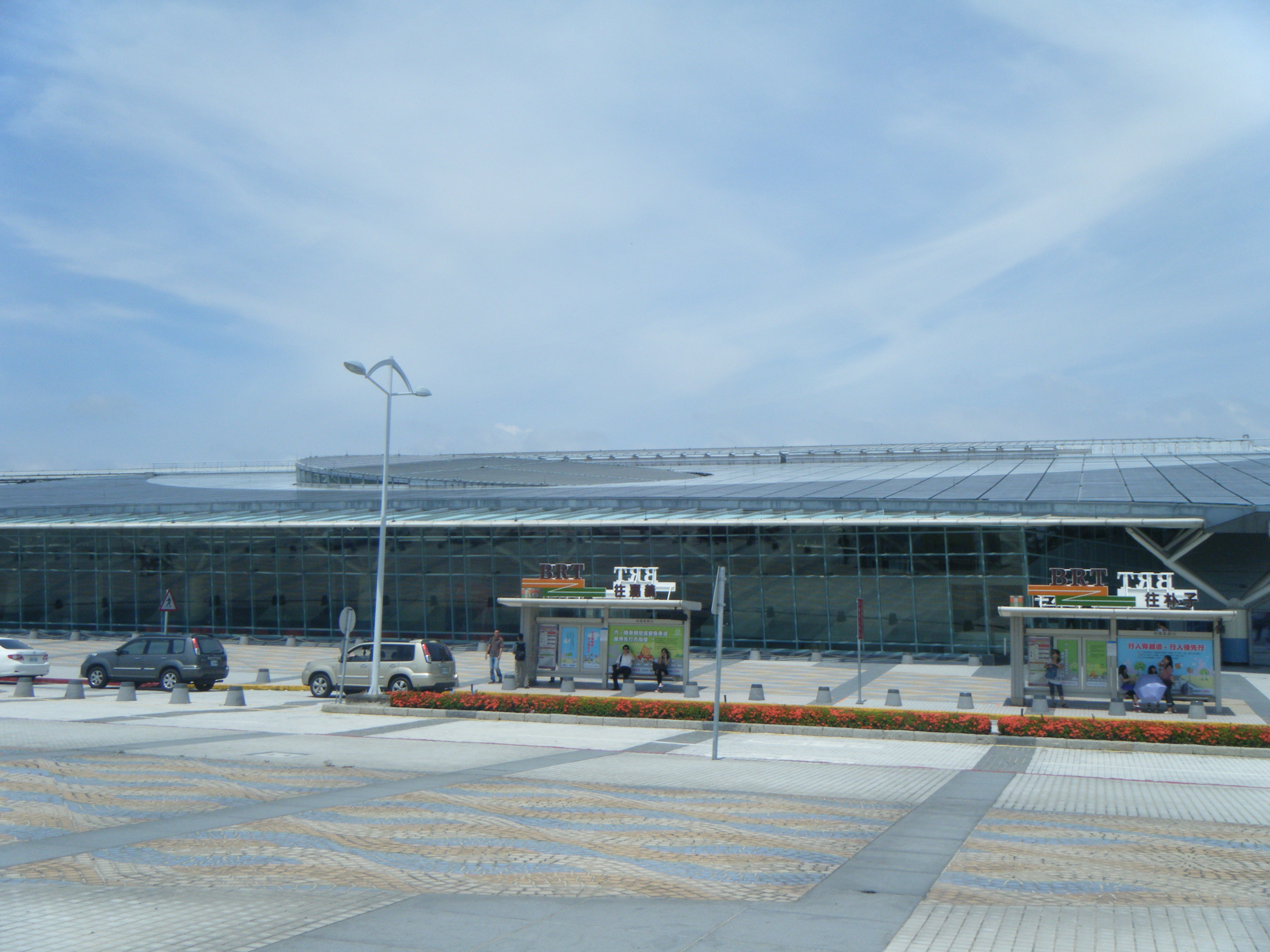
- Station exterior

Chinese name
- Traditional Chinese: 嘉義
Transcriptions
Standard Mandarin
- Hanyu Pinyin: Jiāyì
- Bopomofo: ㄐㄧㄚ ㄧˋ
- Wade–Giles: Chia¹-i⁴
Hakka
- Romanization: Gá-ngi (Sixian dialect); Gà-ngi^{+} (Hailu dialect)
Southern Min
- Tâi-lô: Ka-gī

General information
- Location: 168 Gaotie W Rd; Taibao, Chiayi County; Taiwan
- Coordinates: 23.4595°N 120.3233°E
- System: THSR railway station
- Line: THSR
- Distance: 251.4 km
- Connections: Bus rapid transit; Coach

Construction
- Structure type: Elevated

Other information
- Station code: CHY／10
- Website: en.thsrc.com.tw/ArticleContent/1a39d0e0-a5d0-4b92-a90b-7e94ab840b1d

History
- Opened: 2007-01-05

Passengers
- 2018: 5.613 million per year ▲6%
- Rank: 8 out of 12

Services
Preceding station	Taiwan High Speed Rail	Following station
Yunlin towards Nangang	THSR	Tainan towards Zuoying
Location
- Location within Taiwan

Chiayi (Chinese: 嘉義; pinyin: Jiāyì) is a high-speed rail station in Taibao City, Chiayi County, Taiwan served by Taiwan High Speed Rail.

== Overview ==
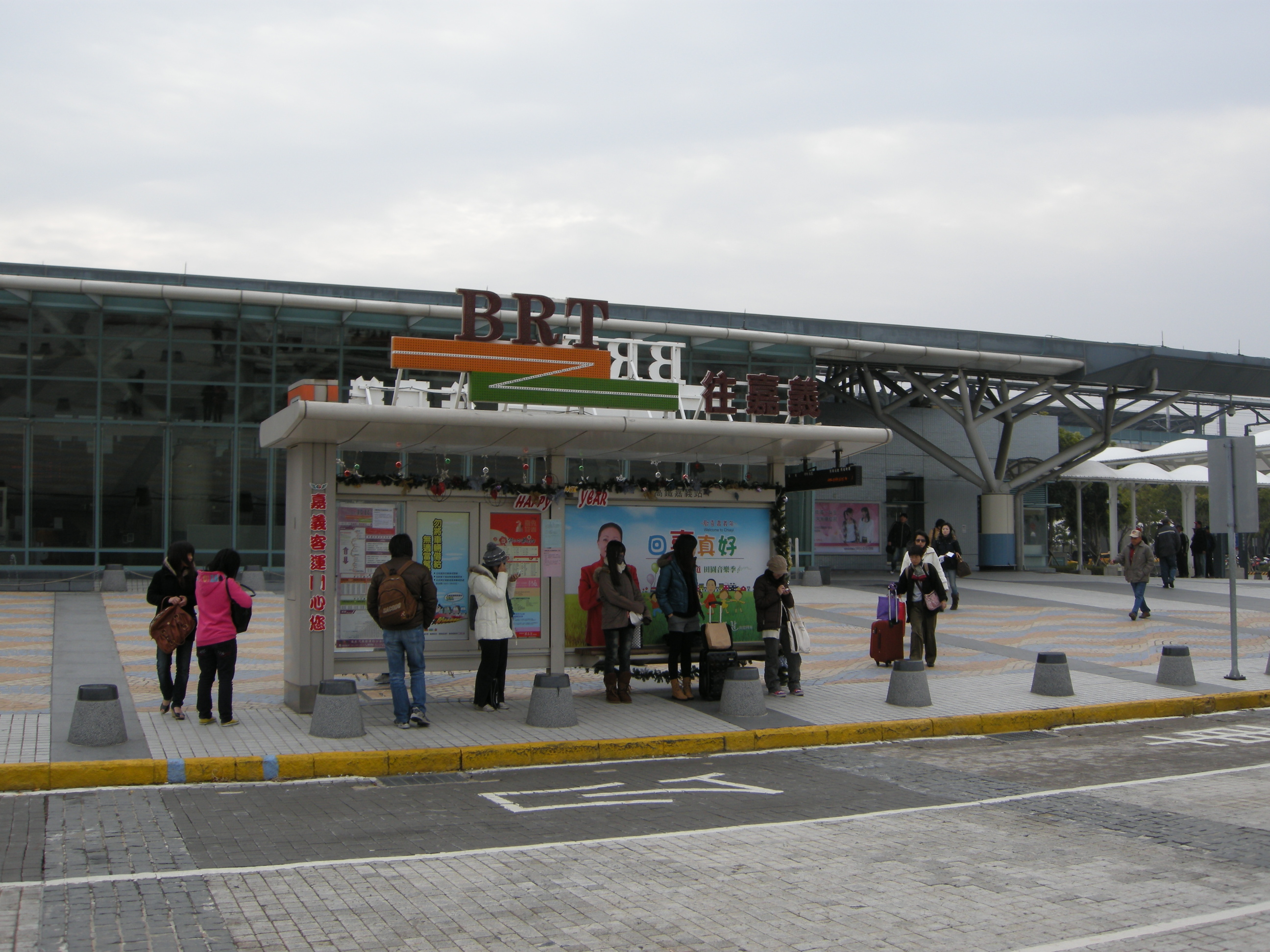
Chiayi BRT stand in front of the station

The station is elevated, with two side platforms which are connected by an overhead skyway. The station was designed by Fei & Cheng Associates and constructed primarily by Takenaka Corporation. The roof of the station building and the platform are horizontally connected, and an oval-shaped skylight is installed in the center of the station hall. The total floor area is 21,551 m^{3} (761,100 ft^{3}). The building is constructed from steel and reinforced concrete.

== History ==
=== THSR ===
- 2006-11-03: The station opened for service.
- 2007-01-05: The segment from Banqiao to Zuoying opened for service. Trains began stopping at the station.

=== Bus rapid transit ===
- 2007-01-05: A temporary bus rapid transit (BRT) line linking the station began service.
- 2008-01-31: Chiayi Bus Rapid Transit (BRT) formally opened for service.

== Station layout ==
3F
3F	Side platform
3F	Platform 1	THSR toward Nangang (Yunlin)
3F	Platform 2	THSR toward Zuoying (Tainan)
3F	Side platform

2F	Connecting level	Faregates, waiting area, nursery

Street level	Concourse	Entrance/exit, ticketing, automatic ticket machines, restrooms, information desk Tourism counter, retail stores Parking lot, transfers, taxi stand, drop-off area

== HSR services ==
HSR services 203, 295, 1202, (1)3xx, 583, 598, (1)6xx, and 8xx call at this station.

== Around the station ==
- Chang Gung University of Science and Technology
- Ping Huang Coffee Museum
- Southern Branch of the National Palace Museum
- Zhecheng Cultural Park
- Chiayi County Special Zone
- Chiayi County Government
- Suantou Village (Liujiao administrative center)
- Chiayi County Baseball Stadium
- Chang Gung Memorial Hospital, Chiayi Branch
- National Taiwan College of Physical Education, Chiayi Campus
