= Taibao =

County-administered city in Chiayi County, Taiwan

Taibao 太保市 Taiho
- County-administered city
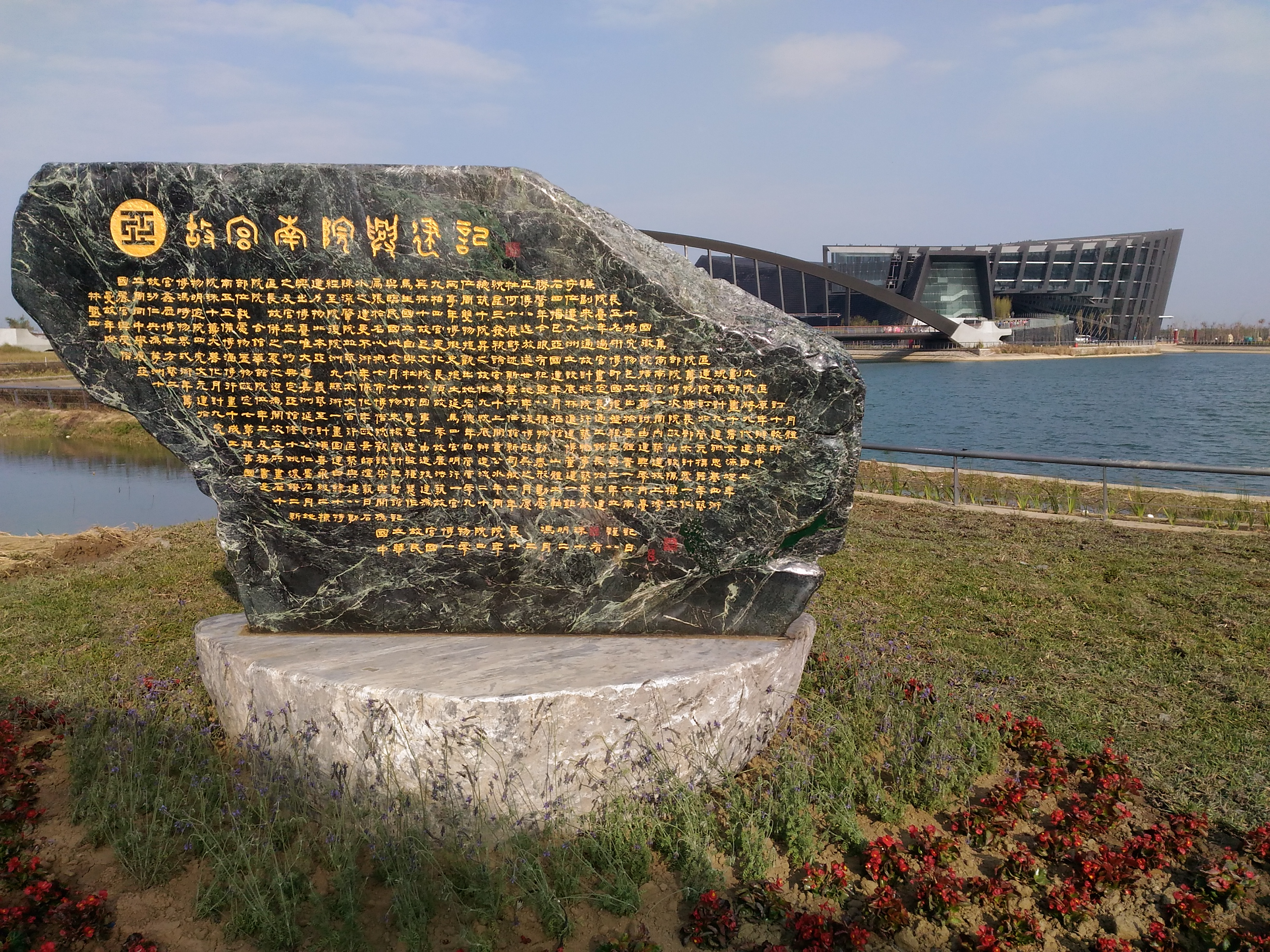
- National Palace Museum Southern Branch

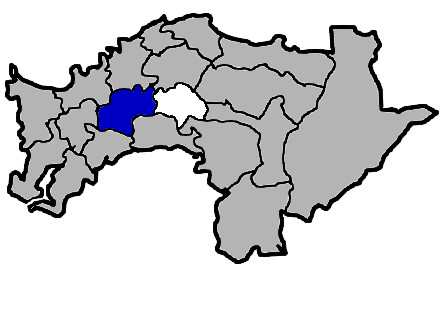
- Coordinates: 23.45°N 120.3333°E
- Country: Republic of China (Taiwan)
- Province: Taiwan
- County: Chiayi

Government
  - Supervisor: Tung Kuo-cheng

Area
  - Total: 66.90 km^{2} (25.83 sq mi)

Population (May 2022)
  - Total: 38,696
  - Density: 578.4/km^{2} (1,498/sq mi)

Taibao City
- Chinese: 太保市
Transcriptions
Standard Mandarin
- Hanyu Pinyin: Tàibǎo Shì
- Bopomofo: ㄊㄞˋ ㄅㄠˇ ㄕˋ
- Gwoyeu Romatzyh: Taybao Shyh
- Wade–Giles: Tʻai⁴-pao³ Shih⁴
- Tongyong Pinyin: Tàibǎo Shìh
- MPS2: Tàibǎu Shr̀
- IPA: [tʰâɪ.pàʊ ʂɻ̩̂]
Hakka
- Pha̍k-fa-sṳ: Thai-pó-sṳ
Southern Min
- Hokkien POJ: Thài-pó-chhī
- Tâi-lô: Thài-pó-tshī

Taibao (Hokkien POJ: Thài-pó) is a county-administered city and the county seat of Chiayi County, Taiwan.

== Name ==
The city was named after the government position of Wang De-lu, whose hometown is Taibao, in the 19th century.

== History ==
Formerly Tsing-kau-boe (Chinese: 前溝尾; Pe̍h-ōe-jī: Chêng-kau-bóe).

Taibao City was established as Taibao Township in August 1945 after the World War II. In August 1946, Taibao Township was incorporated to Chiayi City to become Taibao District. In September 1950, it became a rural township named Taibao Township under Chiayi County administration. In July 1991, it became a county-administered city called Taibao City.

== Administrative divisions ==
The city has 18 villages, which are Beixin, Nanxin, Bixiang, Maliao, Guogou, Gangwei, Tianwei, Jiubi, Xinpi, Qiantan, Houtan, Meipu, Houzhuang, Taibao, Dongshi, Lunding, Chunzhu and Anren Village.

== Government institutions ==
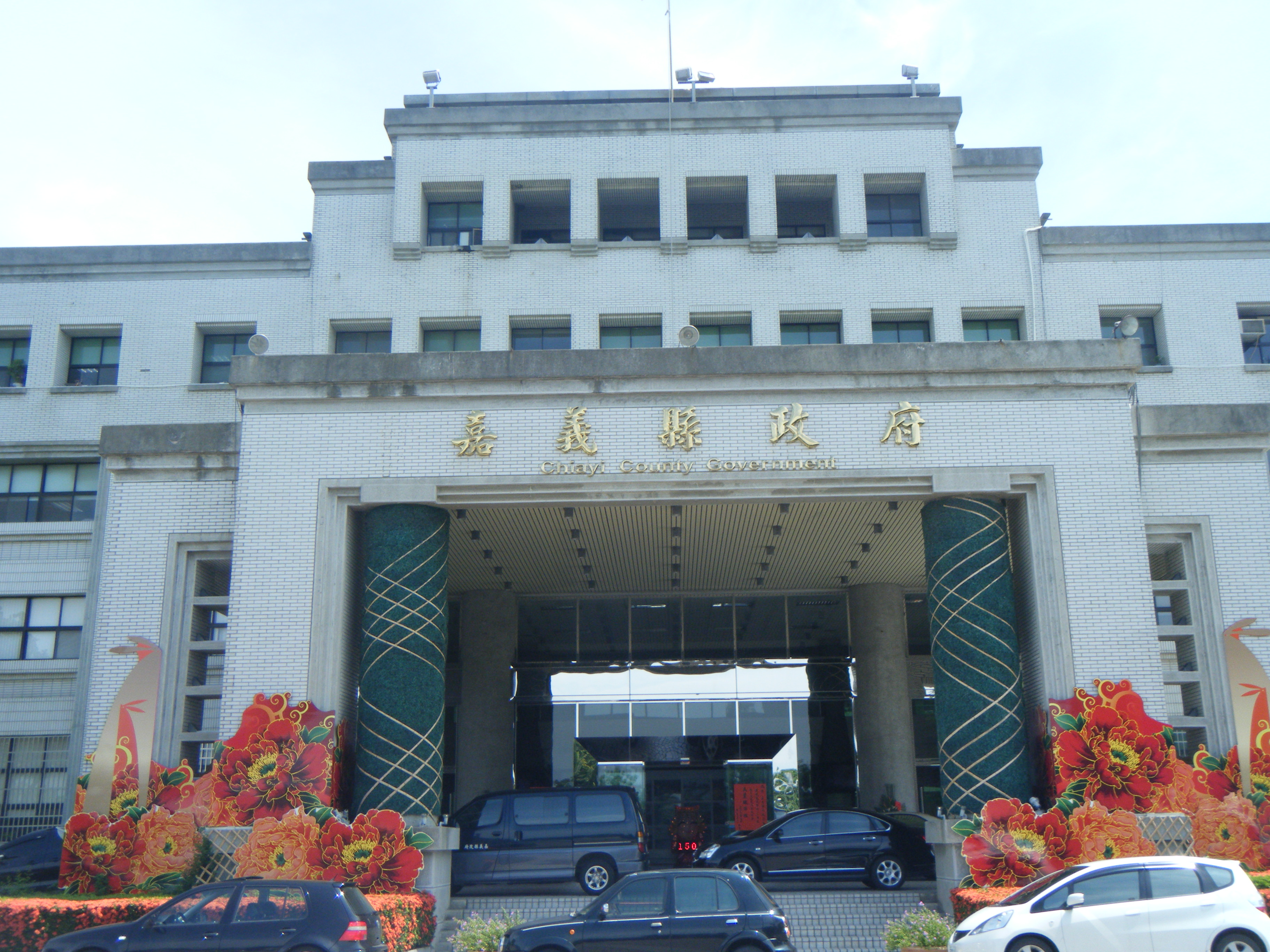
Chiayi County Hall

- Chiayi County Government

== Education ==
- Tatung Institute of Commerce and Technology

== Tourist attractions ==
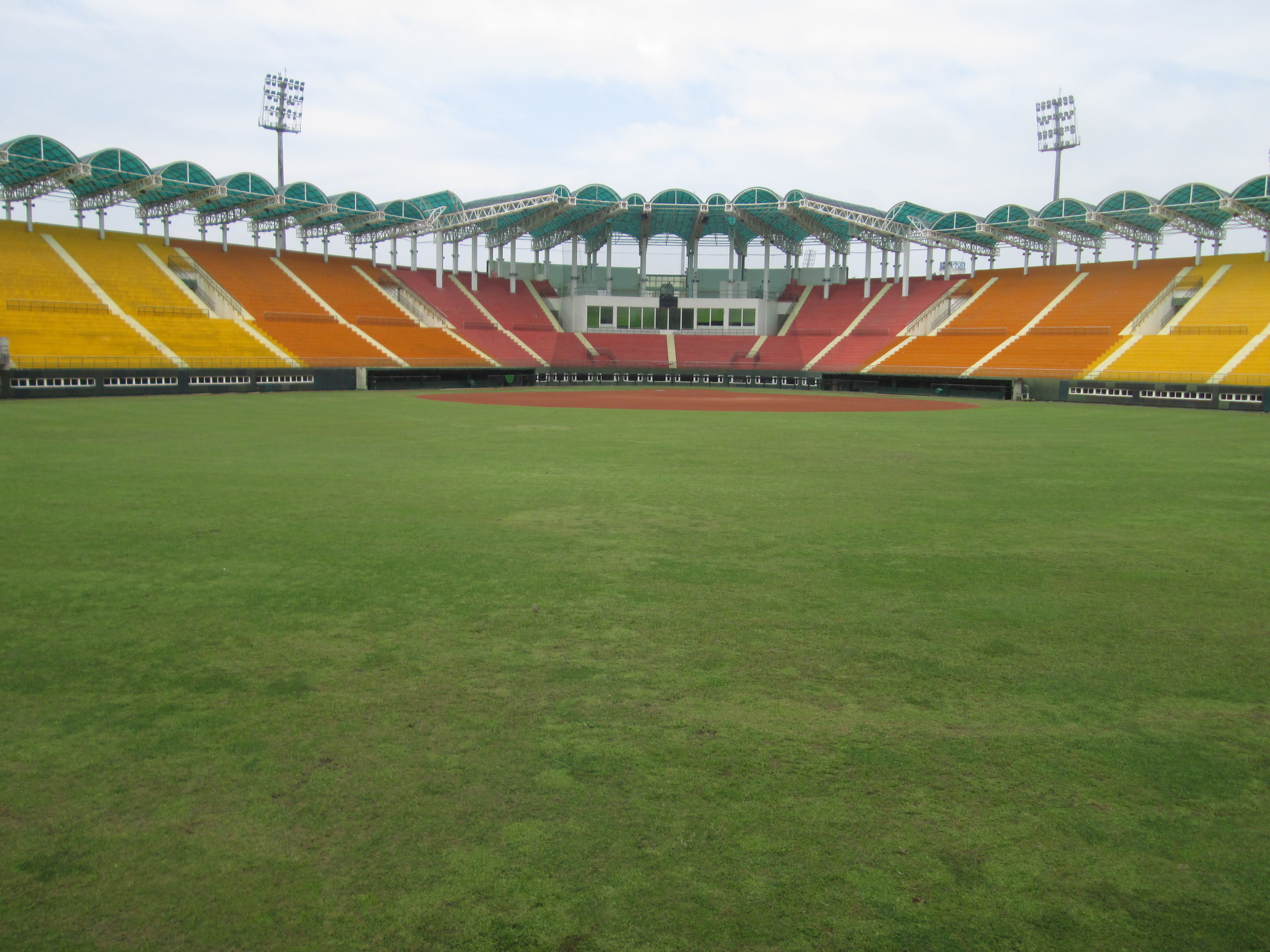
Chiayi County Baseball Stadium

- Chiayi County Baseball Stadium and Chiayi County Track Stadium
- National Palace Museum Southern Branch
- Ox General Temple
- Ping Huang Coffee Museum
- Wangshihjia Temple

== Transportation ==
=== Rail ===
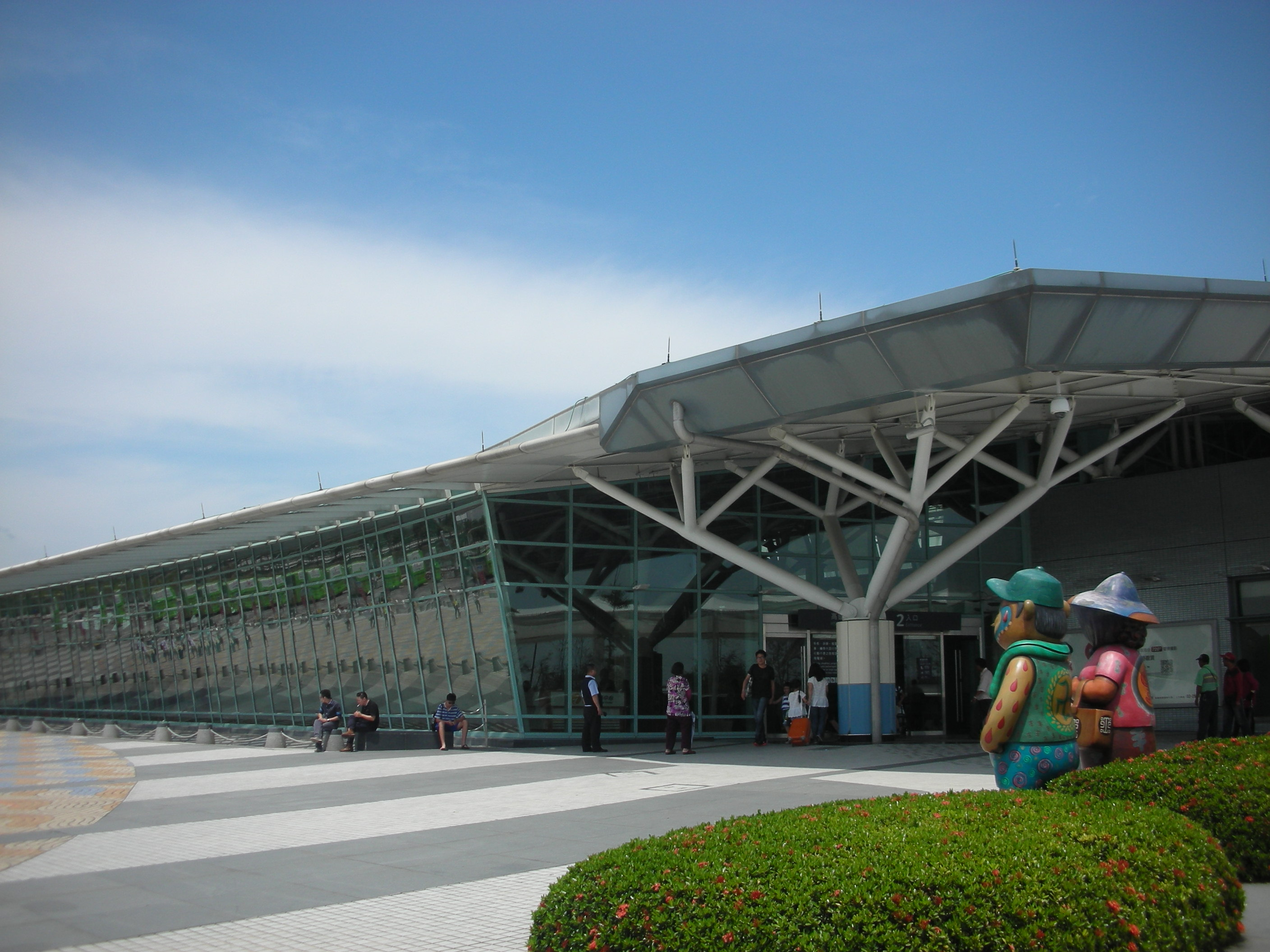
THSR Chiayi Station in Taibao

The city is served by Chiayi Station of the Taiwan High Speed Rail.

=== Bus ===
Chiayi Bus Rapid Transit connects the city with neighboring Chiayi City.

== Notable natives ==
- Wang De-lu, Qing dynasty general
- Yeh Hsien-hsiu, politician and singer
