= Ping Huang Coffee Museum =

Museum in Taibao, Chiayi County, Taiwan

- 品皇咖啡博物館
- Location: Taibao, Chiayi County, Taiwan
- Coordinates: 23°25′32″N 120°20′37″E
- Type: museum
- Website: Official website

The Ping Huang Coffee Museum (traditional Chinese: 品皇咖啡博物館; simplified Chinese: 品皇咖啡博物馆; pinyin: Pǐnhuáng Kāfēi Bówùguǎn) is a museum about coffee in Taibao City, Chiayi County, Taiwan.

== Architecture ==
The museum spreads over two floors. The ground floor consists of the coffee knowledge area, Golden Mandeling avenue, tasting area and sales area. The upper floor consists of reserved guided area.

== Activities ==
The museum features hands-on activities such as coffee making. It also provides information tours to visitors on the process of coffee making.

== Transportation ==
The museum is accessible within walking distance southeast from Chiayi Station of the Taiwan High Speed Rail.

== See also ==
- Bramah Tea and Coffee Museum
- Dubai Coffee Museum
- The World Coffee Museum
- List of museums in Taiwan
- List of food and beverage museums
