= Sun-Shooting Tower =

Tower in East, Chiayi City, Taiwan

- 射日塔
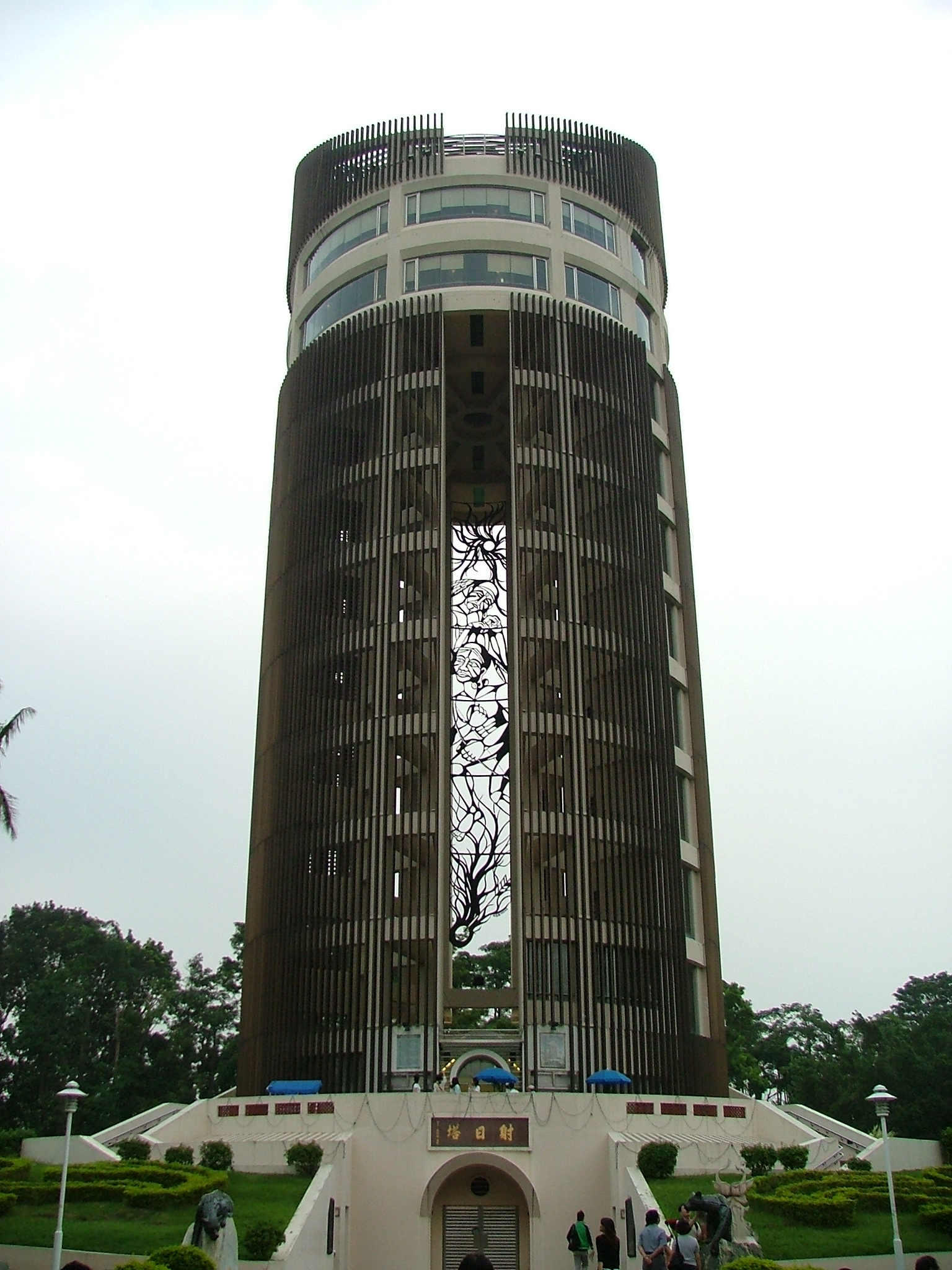
- Interactive map of the Sun-Shooting Tower area

General information
- Type: Tower
- Architectural style: Alishan tree
- Location: East, Chiayi City, Taiwan
- Coordinates: 23°28′52″N 120°28′10″E
- Opened: 1998

Height
- Height: 62 m (203 ft)

The Sun-Shooting Tower (Chinese: 射日塔; pinyin: Shèrì Tǎ) or Chiayi Tower is a tower built inside Chiayi Park, East District, Chiayi City, Taiwan.

== Architecture ==
The tower stands at a height of 62 meters. Its exterior designed was inspired by a giant sacred tree in Alishan. The brown aluminum pattern mimics the wood grain of the tree and the center is left with a 40-meter-high (130 ft) empty space that mimics the crack in the center of that giant sacred tree.

The interior bronze sculpture is inspired by the "Sun-Shooting" legend of Taiwanese indigenous peoples. This bronze-made sculpture is 24 meters tall and 3 meters wide.

The tower features an observation deck, a café and a small rooftop garden.

== Transportation ==
The tower is accessible within walking distance southeast from Beimen Station of the Alishan Forest Railway or using Chiayi County Bus from Chiayi Station of Taiwan Railway.

== See also ==
- Kagi Shrine
- Chiayi Park
