= Southern Branch of the National Palace Museum =

Museum in Taibao, Chiayi County, Taiwan

- 國立故宮博物院南部院區
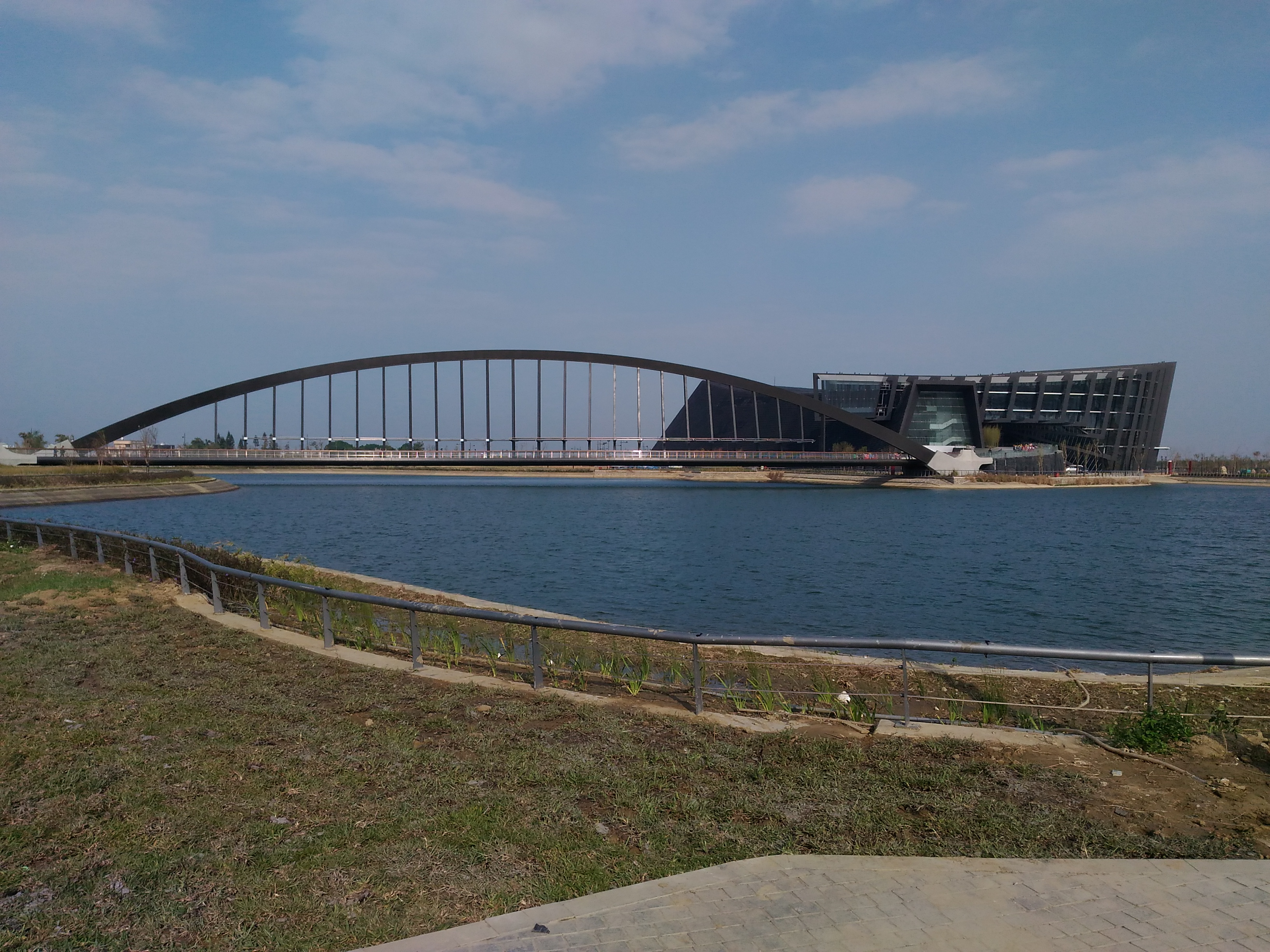
- Established: 28 December 2015
- Location: Taibao, Chiayi County, Taiwan
- Coordinates: 23°28′24.8″N 120°17′32.2″E
- Type: museum
- Visitors: 970,000 (2017)
- Architect: Kris Yao
- Website: Official website

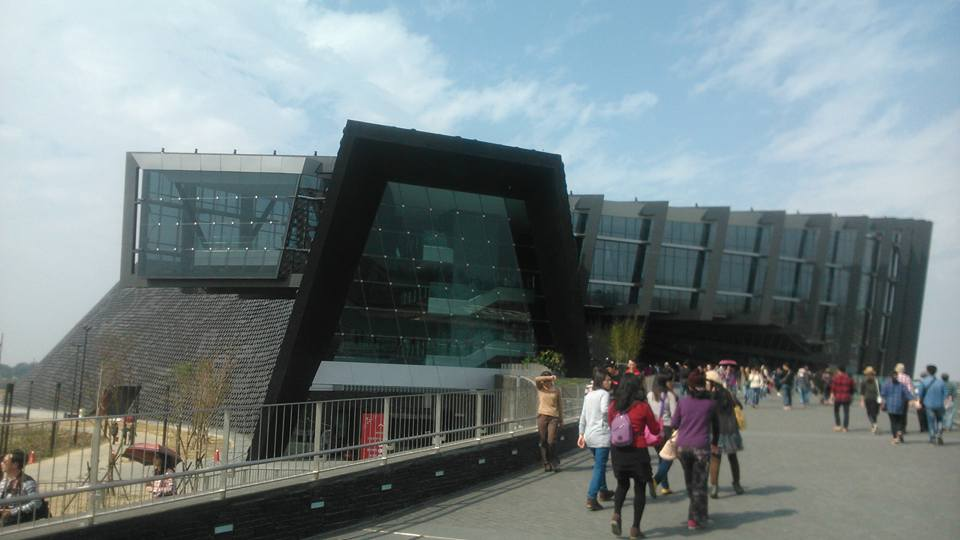
Entrance to Southern Branch of the National Palace Museum

The Southern Branch of the National Palace Museum (NPMSB; traditional Chinese: 國立故宮博物院南部院區; simplified Chinese: 国立故宫博物院南部院区; pinyin: Guólì Gùgōng Bówùyuàn Nánbù Yuànqū) is a museum in Taibao City, Chiayi County, Taiwan.

== History ==
To improve the cultural equity between Northern Taiwan and Southern Taiwan, the Executive Yuan approved the construction of the southern branch of National Palace Museum on 31 December 2004 as the Asian Arts and Culture Museum. The museum main building groundbreaking ceremony was held on 6 February 2013 hosted by President Ma Ying-jeou and the beam-raising ceremony was held on 5 June 2014 hosted by Vice President Wu Den-yih. The museum was opened for trial on 28 December 2015. In mid April 2016, the museum was closed due to reparation work of water leakage in its main hall building. The museum was then reopened on 23 August 2016.

== Architecture ==
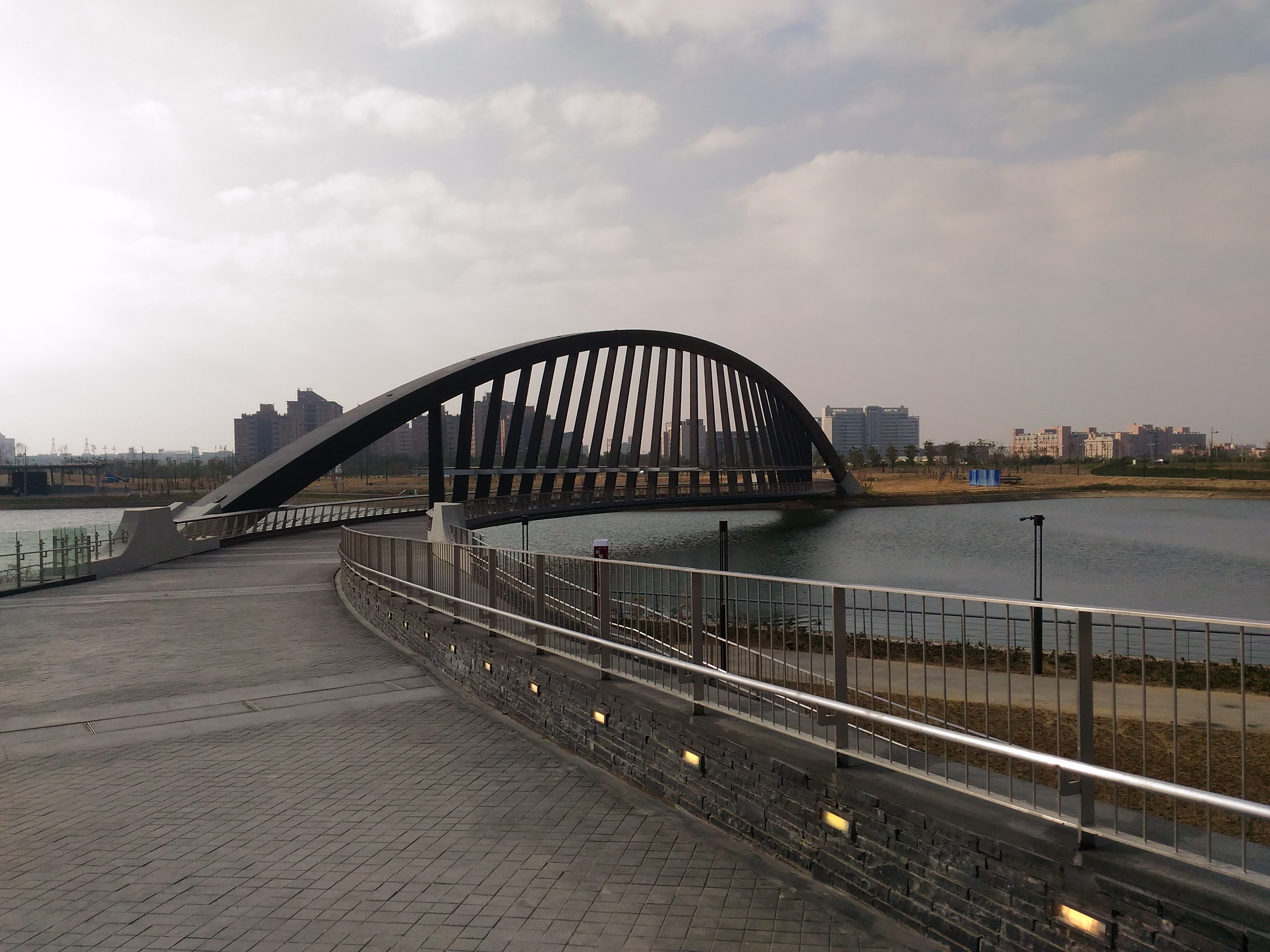
Zhimei Bridge

The 70-hectare museum was constructed at a cost of NT$7.934 billion. It consists of the main building, landscape bridge and park view. The main contractor for the construction was Lee Ming Construction for the main building and Progressive Environment Inc. Co. for the park.

The museum's main building spreads over an area of 20 hectares. The building's shape was designed to invoke the three classical brush forms of ink painting. It consists of the Moyun Hall and Feibai Hall. The three shapes of brush also represents three ancient Asian civilization, which are China, India and Persia. The main entrance to the building ground floor has an elevation of 11 meters. It is also a certified green building.

The landscape bridge, named Zhimei Bridge, spans across a lake for a length of 142 metres (466 ft). It is a single span steel arch bridge. It consists of 25 curved ribs with various lengths and angles.

The museum park spans over an area of 50 hectares. It consists of the Waterscape Garden, Tropical Garden and Festival Garden. It also features a bird-viewing platform, memorial stone for the museum establishment, waterfront stage etc.

== Exhibitions ==
The museum consists of permanent exhibition and temporary exhibition sections. Exhibits are sorted in to the rooms National Treasures, Asian Textiles, Search for Decorative Patterns(pottery). It also includes the children's creative center.

In 2025 an exhibit was opened featuring artifacts from the Mongol Yuan Dynasty which centered on Kublai Khan.

== Events ==
- Indian Festival of Light
- Muslim Culture Day

== Facilities ==
Opened on 21 December 2017, the museum opened a Muslim prayer room, the first of such opening in a Taiwanese museum.

== Transportation ==
The museum is accessible by bus (including Chiayi BRT Route 7212) from Chiayi Station of Taiwan High Speed Rail.

Shuttles also run between the museum parking lots and the main building.

== See also ==
- List of museums in Taiwan
