= Chiayi Confucian Temple =

Chinese temple in East, Chiayi City, Taiwan

- 嘉義孔子廟
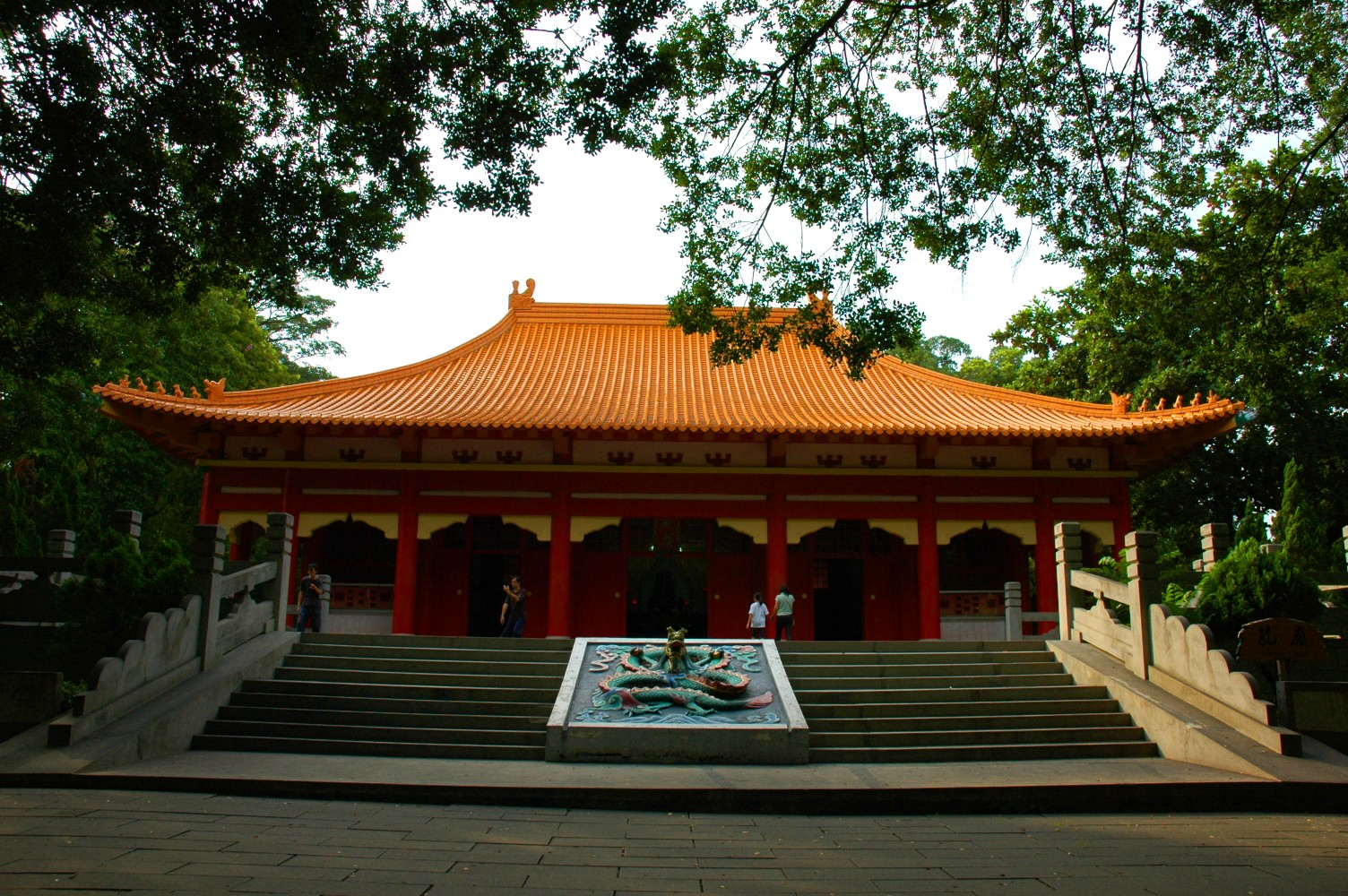

- Location within Chiayi City

Religion
- Affiliation: Confucian

Location
- Location: East, Chiayi City, Taiwan
- Interactive map of Chiayi Confucian Temple
- Coordinates: 23°28′56.2″N 120°27′59.3″E

Architecture
- Type: temple of Confucius
- Completed: 1706

The Chiayi Confucian Temple (traditional Chinese: 嘉義孔子廟; simplified Chinese: 嘉义孔子庙; pinyin: Jiāyì Kǒngzǐ Miào) is a Confucian temple in Chiayi Park, East District, Chiayi City, Taiwan.

== History ==
The temple was originally built in 1706. In 1815, the temple restoration stele was inscribed and erected. In 1907, an earthquake occurred in the city and the Confucian Tablet was moved to Wenchang Hall and later re-housed at Nanmen Shengshen Temple. In 1961, the Confucian Temple was rebuilt inside Chiayi Park and the Temple Restoration Stele was re-erected in the garden of the new temple. In 1964, the new Confucian Temple was completed and the Confucian Tablet was returned to Dacheng Hall.

== Transportation ==
The temple is accessible within walking distance south east of Beimen Station of the Alishan Forest Railway.

== See also ==
- Chiayi Cheng Huang Temple
- Chiayi Jen Wu Temple
- Temple of Confucius
- List of temples in Taiwan
