= Wang Delu =

Chinese politician, general (1823–1901)

Viscount of the Second Rank Wang Delu
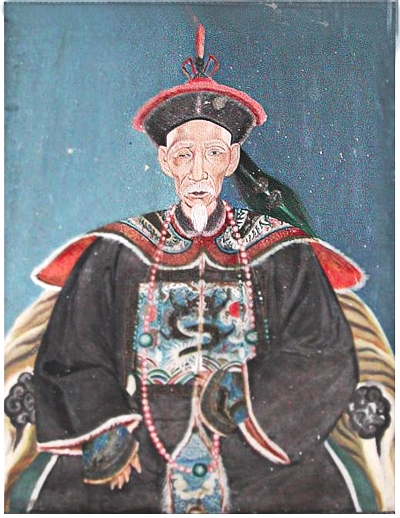

Commander of Zhejiang Province(浙江提督)

Personal details
- Born: January 19, 1770 Zhuluo County, Taiwan Prefecture, Fujian Province, Qing Empire
- Died: September 5, 1842 (aged 72) Penghu(Pescadores Islands), Taiwan Prefecture, Fujian Province, Qing Empire
- Resting place: Chiayi County, Taiwan
- Occupation: general

Military service
- Allegiance: Qing Dynasty
- Branch/service: Qing Army
- Rank: General

Wang Delu (Chinese: 王得祿; pinyin: Wáng Delù; 1772–1843) was a general during the Qing dynasty. He was born in what is now Taibao City, Chiayi County, Taiwan.

He enlisted as a soldier aged 15, and later led China's navy. He died of natural causes during the First Opium War.

Because of his success as a soldier, he was ennobled by the imperial court, which also donated money for a lavish funeral and a huge tomb—the largest extant in Taiwan.
