= Chiayi Bus Rapid Transit =

Bus service in Taiwan

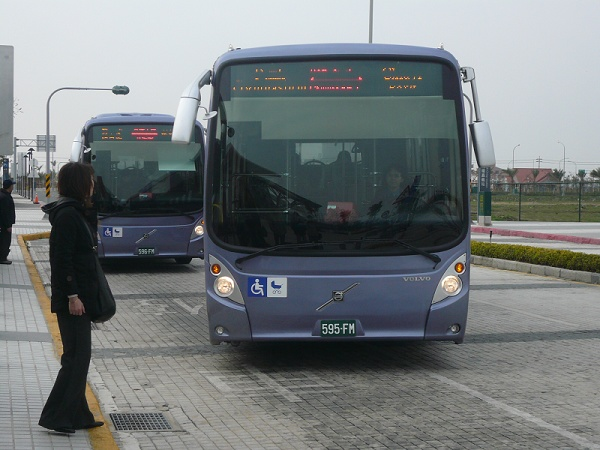
- A Chiayi BRT bus pulling in to a stop
- Founded: 2008
- Service area: Chiayi County and Chiayi City, Taiwan
- Destinations: Chiayi High Speed Rail Station; Chiayi TRA Station
- Operator: Chiayi Bus Company
- Website: www.cibus.com.tw

Chiayi BRT route map

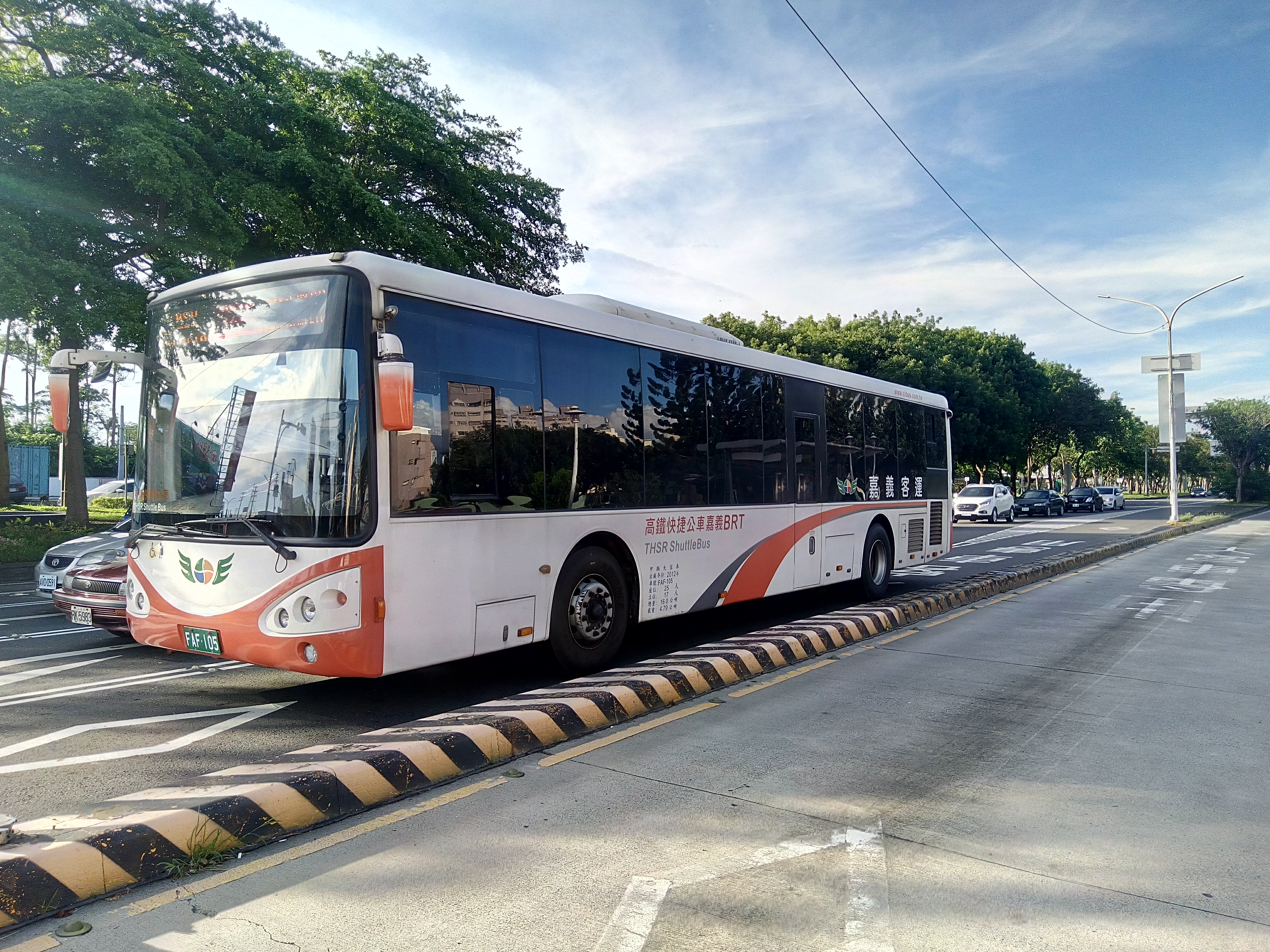
Chiayi BRT Sunwin nonstep Bus at Shihhsien-BeiKang station

Chiayi Bus Rapid Transit (Chiayi BRT; Chinese: 嘉義公車捷運; pinyin: Jiāyì Gōngchē Jiéyùn) is a limited-stop express bus service operating in Taiwan, linking Chiayi High Speed Rail Station in Taibao City, Chiayi County and downtown Chiayi City. It uses exclusive bus lanes and GPS-controlled traffic lights to aid a speedy transfer between stations.

== See also ==
- Taichung BRT
- Transportation in Taiwan
