= Chiayi Cheng Huang Temple =

Temple in East, Chiayi City, Taiwan

- 嘉義城隍廟
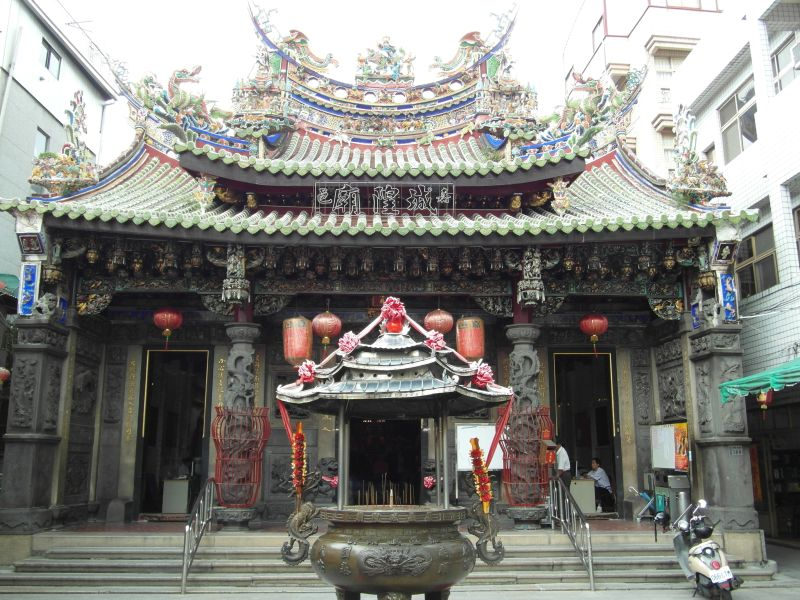

- Location in Chiayi City

Location
- Location: East District, Chiayi City, Taiwan
- Interactive map of Chiayi Cheng Huang Temple
- Coordinates: 23°28′42.2″N 120°27′14.4″E

Architecture
- Type: Temple
- Completed: 1715

Chiayi Cheng Huang Temple (traditional Chinese: 嘉義城隍廟; simplified Chinese: 嘉义城隍庙; pinyin: Jiāyì Chénghuáng Miào) is a Chinese temple dedicated to the City God or Cheng Huang Ye (Chinese: 城隍爺) which is located in East District, Chiayi City, Taiwan. The temple was founded in 1715, it is one of the oldest and prominent temples in the region.

The temple applied for national monument status in 2011, but was not listed at the time. Another application was submitted to the Bureau of Cultural Heritage and approved in April 2015.

The temple offers an educational fund and charity programs. The first cangue processions held at the temple in six decades started in 2014.
