= Cement industry in Taiwan =

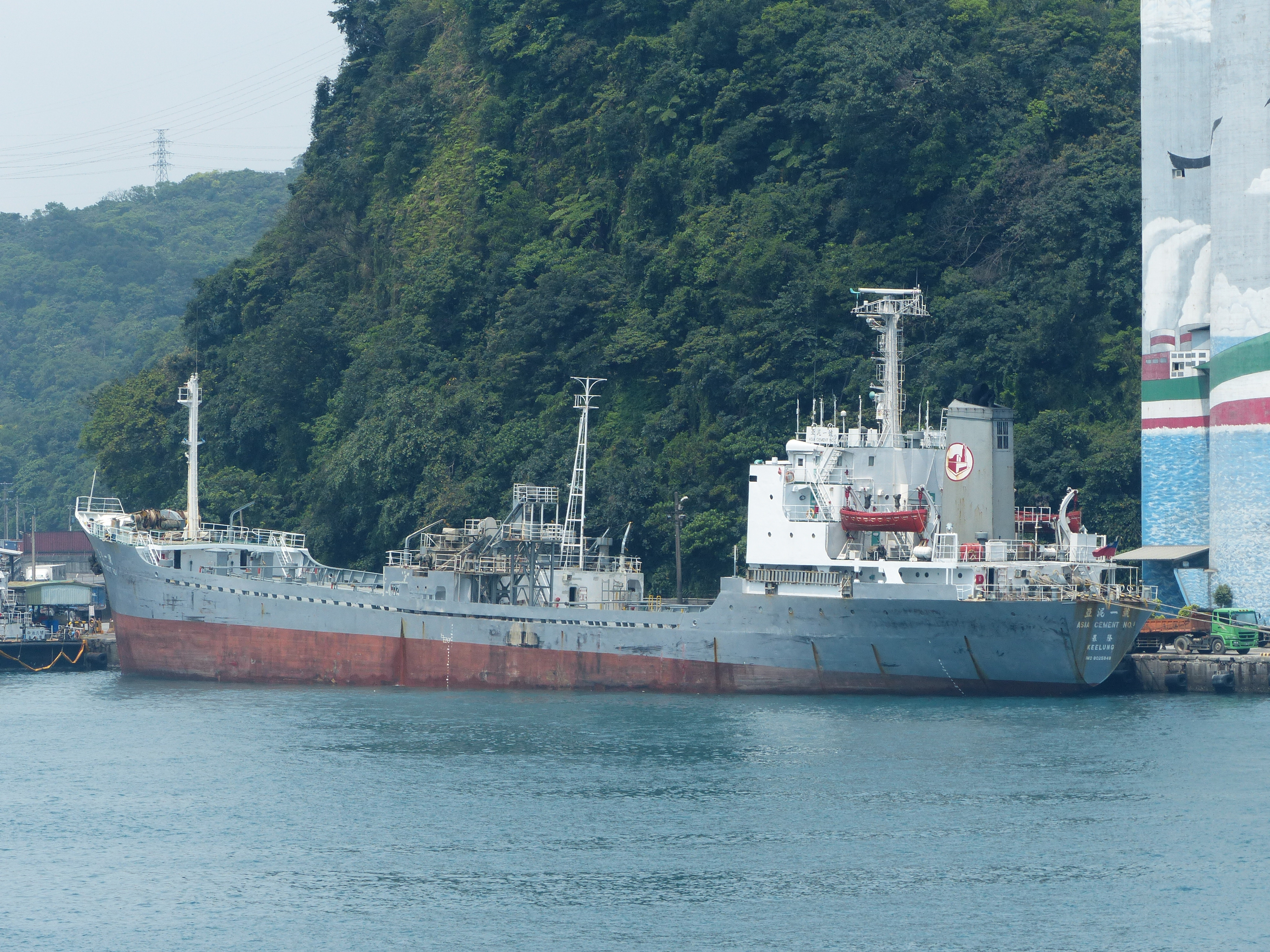
A cement carrier ship in Port of Keelung, Keelung.

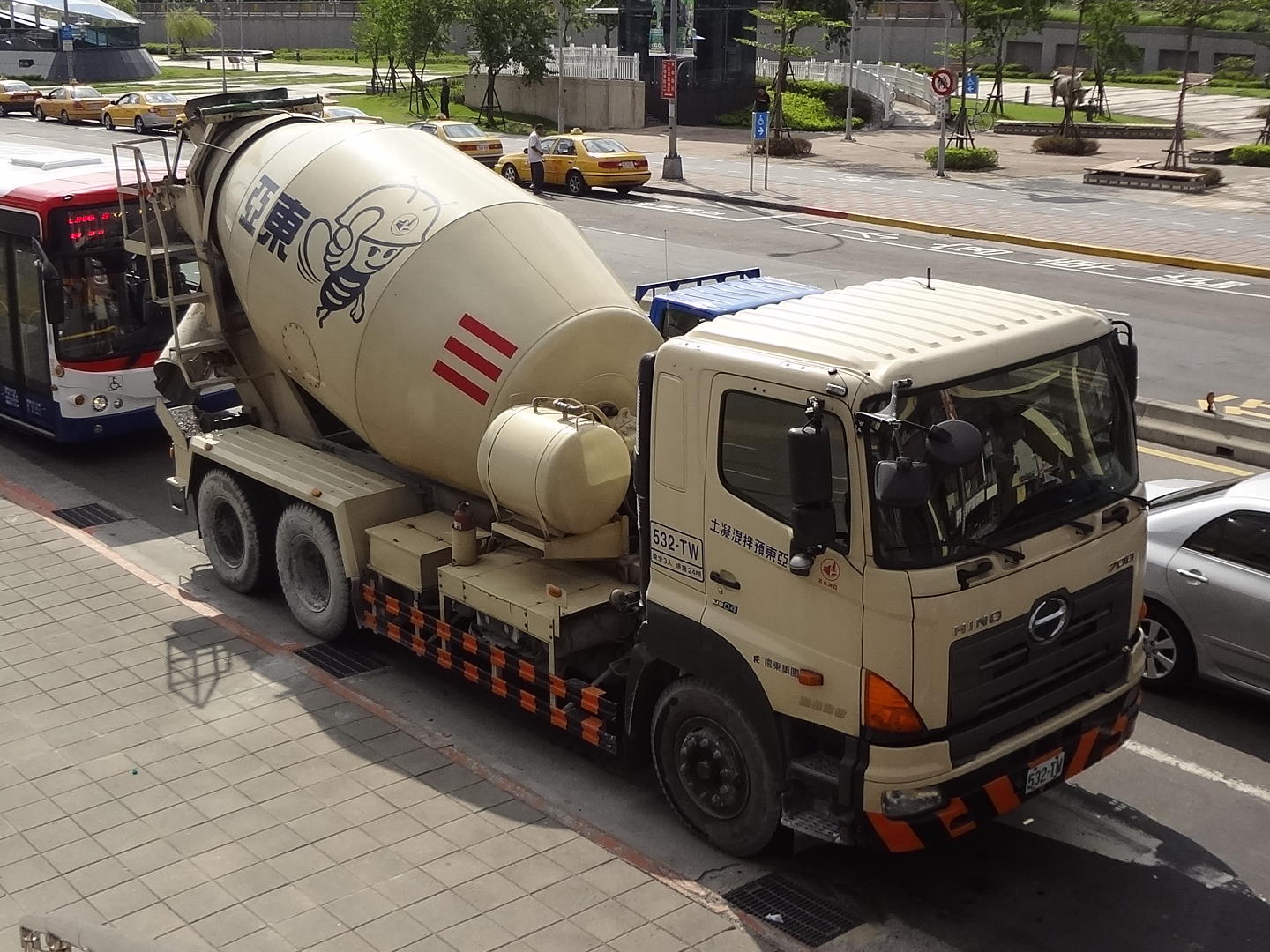
A concrete mixer truck in Taiwan.

Cement industry in Taiwan is the process of extracting cement material for domestic and export use.

== History ==
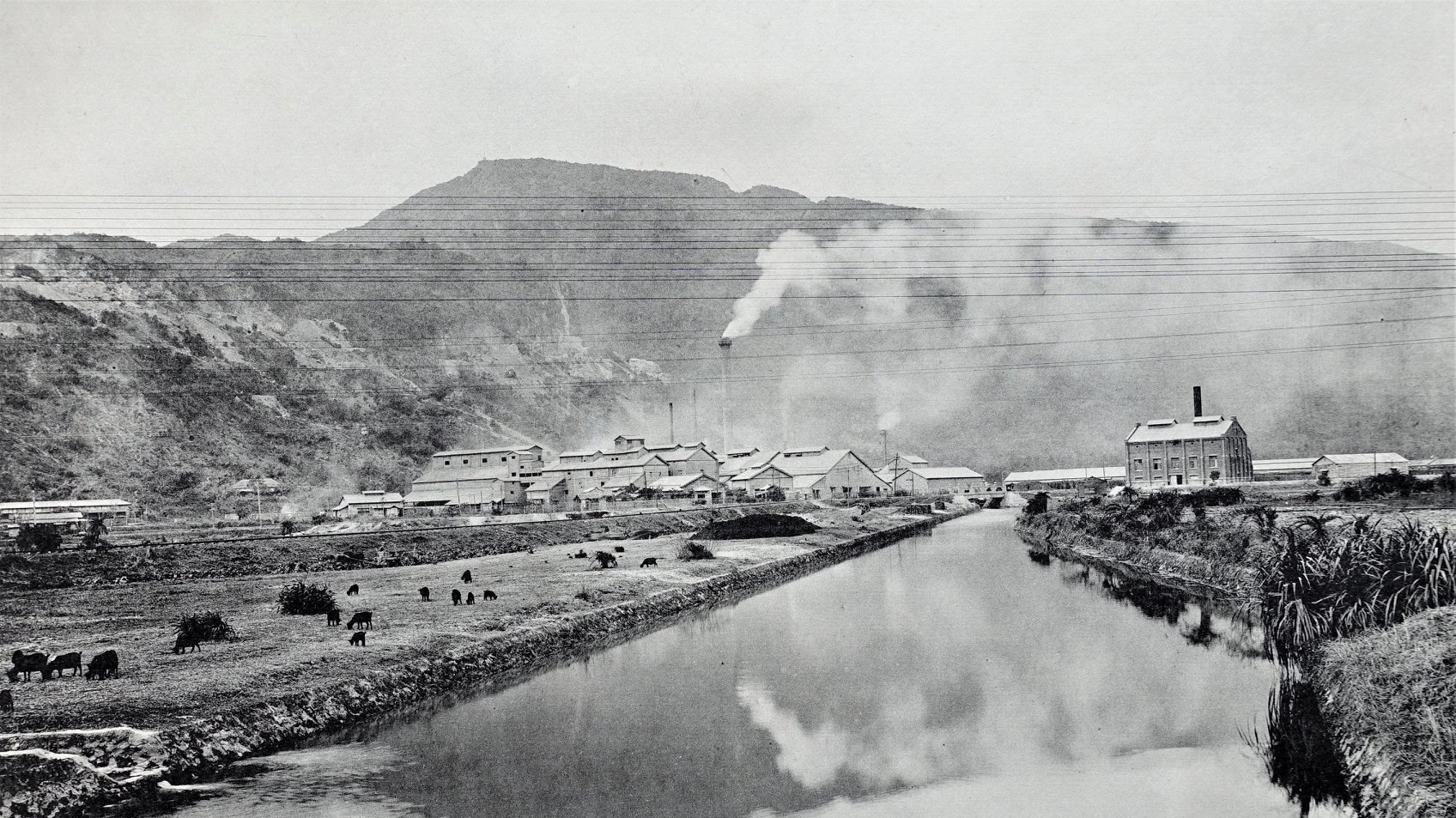
Cement factories in Takao Prefecture during the Japanese rule of Taiwan.

The cement production in Taiwan dated back in 1946 with the establishment of Taiwan Cement.

== Production ==
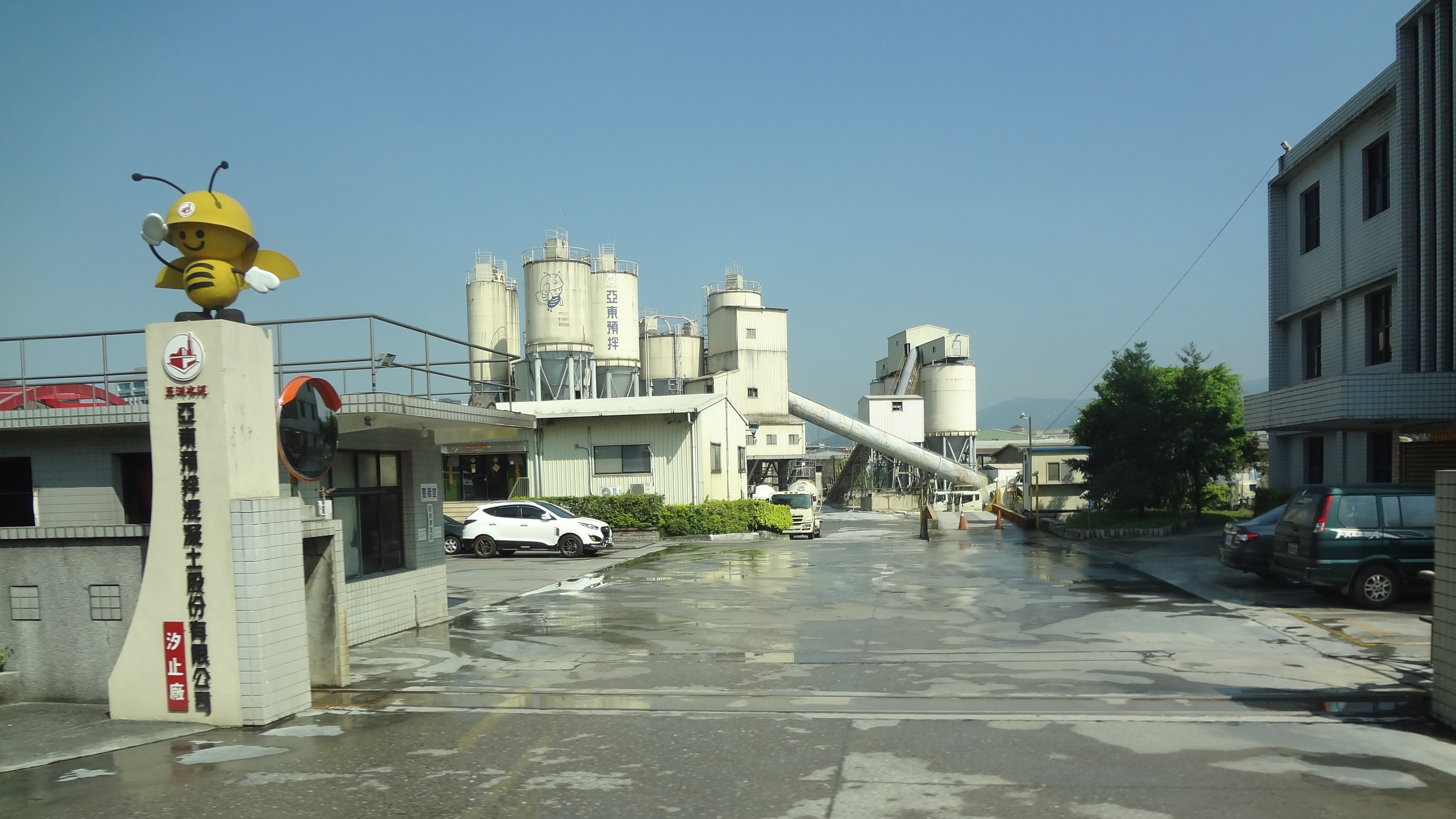
A concrete plant in Xizhi District, New Taipei.

In 1981-2019, the monthly production of cement in Taiwan averaged 1,435,500 tonnes. The peak production occurred in December 1992 with a total production of 2,201,450 tonnes and the lowest production occurred in August 2017 with a total production of 748,640,000 tonnes.

=== Location ===
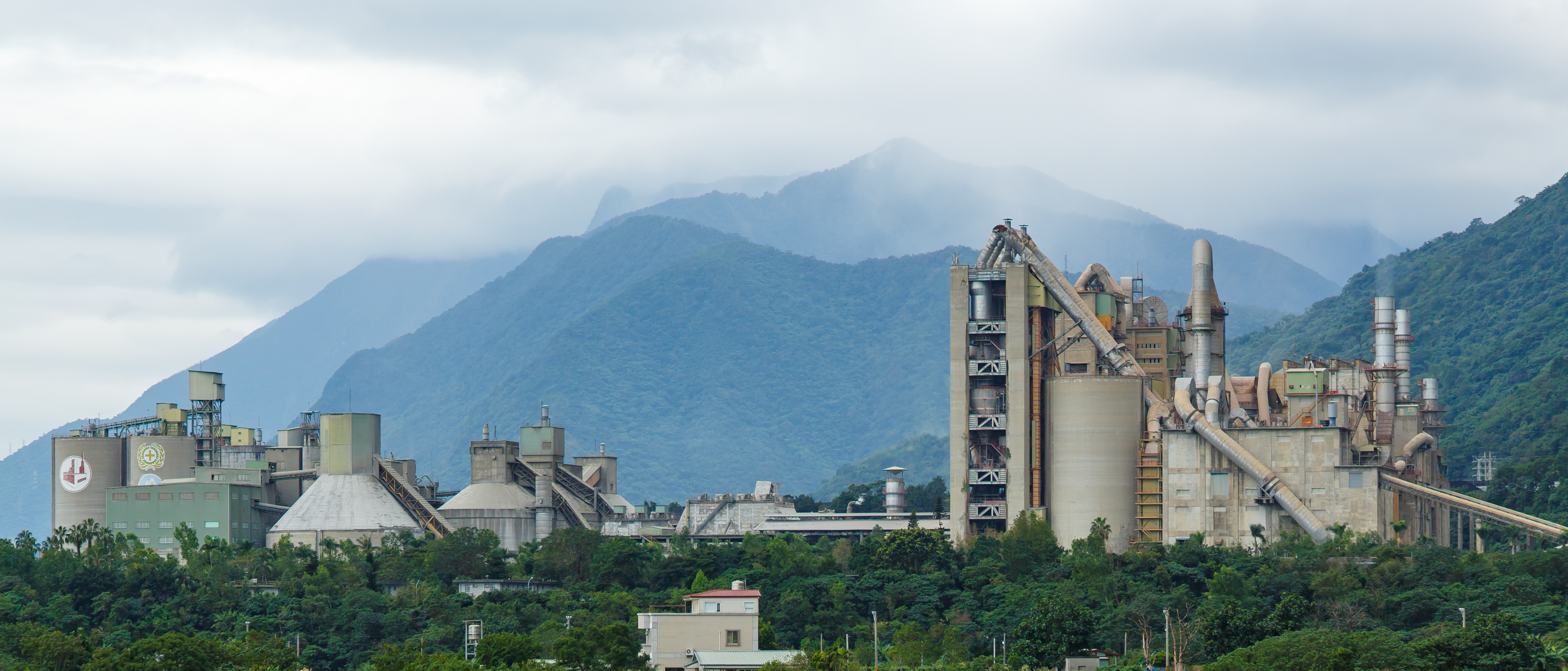
A cement plant owned by Asia Cement in Xincheng Township, Hualien County.

All of cement mines in Taiwan and 80% of cement production facilities are located in the east coast of Taiwan. Asia Cement Corporation has facilities of 5 million tons production capacity in Taiwan and 22 million tons in Mainland China, while Taiwan Cement has 11 million tons in Taiwan and 60 million tons in the mainland.

Cement plants owned by Asia Cement are located in Xincheng Township, Longjing District and Hengshan Township. Cement plants owned by Taiwan Cement are located in Su'ao Township, Xiulin Township and Hualien City.

== Companies ==
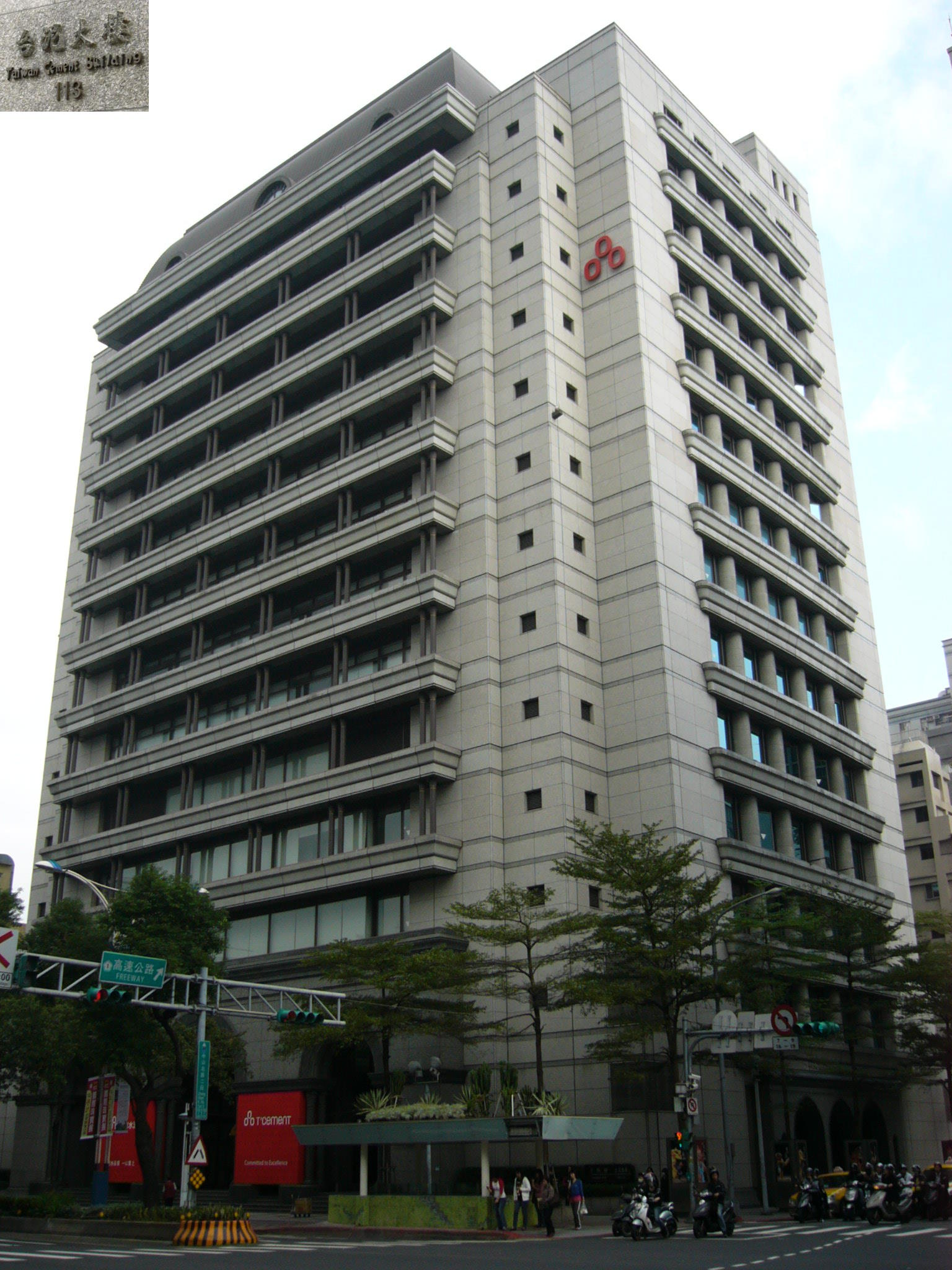
Headquarters office of Taiwan Cement in Zhongshan District, Taipei.

Major cement companies in Taiwan are:

- Asia Cement Corporation
- Taiwan Cement
- Chia Hsin Cement Corporation (Chinese: 嘉新水泥股份有限公司)
- Hsing Ta Cement Corporation (Chinese: 信大水泥股份有限公司)

== Economy ==
In 2016, Taiwan exported more than 25% of its cement production with lower price and imported 12%.

== Labors ==
Half of employees at Asia Cement Corporation are the indigenous peoples.

== Environmental impacts ==
The environmental impacts of cement production in Taiwan include landscape changes and deforestation, and greenhouse gas emissions due to the energy-intensive production process.

== See also ==
- Mining in Taiwan
- List of countries by cement production
