= Chiahui Power Corporation =

Independent power producer of Taiwan

- Native name: 嘉惠電力
- Industry: electric power
- Founded: 29 April 1996
- Headquarters: Minxiong, Chiayi County, Taiwan
- Key people: Douglas Tong Hsu (Chairperson)
- Number of employees: 61
- Parent: Far Eastern Group
- Website: Official website (in Chinese)

The Chiahui Power Corporation (traditional Chinese: 嘉惠電力; simplified Chinese: 嘉惠电力; pinyin: Jiāhuì Diànlì) is an independent power producer company in Taiwan.

== History ==
The company was established on 29 April 1996. In 2002, Electric Power Development Company acquired the company's shares from Asia Cement Corporation and invested $75 million in the firm. In September 2020, Asia Cement purchased all shares of the company previously co-owned by Electric Power Development Company for $183 million.

== Power plants ==
- Chiahui Power Plant in Minxiong Township, Chiayi County

== See also ==
- Electricity sector in Taiwan
- List of power stations in Taiwan
