= Chiahui Power Plant =

Power plant in Minxiong, Chiayi County, Taiwan

Chiahui Power Plant 嘉惠電廠
- Country: Republic of China
- Location: Minxiong, Chiayi County, Taiwan
- Coordinates: 23°32′02″N 120°28′31″E
- Status: Operational
- Construction began: January 2002
- Commission date: December 2003 (Unit 1); August 2021 (Unit 2)
- Construction cost: NT$14.4 billion for unit 2
- Operator: Chiahui Power Corporation

Thermal power station
- Primary fuel: Natural gas

Power generation
- Units operational: 2
- Make and model: General Electric
- Nameplate capacity: 1210 MW

External links
- Commons: Related media on Commons

The Chiahui Power Plant (traditional Chinese: 嘉惠電廠; simplified Chinese: 嘉惠电厂; pinyin: Jiāhuì Diànchǎng) is a gas-fired power plant in Songshan Village, Minxiong Township, Chiayi County, Taiwan.

== History ==
The construction of the power plant began in January 2002 and the commissioning of unit 1 of the plant was done in December 2003. The project is the first independent power producer project in Taiwan. In July 2020, the power plant was awarded Occupational Safety and Health Administration Agency's Model Site Award. A second unit was added to the plant beginning in December 2018; it was commissioned in August 2021.

== Ownership ==
Asia Cement Corporation (ACC) and its affiliates owns 59% of equity share, while J-Power owns 40%. The remaining 1% share is owned by other private shareholders. In September 2020 J-Power sold all its shares to ACC.

== Generation units ==
The power plant has a total installed generation capacity of 1210 MW, consisting of two generation units.

Unit 1 has an installed capacity of 670 (or 700) MW. It consists of multiple-shaft combined cycle unit with one steam turbine-generator, three gas turbine generators and three heat recovery steam generators, designed for natural gas firing. The gas turbine generators came from General Electric with F-class technology and was shipped in 2002. Each has 18-stage axial compressor and 3-stage turbine. It also features a cold-end drive and axial exhaust.

Unit 2 has an installed capacity of 510 (or 535) MW.

== Function ==
The power plant is designed for intermediate load operation with daily startup and shutdown to sell power to match the power dispatch schedule of Taipower. The whole generated electricity is sold to Taipower.

== Transportation ==
Chiahui Power Plant is accessible west from Minxiong Station of Taiwan Railway.

== See also ==
- List of power stations in Taiwan
- Electricity sector in Taiwan
