= WFU =

WFU can refer to

- Wake Forest University, a private university in North Carolina
- Water filtration unit, used for water purification
- Westlife Fans United, a fan club for the vocal group Westlife
- Wildland Fire Use, a wildland fire management term
- Woodfree uncoated paper
- WuFeng University in Chiayi County, Taiwan
