= National Chung Cheng University Library =

Academic library in Minxiong, Changhua County, Taiwan

National Chung Cheng University Library 中正大學圖書館
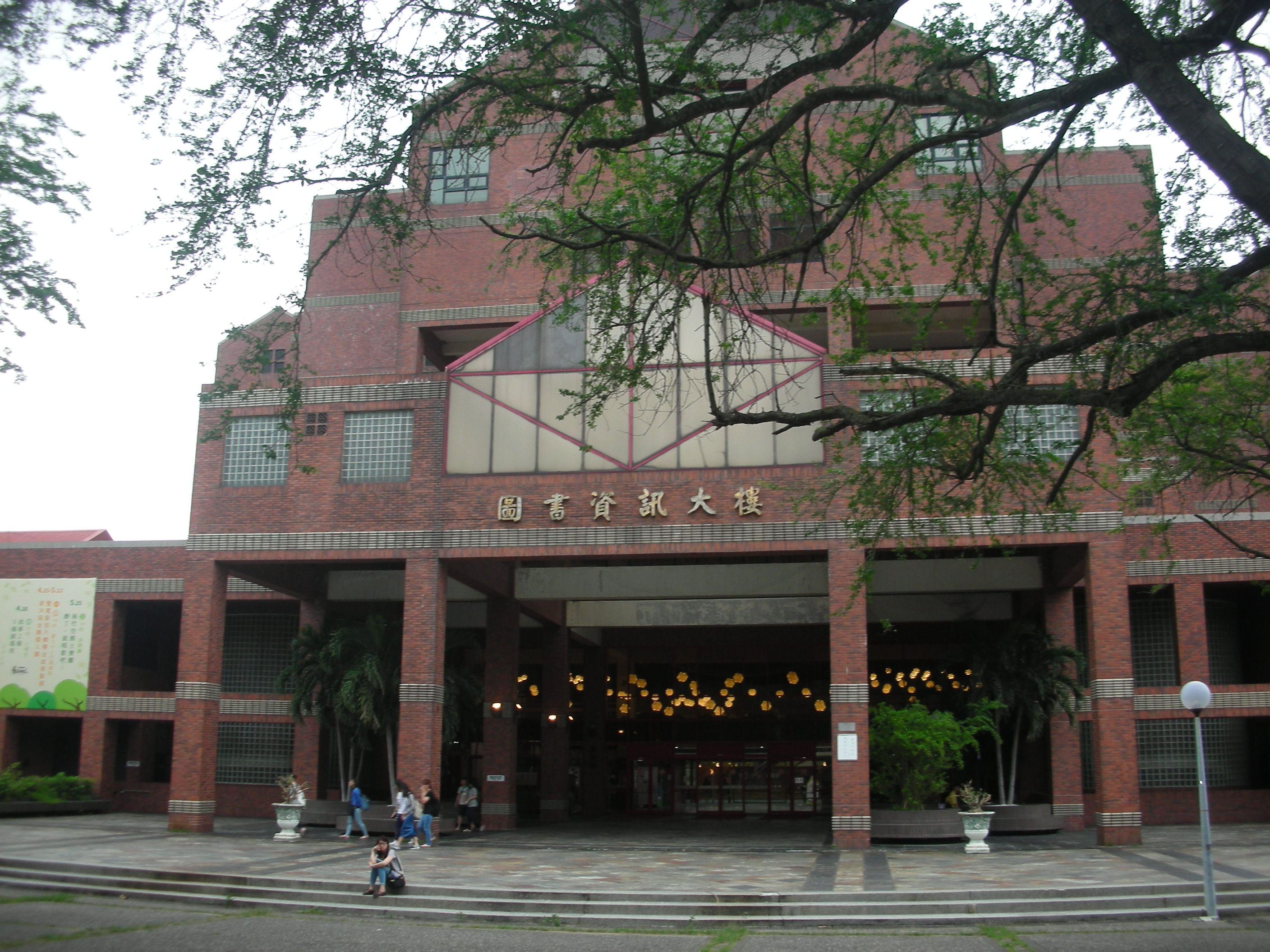
- 23°33′48.0″N 120°28′26.8″E
- Location: Minxiong, Chiayi County, Taiwan
- Type: Academic library
- Established: 1989

Collection
- Size: 1 million

Other information
- Director: Tsai Jung-ting
- Website: Official website

The National Chung Cheng University Library (traditional Chinese: 中正大學圖書館; simplified Chinese: 中正大学图书馆; pinyin: Zhōngzhèng Dàxué Túshūguǎn) is an academic library in Minxiong Township, Chiayi County, Taiwan as part of National Chung Cheng University.

== History ==
The library was established in 1989. In 1993, it moved to its current building.

== Architecture ==
The library building consists of 8 floors and one basement. It has arts exhibition area, audio and video resource center, circulation desk, comic books area, computer area, dining area, garden, information reception, learning and discussion space, lecture room, multimedia workroom, newspaper area, reading room, reference book area, reference services, self-service book check out and return, study hall etc.

== See also ==
- Education in Taiwan
