= Chen Jenn-yeu =

- 陳振宇
- Born: 1955 (age 70–71)
- Education: National Taiwan Normal University (BA); Stony Brook University (MA, PhD); Columbia University (MS)

Chen Jenn-yeu (Chinese: 陳振宇; pinyin: Chén Zhènyǔ, born 1955) is the dean of the College of International Studies and Social Sciences and the director of the Graduate Institute and the Department of Chinese as a Second Language at National Taiwan Normal University.

Chen received his Ph.D. degree in experimental/cognitive psychology in 1987 from the State University of New York at Stony Brook (now known as Stony Brook University). He has a broad interest in the theoretical and applied issues related to attention and language processing. His fields of interest include cognitive psychology, psycholinguistics, neuropsychology, psychometrics and biostatistics.

Most of his research can be summarized under the conceptual framework of artifact-augmented cognition. Under this framework, cognition is not an isolated phenomenon, but almost always operates in the context of a human created artifactual environment. How cognition and artifacts interact and mutually influence each other is an issue that lies at the center of this research orientation. On the theoretical side, the focus of research is more on cognitive diversity than on cognitive universal, i.e., how cognition varies across cultures, languages, and artifacts (e.g., paper and pencil vs. computer and keyboard). On the applied side, Chen focuses on studying how the design of artifacts can better fit the human cognitive system and ensure a net gain of sufficient benefits.

== Education ==
- Ph.D., the Department of Psychology, the State University of New York at Stony Brook.
- M.S., the Department of Biostatistics, Columbia University.
- M.A., the Department of Linguistics, the State University of New York at Stony Brook.
- B.A., the Department of English, National Taiwan Normal University.

== Positions ==
- Dean, the College of International Studies and Social Sciences, National Taiwan Normal University. August 2014 – Present
- Chairman, the Department of Chinese as a Second Language, National Taiwan Normal University. August 2014 – Present
- Chairman, the Department of Chinese as a Second Language, National Taiwan Normal University. August 2013-July 2014
- Full-Time Professor, the Department of Chinese as a Second Language, National Taiwan Normal University. September 2011-July 2013
- Full-Time Professor, the Institute of Cognitive Science and the Department of Psychology, National Cheng Kung University. August 2008-August 2011
- Chairman, the Institute of Cognitive Science, National Cheng Kung University. June 2008-July 2008
- Dean, the College of Social Science, National Cheng Kung University. August 2003-July 2006
- Director, the Institute of Education, National Cheng Kung University. August 2003-July 2006
- Chairman, the Department of Psychology, National Chung Cheng University. August 2000-July 2003
- Full-Time Professor, the Department of Psychology, National Chung Cheng University. August 1998-July 2000
- Associate Professor, the Department of Psychology, National Chung Cheng University. August 1992-July 1998
- Researcher, Medical Center of Mental Health and Psychiatry, The Child and Adolescent Psychiatry Clinic, the State University of New York. June 1990-May 1992.
- Postdoctoral Researcher, the Department of Neurology, Columbia University. January 1988-May 1988.
- Part-Time Assistant Professor, the Department of Psychology, Barnard College, Columbia University. January 1988-May 1988.
- Lecturer, the Department of Psychology, the State University of New York at Stony Brook. September 1984-December 1987
- Teaching Assistant, the Department of Psychology, the State University of New York at Stony Brook. September 1982-August 1984
