= Jingmei railway station =

Railway station in Xiulin, Taiwan

Jingmei 景美車站
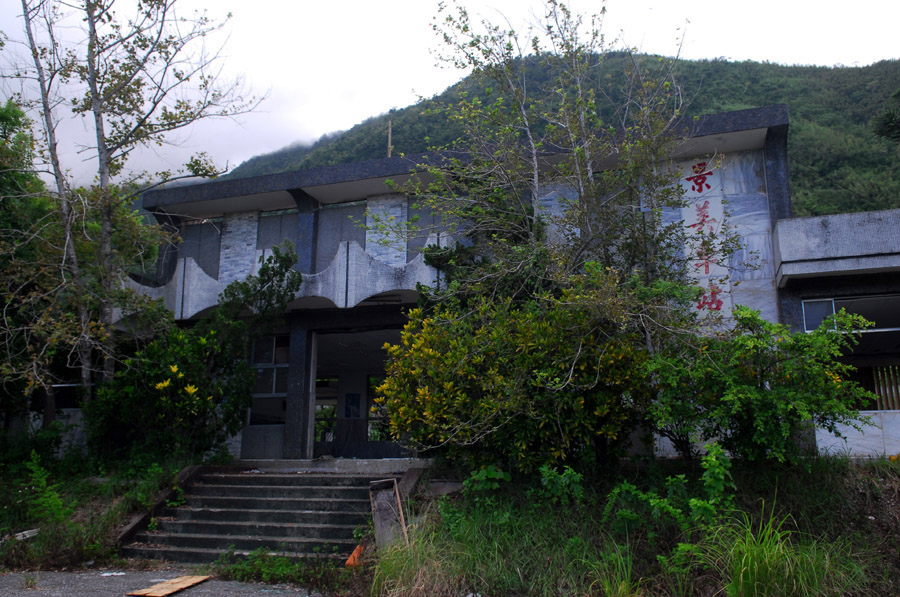

General information
- Location: Xiulin, Hualien County, Taiwan
- Coordinates: 24°5′24.4″N 121°36′39.2″E
- System: Railway station
- Owner: Taiwan Railway
- Operator: Taiwan Railway
- Line: North-link
- Train operators: Taiwan Railway

History
- Opened: 26 July 1975

Passengers
- 1,295,466 daily (2024)

Services
| Preceding station | Taiwan Railway | Following station |
|---|---|---|
| Xincheng towards Badu | Eastern Trunk line | Beipu towards Taitung |
Location

Jingmei (Chinese: 景美車站; pinyin: Jǐngměi Chēzhàn) is a railway station on Taiwan Railway North-link line located in Xiulin Township, Hualien County, Taiwan.

== History ==
The station was opened on 26 July 1975.

== See also ==
- List of railway stations in Taiwan
