= Chiayi Performing Arts Center =

Art center in Minxiong, Chiayi County, Taiwan

Chiayi Performing Arts Center.
- 嘉義縣表演藝術中心
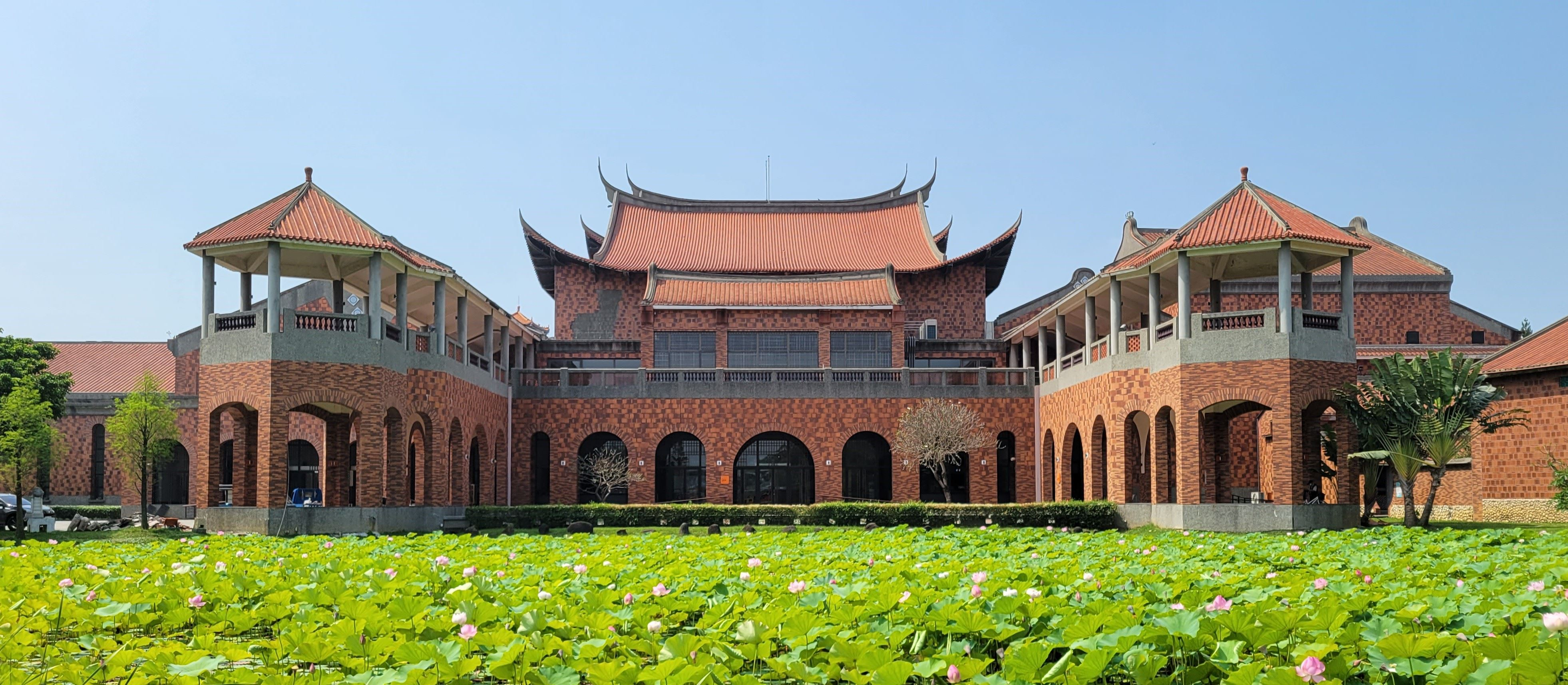
- Interactive map of Chiayi Performing Arts Center.
- Location: Minxiong, Chiayi County, Taiwan
- Coordinates: 23°32′38.1″N 120°25′54.2″E
- Type: theatre

Construction
- Groundbreaking: 1997
- Built: 2005
- Opened: 10 May 2005

The Chiayi Performing Arts Center (traditional Chinese: 嘉義縣表演藝術中心; simplified Chinese: 嘉义县表演艺术中心; pinyin: Jiāyì Xiàn Biǎoyǎn Yìshù Zhōngxīn) is an art center in Minxiong Township, Chiayi County, Taiwan.

== History ==
The planning for the center began in 1995 and the construction started in 1997. Due to budget constraint, the construction was suspended twice in 1998 and 1999. The construction eventually completed in 2005. The first show performed at the center happened on 22-23 April 2005 and the center was officially opened on 10 May 2005.

== Architecture ==
The center is built in a 6.1 hectares of land, which consists of auditorium, theater hall, rehearsal classroom, open air theater, art gallery, tourist service area, restaurant, shop, stage, pavilion etc.

== Transportation ==
The arts center is accessible within walking distance south of Minxiong Station of Taiwan Railway.

== See also ==
- List of tourist attractions in Taiwan
