= Jiabei railway station =

Railway station in Chiayi, Taiwan

Jiabei Station 嘉北車站
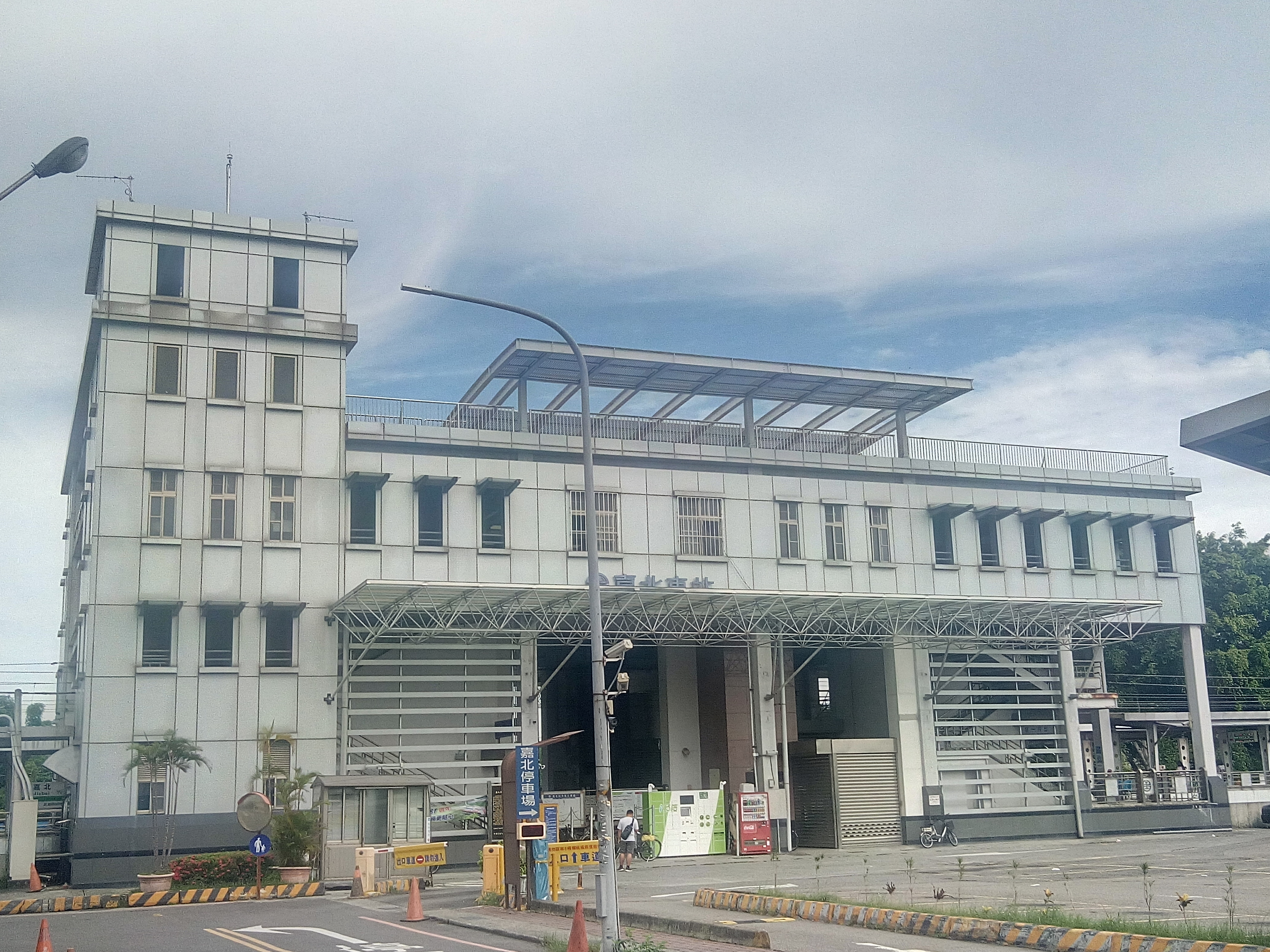

General information
- Location: East, Chiayi City, Taiwan
- Coordinates: 23°29′58.7″N 120°26′55.3″E
- Owner: Taiwan Railway Corporation
- Operator: Taiwan Railway Corporation
- Line: West Coast
- Train operators: Taiwan Railway Corporation

History
- Opened: 8 September 2005
Location

Jiabei (Chinese: 嘉北車站; pinyin: Jiāběi Chēzhàn) (Chiabei, literally "Chia north", meaning "north of Chiayi") is a railway station of the Taiwan Railway West Coast line located in East District, Chiayi City, Taiwan.

== History ==
The station was opened on 8 September 2005.

In 2023, human remains between 2,500 and 2,700 years old were discovered during a railway elevation project.

== See also ==
- List of railway stations in Taiwan

Preceding station	Taiwan Railway	Following station
Minxiong towards Keelung	Western Trunk line	Chiayi towards Pingtung
