= Xincheng railway station =

Railway station in Hualien County, Taiwan

Xincheng Taroko Station 新城太魯閣車站
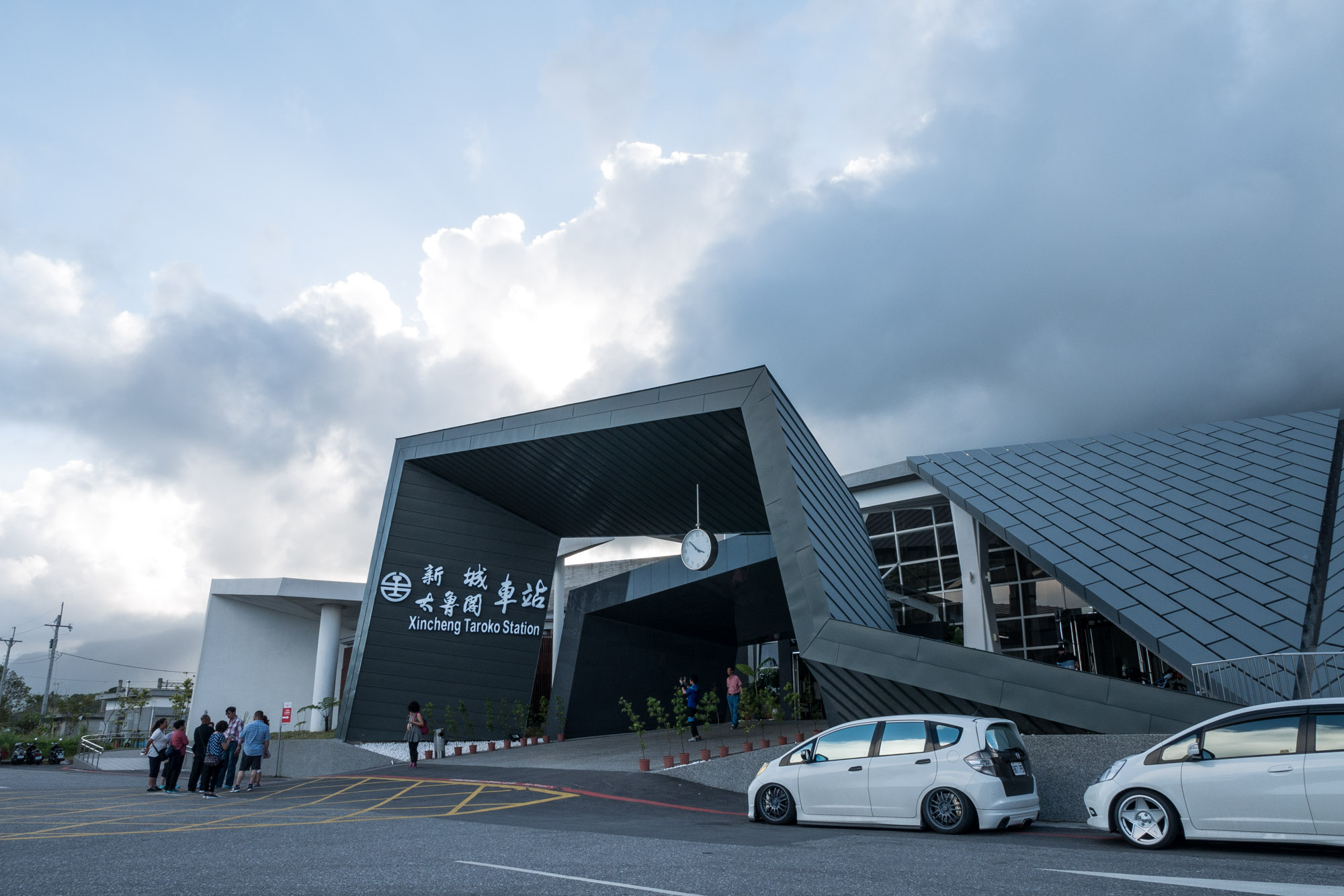

General information
- Location: Xincheng, Hualien County, Taiwan
- Coordinates: 24°7′39.5″N 121°38′26.3″E
- System: Railway station
- Owner: Taiwan Railway
- Operator: Taiwan Railway
- Line: North-link
- Train operators: Taiwan Railway

History
- Opened: 26 July 1975

Passengers
- 980 daily (2024)

Services
Preceding station	Taiwan Railway	Following station
Chongde towards Badu	Eastern Trunk line	Jingmei towards Taitung
Location

Xincheng Station (Chinese: 新城車站; pinyin: Xīnchéng Chēzhàn) is a railway station of Taiwan Railway North-link line located in Xincheng Township, Hualien County, Taiwan. To promote the sight-seeing in nearby area, the local committees decided to change the station name to Taroko (Chinese: 太魯閣車站; pinyin: Tàilǔgé Chēzhàn) according to the famous Taroko Gorge. The new name was effective from August 2007. But during the transition period, most of the signs contain both name versions of the station to avoid ambiguity.

== Around the station ==
- Taroko National Park

== See also ==
- List of railway stations in Taiwan
