= Qixingtan Beach =

Beach in Xincheng, Hualien County, Taiwan

Qixingtan Beach 七星潭
- beach
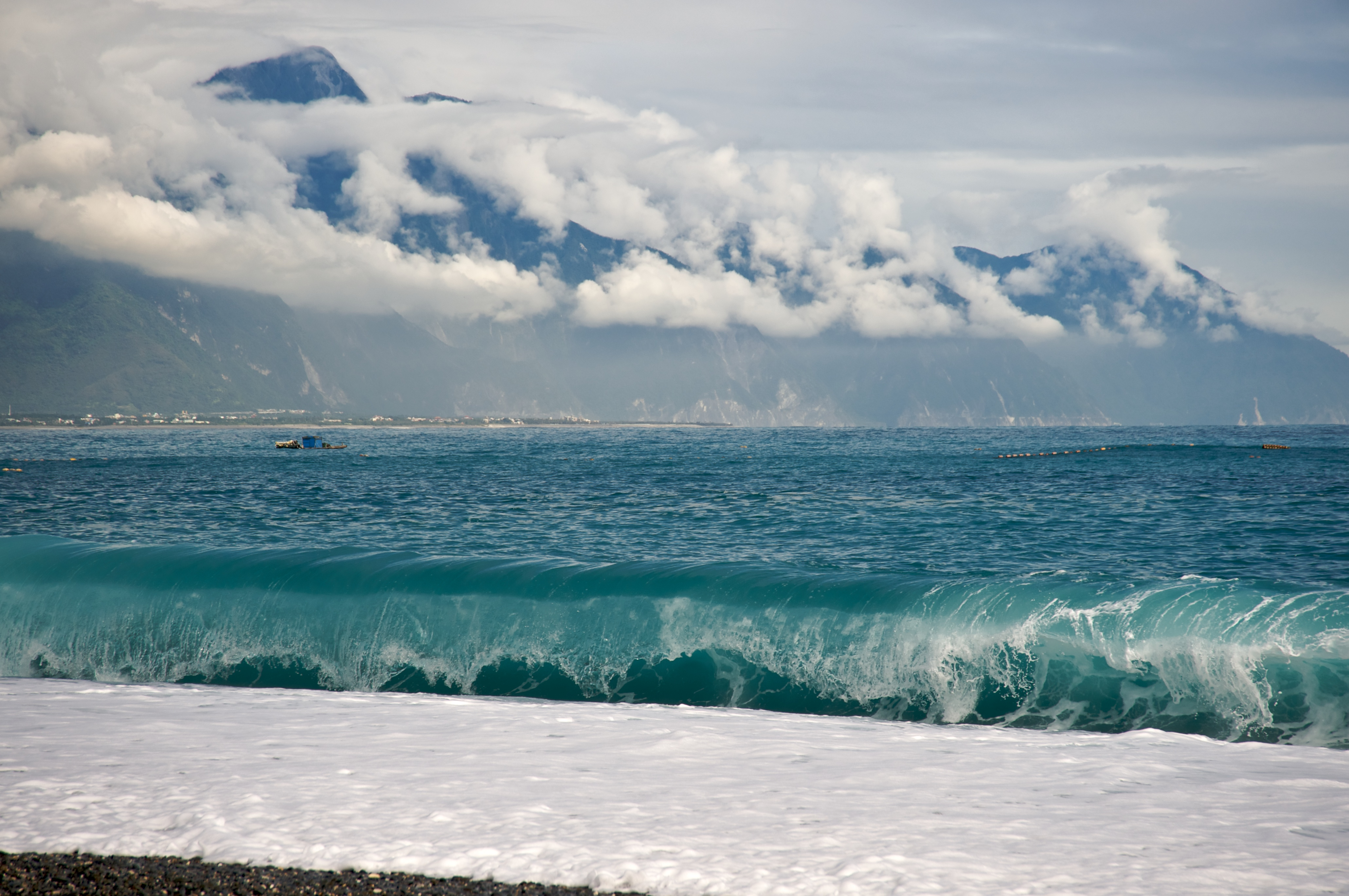

- Coordinates: 24°01′58.4″N 121°37′40.6″E
- Location: Xincheng, Hualien County, Taiwan
- Access: Beipu Station

The Qixingtan Beach or Chihsingtan Beach or in Sakizaya language Malongayangay (traditional Chinese: 七星潭海邊; simplified Chinese: 七星潭海边; pinyin: Qīxīngtán Hǎibiān) is a beach in Xincheng Township, Hualien County, Taiwan facing the Pacific Ocean.

== Naming and history ==
Qixingtan Beach was originally located at the east of Hualien airport. Its shape is like the Big Dipper, so it is called Qixingtan. Back in 1936, Japanese government filled the lake in order to build the Hualien airport, and now there are only four ponds left.

Japanese government forced the residents who lived at the original Qixingtan to move to “Crescent Bay”. The residents named the place Qixingtan in memory of the original Qixingtan.

In June 2009, officials from Hualien County Government made a proposal to the Department of Environmental Protection to abolish the Qixingtan Environmental Impact Statement. Consequently, this led to the construction of private and large-scale development projects at the beach.

== Features ==
Located in a half moon-like shape gulf, the beach is famous for its beautiful natural landscape. It attracts thousands of tourists every year to visit the beach. Nearby the beach lies the Chihsing Tan Katsuo Museum.

== Transportation ==
The beach is accessible within walking distance East from Beipu Station of Taiwan Railway.

== See also ==
- List of tourist attractions in Taiwan
