= Chihsing Tan Katsuo Museum =

Museum in Xincheng, Hualien County, Taiwan

- 七星柴魚博物館
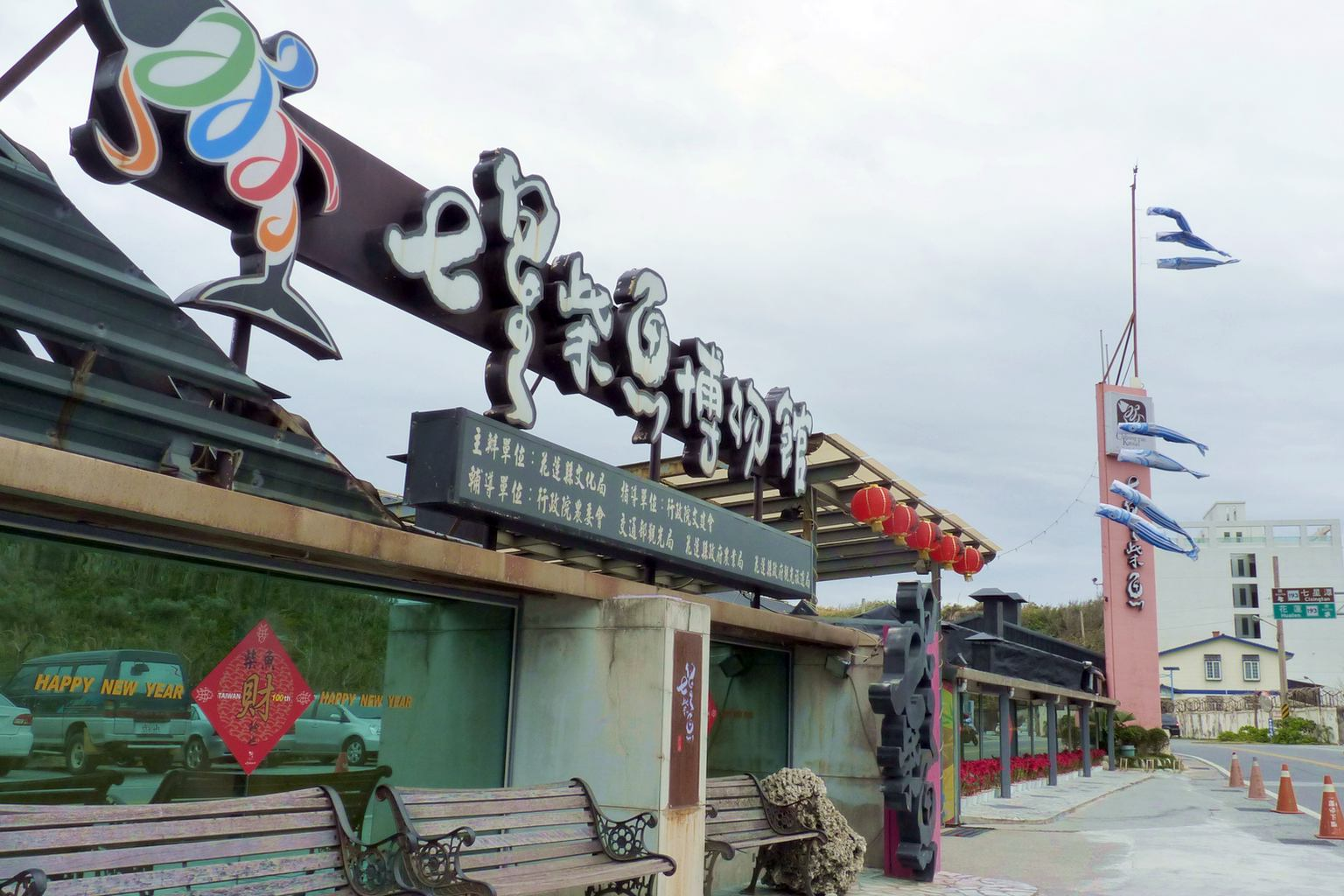
- Established: 2003
- Location: Xincheng, Hualien County, Taiwan
- Coordinates: 24°01′37″N 121°37′46″E
- Type: museum
- Website: Official website (in Chinese)

The Chihsing Tan Katsuo Museum (traditional Chinese: 七星柴魚博物館; simplified Chinese: 七星柴鱼博物馆; pinyin: Qīxīng Cháiyú Bówùguǎn) is a museum in Dahan Village, Xincheng Township, Hualien County, Taiwan. The museum is close to Qixingtan Beach and is dedicated to dried bonito fish (katsuobushi).

== History ==
The museum was once a Japanese Katsuobushi factory which produced small dried fish flakes that would then be used in many Japanese dishes. It was then reopened as a museum in 2003.

== Architecture ==
The museum is housed in a 3-story building.

== Exhibitions ==
The museum exhibits the history of the bonito fish in Taiwan since the Japanese era.

== Transportation ==
The museum is accessible east from Beipu Station of the Taiwan Railway.

== See also ==
- List of museums in Taiwan
