= Beipu railway station =

Railway station in Xincheng, Taiwan

Beipu 北埔車站
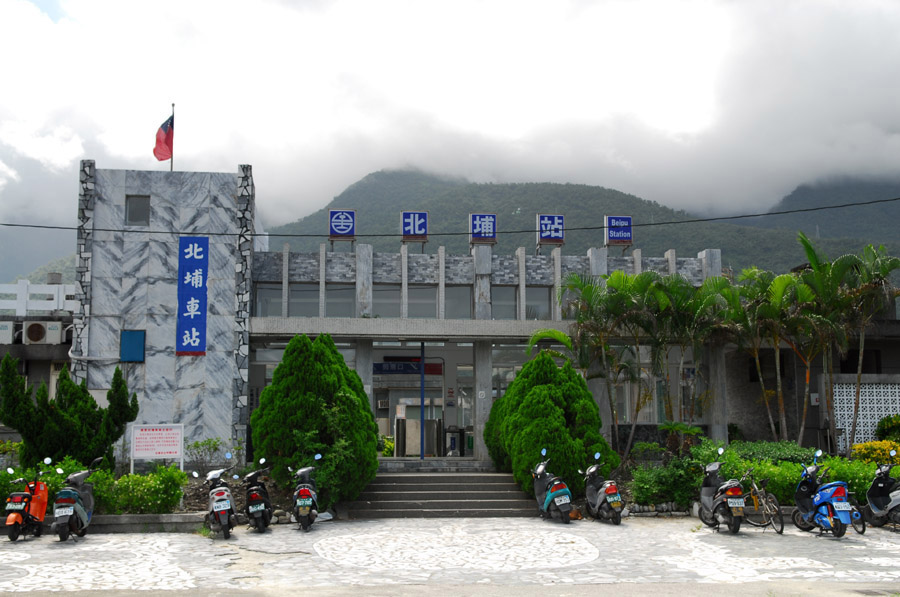

General information
- Location: Xincheng, Hualien County, Taiwan
- Coordinates: 24°1′56.6″N 121°36′4.7″E
- System: Railway station
- Owner: Taiwan Railway
- Operator: Taiwan Railway
- Line: North-link
- Train operators: Taiwan Railway

History
- Opened: 26 July 1975

Passengers
- 343 daily (2024)

Services
Preceding station	Taiwan Railway	Following station
Jingmei towards Badu	Eastern Trunk line	Hualien towards Taitung
Location

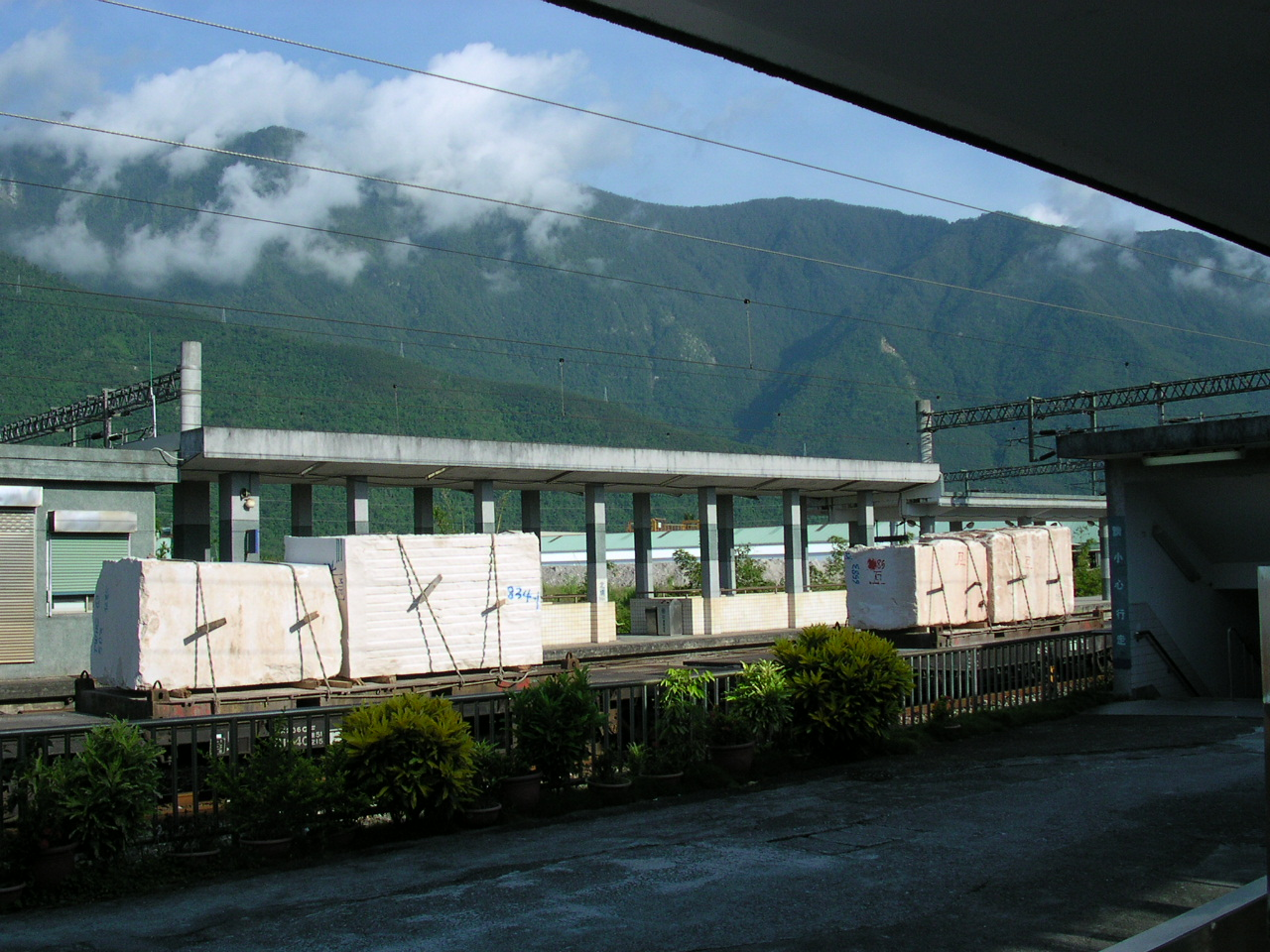
Beipu station platform

Beipu (Chinese: 北埔車站; pinyin: Běipù Chēzhàn) is a railway station on Taiwan Railway North-link line located in Xincheng Township, Hualien County, Taiwan.

== History ==
The station was opened on 26 July 1975.

== Around the station ==
- Chihsing Tan Katsuo Museum
- Dahan Institute of Technology
- Hualien Airport
- Qixingtan Beach

== See also ==
- List of railway stations in Taiwan
