= National Radio Museum =

Museum in Minxiong, Chiayi County, Taiwan

- 國家廣播文物館
- Established: 1999
- Location: Minxiong, Chiayi County, Taiwan
- Coordinates: 23°33′53″N 120°25′47″E
- Type: museum
- Owner: Radio Taiwan International
- Public transit access: Minxiong Station

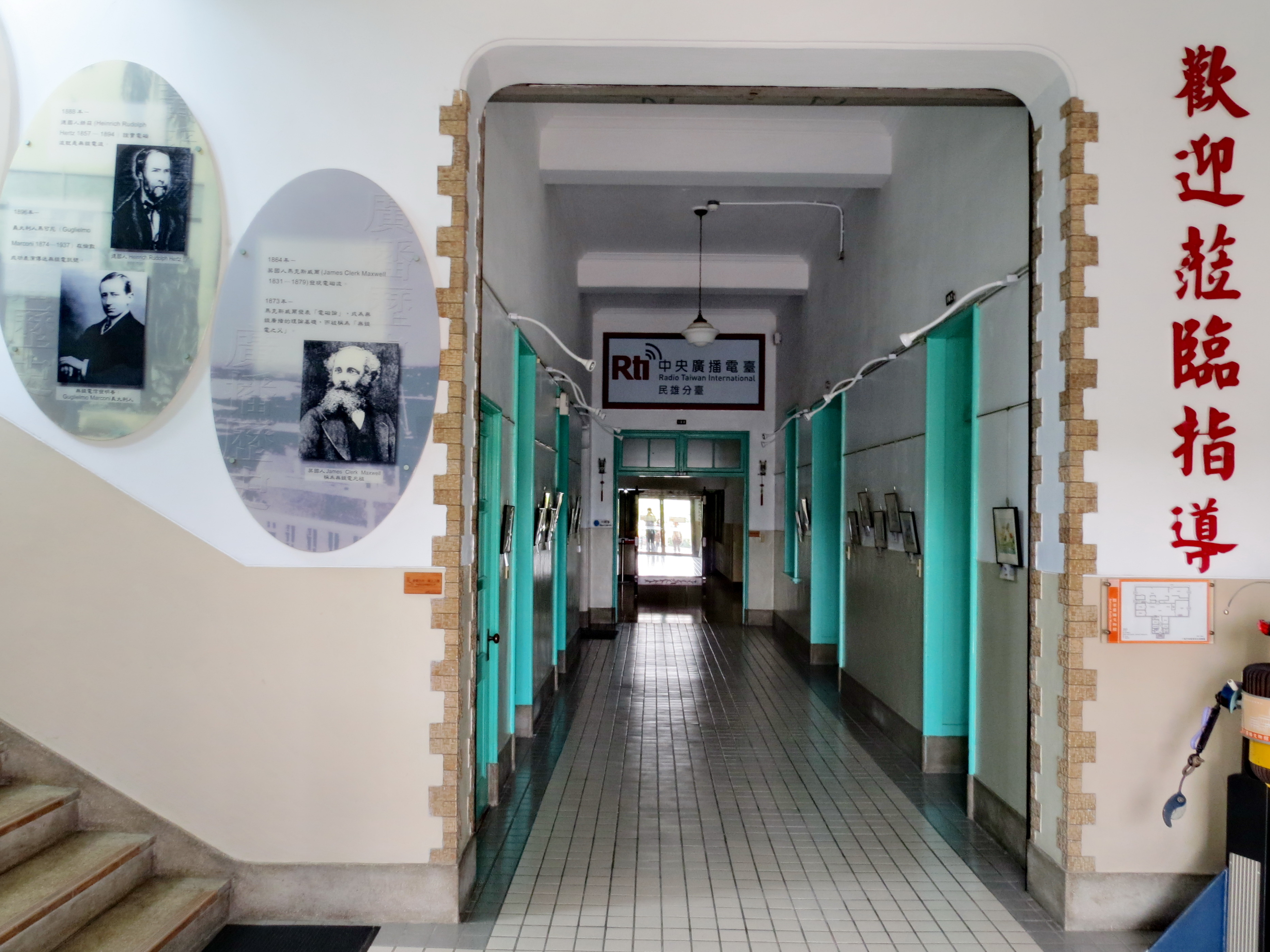
National Radio Museum exhibition halls

The National Radio Museum (traditional Chinese: 國家廣播文物館; simplified Chinese: 国家广播文物馆; pinyin: Guójiā Guǎngbò Wénwùguǎn) is a museum about radio broadcasting in Minxiong Township, Chiayi County, Taiwan.

== History ==
The museum building was originally used for the Minxiong Broadcasting Bureau during the Japanese rule which were built in 1938 and came into operation on 28 September 1940. It was used by the Japanese government as psychological warfare broadcasting during World War II. After the Chinese Civil War in 1949, it became the base for Radio Taiwan International propagating psychological warfare broadcasting towards Mainland China. In 1993, the building became a local cultural center with the Department of Cultural and Creative Development. In 1999, the National Radio Museum was established on the building.

== Galleries ==
- Transparent Broadcast Room
- Live Antique Transmitter Room
- Special Exhibition Room

== Exhibitions ==
The museum exhibits various artifacts and materials on the broadcasting and radio history of Taiwan, including classified intelligence materials used previously.

== Transportation ==
The museum is accessible within walking distance north from Minxiong Station of Taiwan Railway.

== See also ==
- List of museums in Taiwan
