= Dahan Institute of Technology =

University in Xincheng, Hualien County, Taiwan

- 大漢技術學院
- Type: Private
- Active: June 1977 (as Dahan Junior College of Engineering and Business); 1 August 1999 (as Dahan Institute of Technology)–1 August 2025
- Location: Xincheng, Hualien County, Taiwan; 24.039°N 121.608°E
- Website: Official website

Dahan Institute of Technology
- Traditional Chinese: 大漢技術學院
Transcriptions
Standard Mandarin
- Hanyu Pinyin: Dàhàn Jìshù Xuéyuàn
Southern Min
- Hokkien POJ: Tāi-hàn Ki-su̍t Ha̍k-īⁿ

Dahan Institute of Technology (DAHAN; Chinese: 大漢技術學院; Pe̍h-ōe-jī: Tāi-hàn Ki-su̍t Ha̍k-īⁿ) was a private university located in Xincheng District, Hualien County, Taiwan.

Dahan Institute of Technology offered a range of undergraduate and graduate programs in areas such as electrical engineering, mechanical engineering, civil engineering, electronic engineering, computer science, design, and management. The institute also offered doctoral programs in engineering and design.

The school closed in 2025 due to declining enrollment. At its peak, it had an enrollment of over 7,000 students.

== History ==
DAHAN was founded in June 1977 as Dahan Junior College of Engineering and Business. On 1 August 1999, the college was renamed Dahan Institute of Technology.

== Faculty ==
- College of Industry
- College of Management
- College of Tourism
- General Education

== Transportation ==
The school is accessible within walking distance north-east of Beipu Station of Taiwan Railway.

== See also ==
- List of universities in Taiwan
