= Minxiong railway station =

Railway station in Minxiong, Chiayi, Taiwan

Minxiong Station 民雄車站
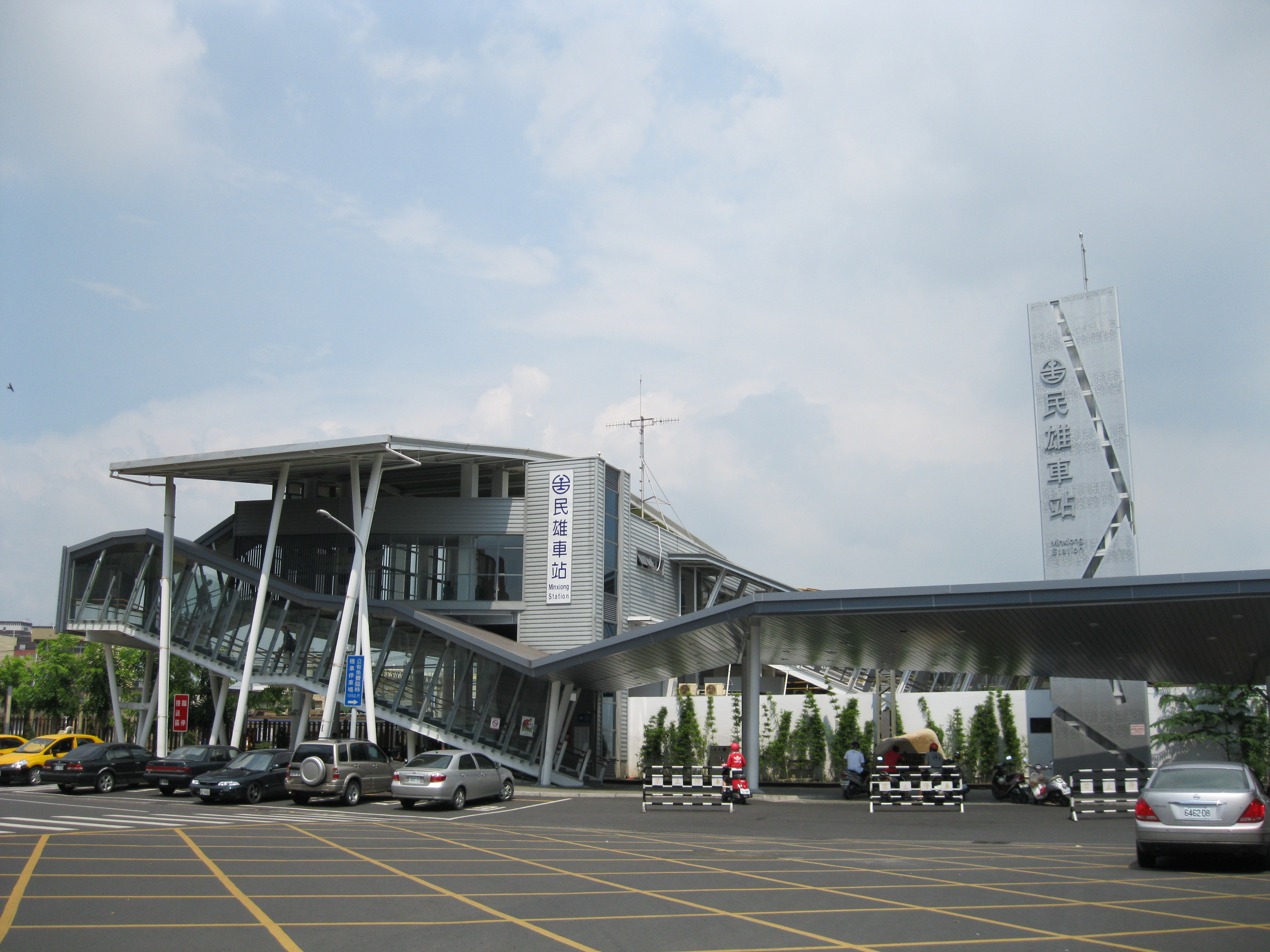

General information
- Location: Minxiong, Chiayi County, Taiwan
- Coordinates: 23°33′18.3″N 120°25′53.3″E
- Owner: Taiwan Railway Corporation
- Operator: Taiwan Railway Corporation
- Line: West Coast
- Train operators: Taiwan Railway Corporation

History
- Opened: 15 December 1903; 122 years ago
Location

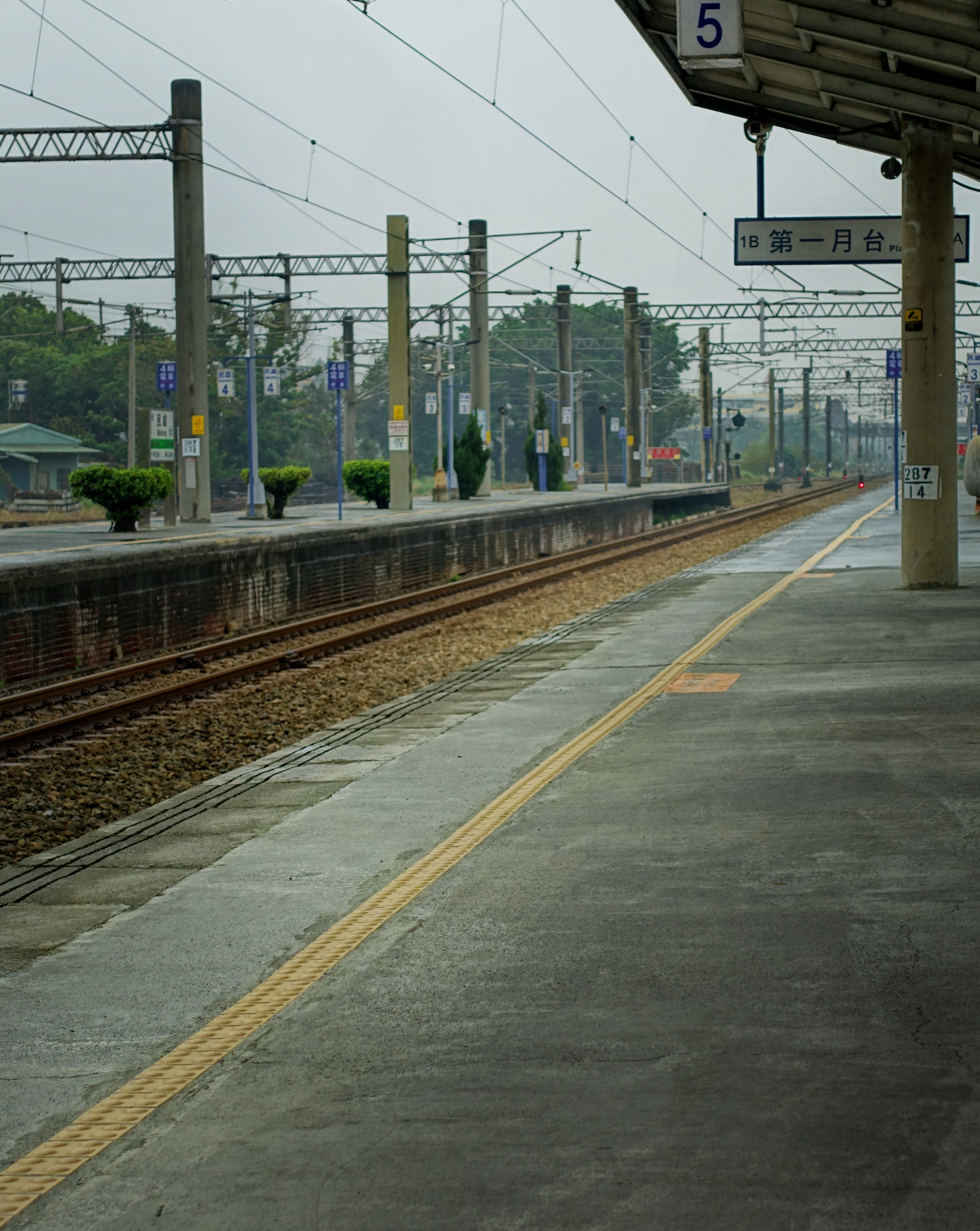
Minxiong station, Platform 1

Minxiong (Chinese: 民雄車站; Hanyu Pinyin: Mínxióng Chēzhàn; Tongyong Pinyin: Mínsyóng Chejhàn) is a railway station on the Taiwan Railway West Coast line located in Minxiong Township, Chiayi County, Taiwan.

== History ==
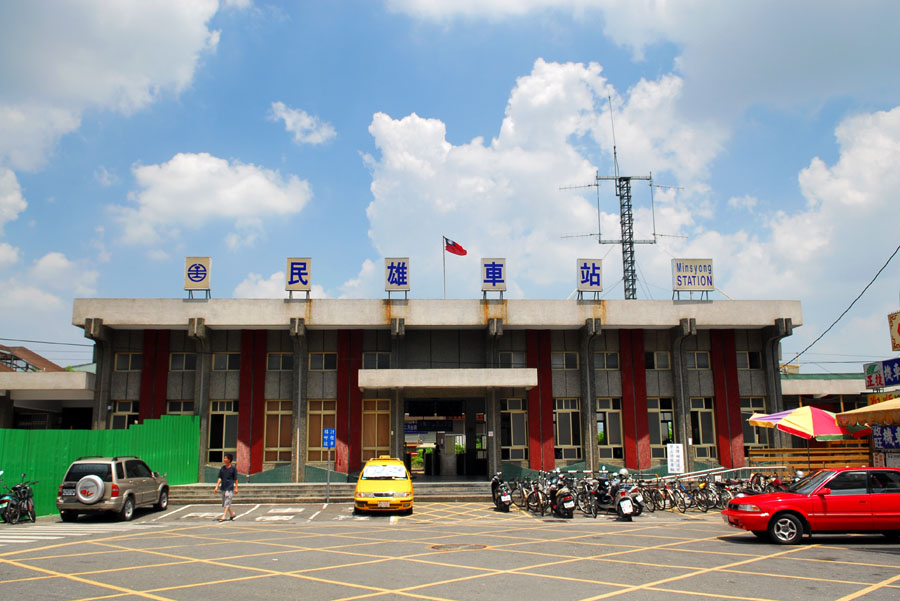
Minxiong station old building

The station was originally opened on 15 December 1903. The station got its new building on 23 October 2009 and was officially opened on 12 January 2010.

== Around the station ==
- Chiahui Power Plant
- Chiayi Performing Arts Center
- National Radio Museum
- WuFeng University

== See also ==
- List of railway stations in Taiwan

| Preceding station | Taiwan Railway | Following station |
|---|---|---|
| Dalin towards Keelung | Western Trunk line | Jiabei towards Pingtung |
