= Ho Ming-teh =

Taiwanese engineer (1922–1998)

- 何明德
- Born: 1922; Minxiong, Chiayi County, Taiwan
- Died: 1 February 1998 (aged 75–76); Chiayi, Chiayi County, Taiwan
- Resting place: Puzhao Temple, Chiayi
- Education: Juifang School of Civil Engineering
- Organization: Chiayi Philanthropy Group
- Awards: Ramon Magsaysay Award (1995)

Ho Ming-teh (Chinese: 何明德; pinyin: Hé Míngdé; 1922–1998) was a Taiwanese engineer and community activist who built more than 200 bridges in remote areas of Taiwan. In 1995, he received the Ramon Magsaysay Award for Community Leadership in recognition of his "good deeds and sturdy bridges".

== Personal life ==
Ho was born in Minxiong, a rural township in Chiayi County, into a poor farming family. He went on to study civil engineering at Juifang School of Civil Engineering, and worked for many years building irrigation sluices for the Chiayi County government. Ho also ran a grocer's shop in Chiayi.

Ho was a practising Buddhist and an active member of the Youtian Temple in Chiayi. Following the death of his son in a car accident, he decided to focus more on community activism, citing the Buddhist philosophy of helping others.

Ho died at his home in Chiayi on 1 February 1998 of liver disease. He was survived by his wife, four children and seven grandchildren; at the time of his death, he had built 228 bridges. His ashes were placed in Puzhao Temple.

== Activism ==
Starting in 1965, Ho began to take part in community activism; for example, in 1965 he began organising volunteers to fill potholes in Chiayi.

In 1971, Ho became aware of a wooden bridge that had been swept away in Chungpu Township; two brothers had subsequently drowned after attempting to ford their way to school. Ho launched a fundraising campaign to rebuild the bridge; within a few months, Ho had raised enough money to construct a new bridge with the support of 22 volunteers. While Ho was a trained engineer, he was not a bridge designer; while he would assess the need for a bridge, draw up a plan, source the materials and co-ordinate with local officials, and would work with professional engineers and contractors on the design and construction of the bridges themselves. Ho's actions building the bridge in Chungpu led to some attention; in 1972, a local magistrate donated NT$50, 000 for Ho to build a bridge between the townships of Meishan and Dalin, and by December 1972, he had 100 volunteers helping him construct a bridge in Shakeng, a village in Zhuqi.

Upon the inauguration of his 100th bridge, Ho formally established the Chiayi Philanthropy Group. In addition to building bridges, the organisation also helped poor families pay for funeral expenses, and promoted Taiwanese people volunteering weekly to "the cheerful work of helping others"; the CPG would often meet groups of volunteers on Sundays before setting off to build bridges in Chiayi, Tainan and Yunlin counties. By 1995, the CPG had 80, 000 members and had built 215 bridges; by Ho's death in 1990, it had 220, 000 members and had built 229 bridges.

In 2002, the Ho Ming-teh Charitable Group was established by Ho's daughter, Chen, and her husband Hsiao, to carry on the legacy of the Chiayi Philanthropy Group. In 2021, two leaders of the Ho Ming-teh Charitable Group were charged with misappropriating NT$700 million from donations over 18 years.

== Recognition ==
In 1995, Ho was awarded the Ramon Magsaysay Award for Community Leadership in recognition of his "good deeds and sturdy bridges".
