= National Chung Cheng University =

Public university in Minxiong Township, Taiwan

- 國立中正大學 (Chinese)
- Motto: 積極創新,修德澤人; Chek-ke̍k Chhòng-sin, Siu-tek te̍k-jîn
- Motto in English: To innovate with earnestness; be virtuous with altruism
- Established: July 1, 1989
- President: Shaw-Jenq Tsai
- Academic staff: 728
- Students: 11,540
- Undergraduates: 6,653
- Postgraduates: 4,350
- Doctoral students: 537
- Location: Minxiong, Chiayi County, Taiwan
- Campus: Rural
- Website: www.ccu.edu.tw

Chinese name
- Simplified Chinese: 国立中正大学
- Traditional Chinese: 國立中正大學
- Literal meaning: National Chiang Kai-shek University
Transcriptions
Standard Mandarin
- Hanyu Pinyin: Guólì Zhōngzhèng Dàxué
Southern Min
- Hokkien POJ: Kok-li̍p Tiong-chèng Tāi-ha̍k

National Chung Cheng University (CCU; Chinese: 國立中正大學; pinyin: Guólì Zhōngzhèng Dàxué) is a national university in Minxiong, Chiayi County, Taiwan. It is a member of the Association to Advance Collegiate Schools of Business.

== History ==
National Chung Cheng University was the first public university established after Taiwan's economic boom of the 1980s. In 1986, in order to promote research and to develop higher education in the Yunlin, Chiayi and Tainan areas, the government approved a plan to establish a strongly research-oriented university in Chiayi. It was named after Chiang Kai-shek and officially founded on July 1, 1989. Lin Ching-Jiang (林清江) served as its first president.

== Faculties ==
CCU is organized into seven colleges: Education, Engineering, Humanities, Law, Management, Sciences, and Social Sciences. The National Chung Cheng University Library is located on the Minxiong campus.

== Rankings ==
National Chung Cheng University rankings

Global – Overall
- CWUR World: 1588 (2024)
- QS World: 951-1000 (2026)
- THE World: 1201-1500 (2024)
- USNWR Global: 1705 (2023)

Regional – Overall
- QS Arab region: (2025)
- QS Asia: 189
- THE Asia: 501–600 (2023)

National – Overall
- CWUR National: 25 (2024)
- QS National: 17 (2025)
- THE National: 21 (2024)
- USNWR National: 23 (2023)

The QS World University Rankings (2025) placed it at 1001-1200th worldwide. Meanwhile, CCU ranked 1438th in the world (2024) in the Webometrics Ranking of World Universities. USNEWS (2023) placed CCU 1705th in the world.

== In popular culture ==
CCU is notable for being the filming location of the Taiwanese television drama Meteor Garden.

== See also ==
- List of universities in Taiwan
