= Xincheng, Hualien =

Xincheng Township 新城鄉 Kenkai, Sincheng
- Rural township
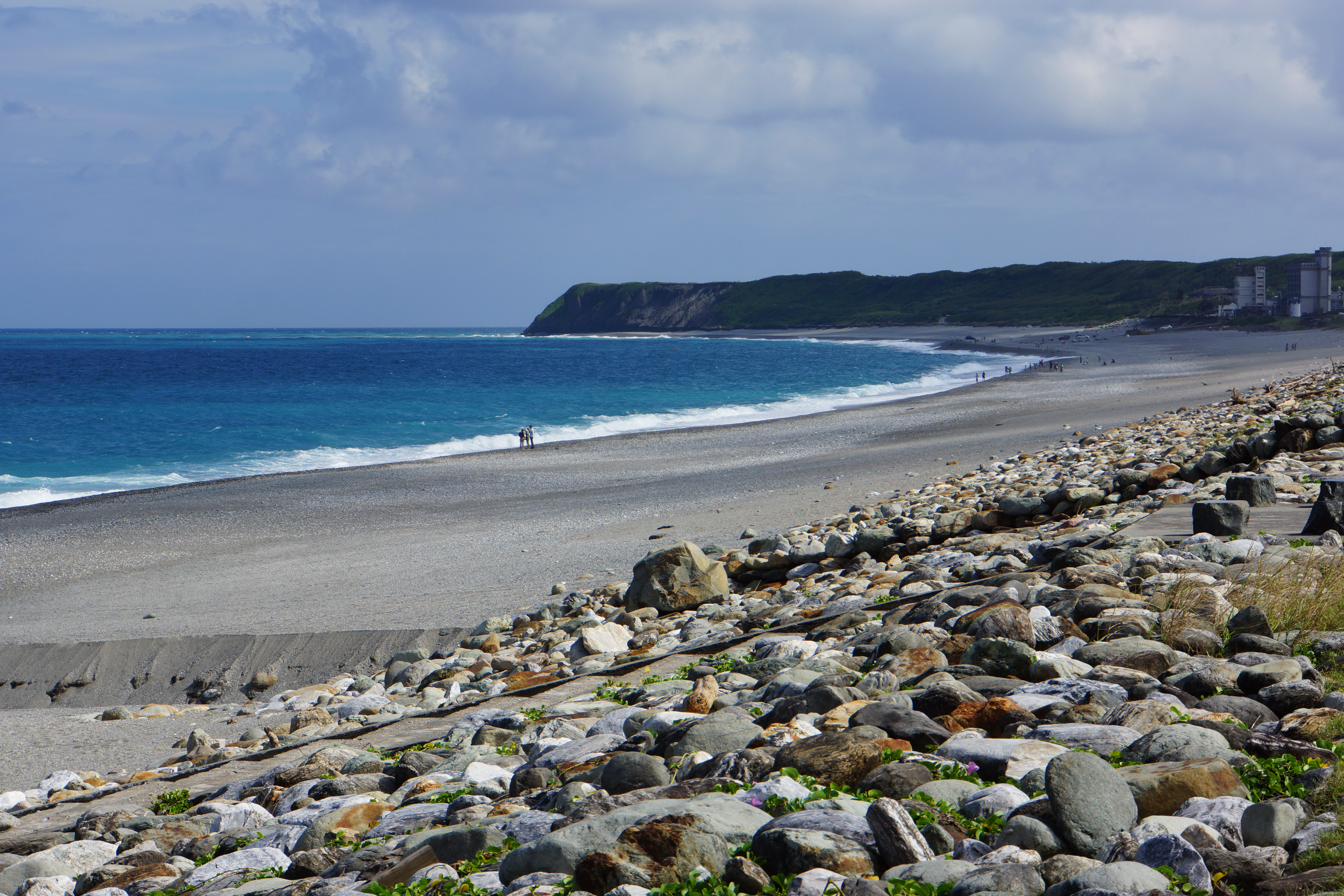
- The shoreline in Xincheng Township

- Location within Taiwan
- Coordinates: 24°3′5″N 121°36′30″E
- Country: Taiwan
- Region: Eastern Taiwan

Government
  - Type: Township

Area
  - Total: 29.4059 km^{2} (11.3537 sq mi)

Population (February 2023)
  - Total: 20,308
- Time zone: UTC+8 (CST)
- Post code: 971
- Subdivision: 8 Villages
- Website: www.sinchen.gov.tw (Chinese)

Xincheng Township or Sincheng Township (Chinese: 新城鄉; pinyin: Xīnchéng Xiāng) is a rural township located in north of Hualien County, Taiwan, and has a population of 20,308 inhabitants and 8 villages. It is also the smallest township in Hualien County.

== History ==
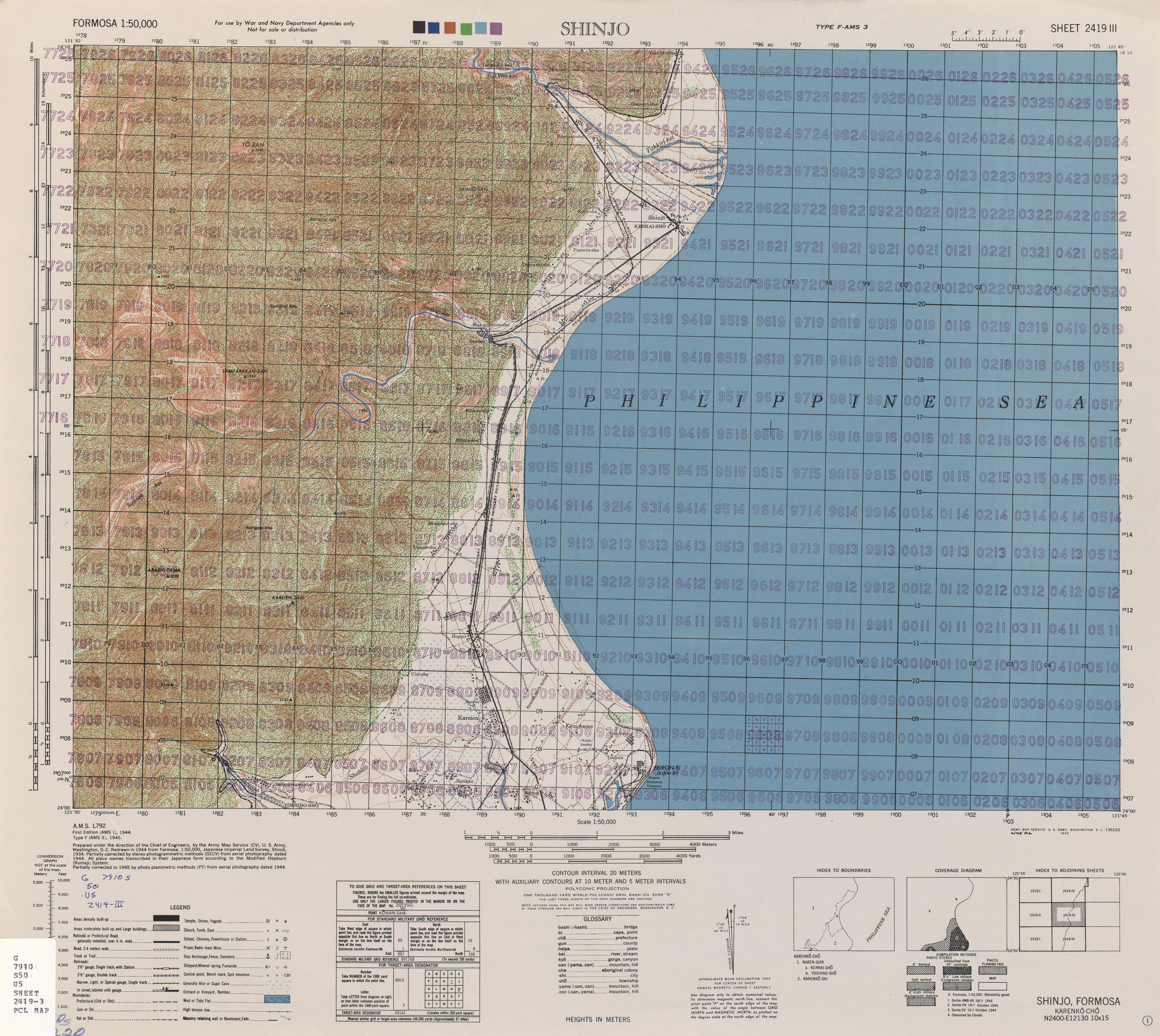
Map of Xincheng (labeled as Shinjō) and surrounding area (1944)

Formerly called Toloboan (Chinese: 哆囉滿; Pe̍h-ōe-jī: To-lô-boán).

== Administrative divisions ==
The township comprises eight villages: Beipu, Dahan, Jiali, Jialin, Jiaxin, Kangle, Shunan and Xincheng.

== Climate ==
- Subtropical monsoon and humid climate
- Average temperature: 22.5 °C (72.5 °F)
- Average precipitation: 2,200 mm (87 in)

== Economy ==
The township is home to the cement mining operated by Asia Cement Corporation and its cement plant.

== Education ==
- Dahan Institute of Technology

== Tourist attractions ==
- Qixingtan Beach
- Chihsing Tan Katsuo Museum
- Tzu Chi Jing She (Temple of Tzu Chi Foundation)
- Asia Cement Ecological Park

== Transportation ==
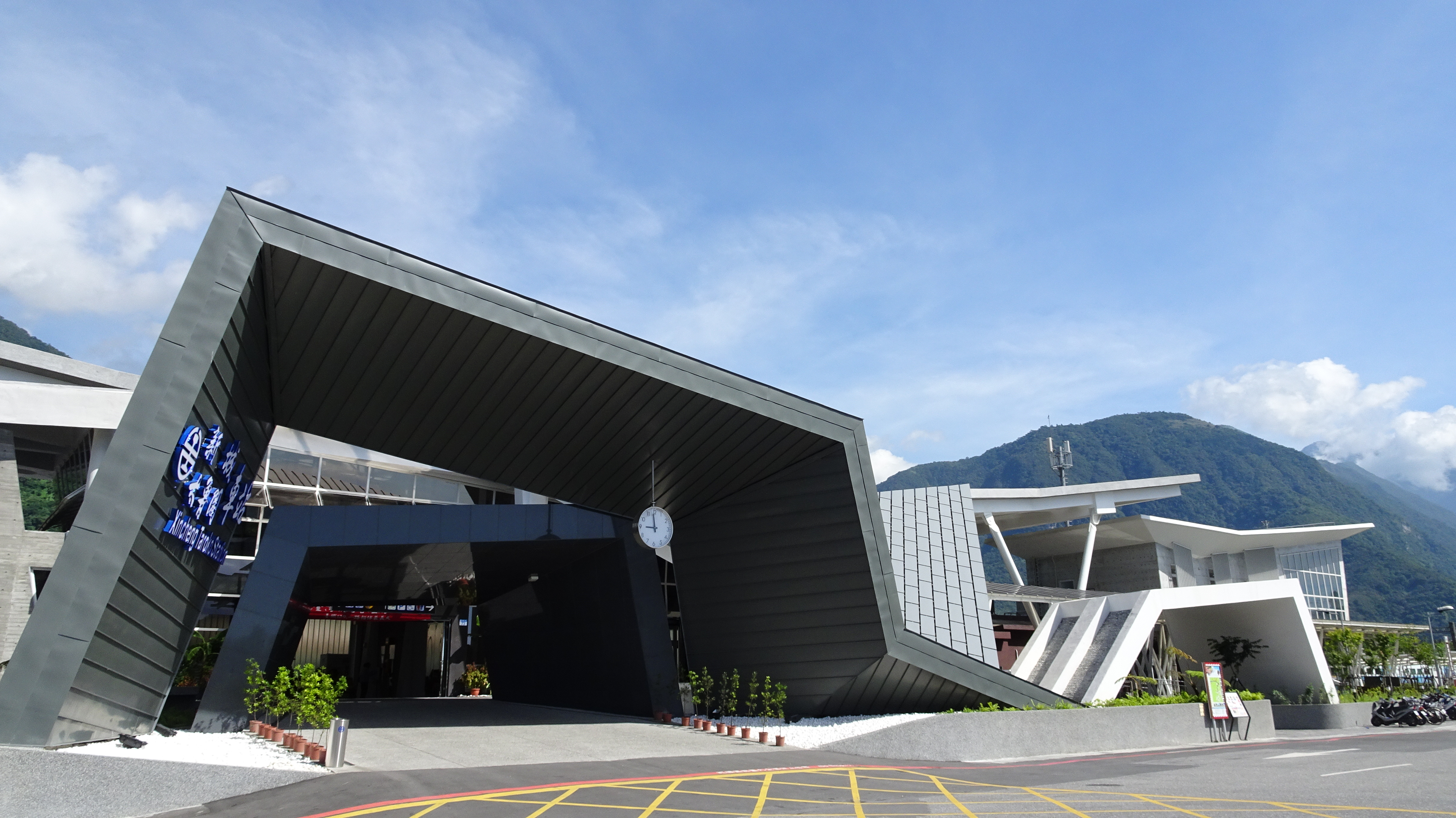
Sincheng (Taroko) Station

=== Air ===
- Hualien Airport

=== Rail ===
- TR Beipu Station (North-link line)
- TR Sincheng (Taroko) Station (North-link line)

=== Road ===
- Provincial Highway No.9
- County road No.193

== Notable natives ==
- Wang Shin-lung, Commander of the Republic of China Army
