= WuFeng University =

Private university in Chiayi, Taiwan

- 吳鳳科技大學
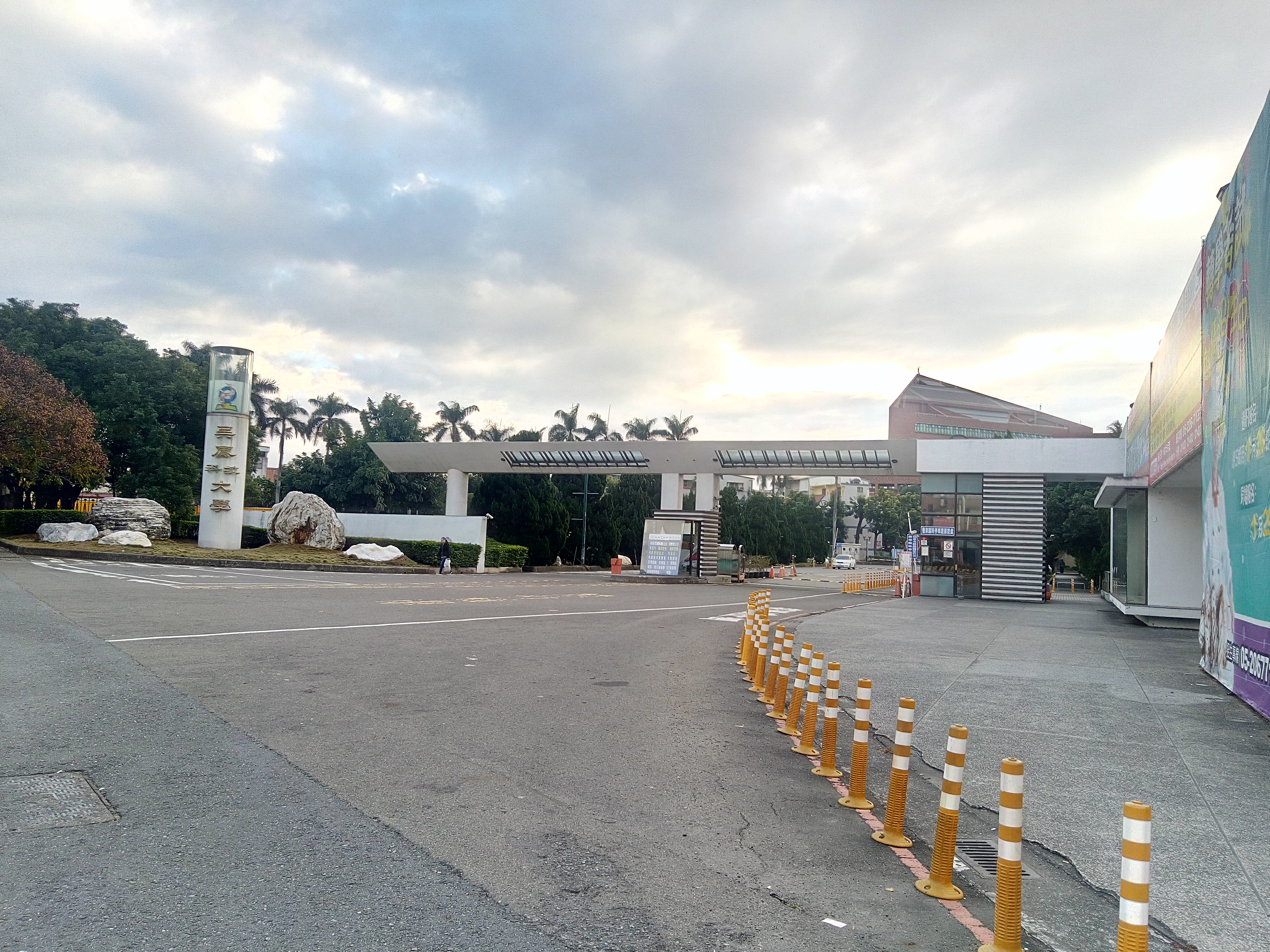
- Other names: WFU
- Former names: WuFeng Institute of Technology
- Type: Private
- Established: 1965
- Location: Minxiong, Chiayi County, Taiwan; 23°32′09.9″N 120°26′03.0″E
- Website: www.wfu.edu.tw

WuFeng University
- Traditional Chinese: 吳鳳科技大學
Transcriptions
Standard Mandarin
- Hanyu Pinyin: Wúfèng Kējìdàxué
Southern Min
- Hokkien POJ: Ngô͘-hōng Kho-ki Tāi-ha̍k

The WuFeng University (WFU; Chinese: 吳鳳科技大學; Pe̍h-ōe-jī: Ngô͘-hōng Kho-ki Tāi-ha̍k) is a private university of technology in Minxiong Township, Chiayi County, Taiwan with more than 6000 students.

WuFeng University offers undergraduate and graduate programs in a wide range of fields, including business, engineering, design, humanities, and social sciences. The university has six colleges: the College of Engineering, the College of Management, the College of Design, the College of Humanities, the College of Social Sciences, and the College of Law.

== History ==
The approval for the establishment of the university was issued in September 1963 for a business vocational school named Wufeng Business College. In October 1965, the school was approved for students admission named Private Wufeng Commercial College. In August 1969, it was renamed to Wufeng Industrial College and in August 2000 to Wufeng Technical College. In August 2010, it was finally renamed to Wu Feng University of Science and Technology and in October 2012 to Wufeng University Consortium Wufeng University of Science and Technology.

== Faculties ==
- College of Digital Entrepreneurship
- College of Safety and Engineering
- College of Tourism and Hospitality

== Transportation ==
The university is accessible within walking distance south of Minxiong Station of Taiwan Railway.

== See also ==
- List of universities in Taiwan
