= Minxiong =

Rural township in Chiayi County, Taiwan

Coordinates: 23.550399°N 120.445696°E

Minxiong Township 民雄鄉 Tamio
- Rural township
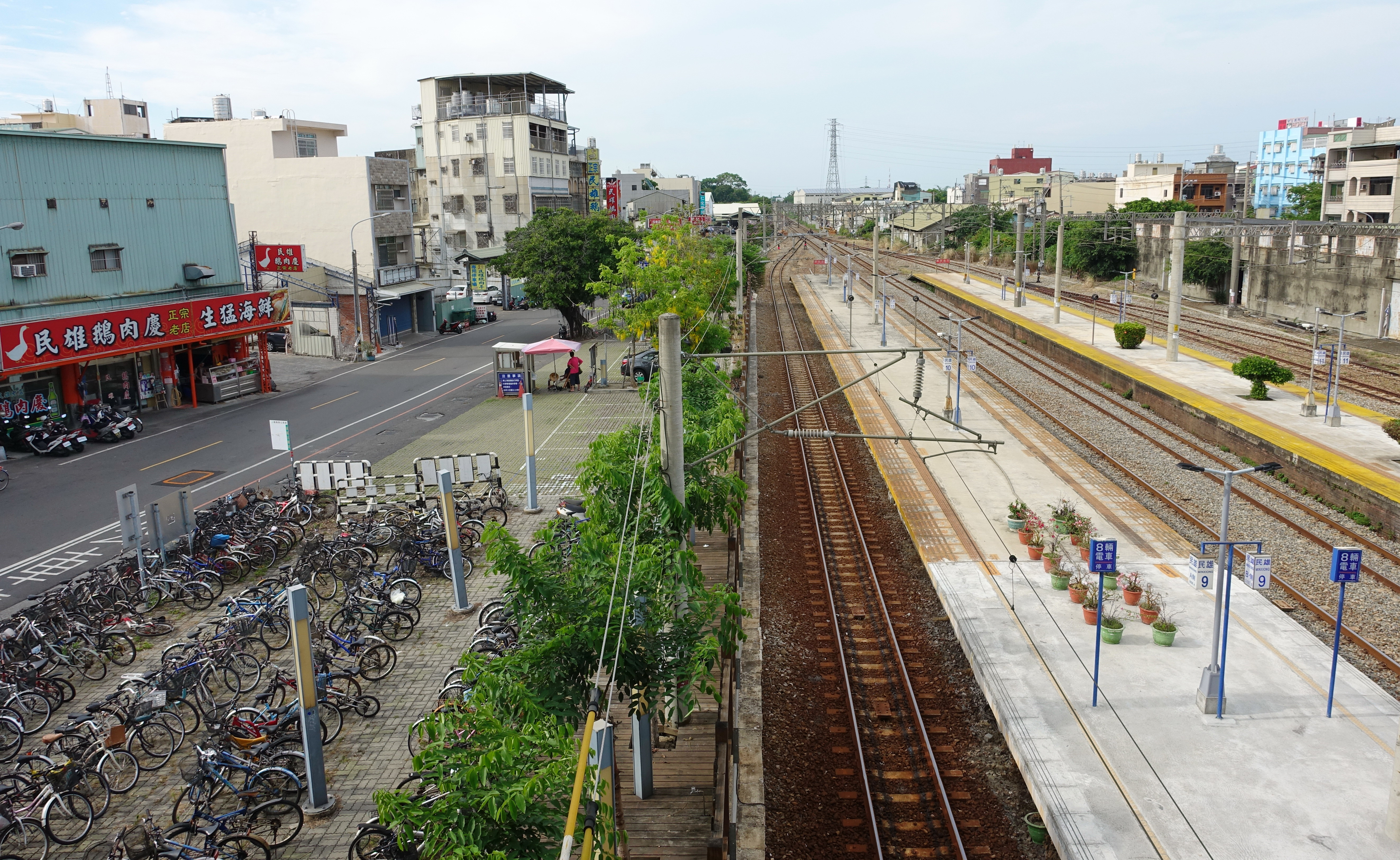

- 嘉義縣民雄鄉公所; Minsyong Township Office

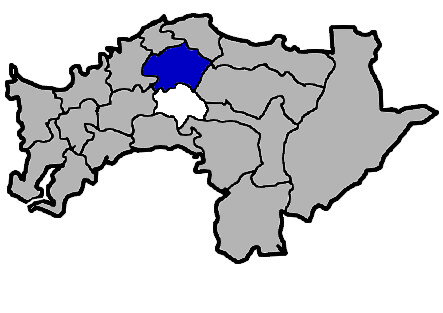
- Minxiong Township in Chiayi County
- Location: Chiayi County, Taiwan

Area
  - Land: 85 km^{2} (33 sq mi)

Population (May 2022)
  - Total: 70,316

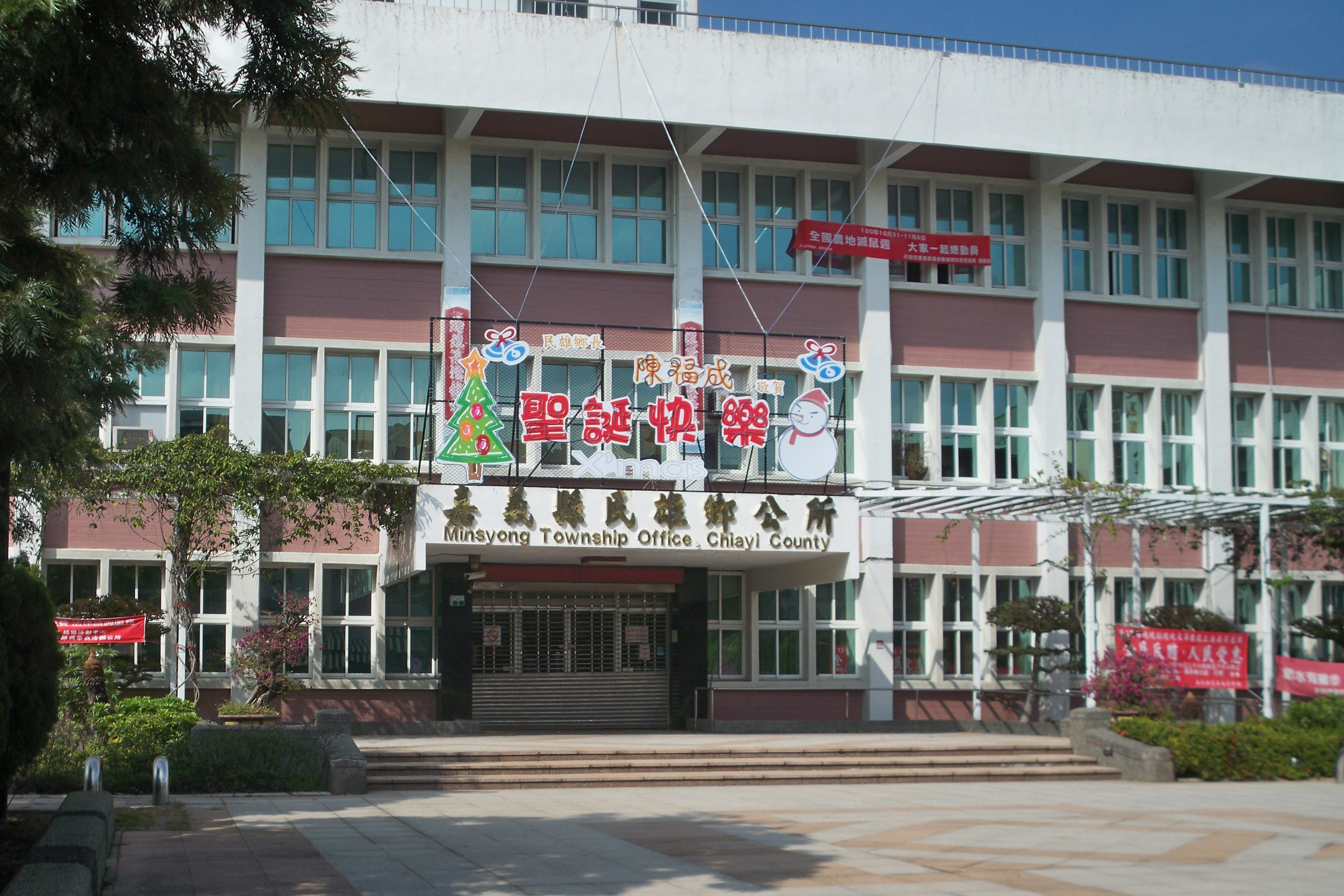
Minxiong Township Office

Minxiong Township (Chinese: 民雄鄉; pinyin: Mínxióng Xiāng) or Minsyong Township is a rural township in Chiayi County, Taiwan.

== Geography ==
The population of Minxiong Township is 70,316 (as of May 2022). It is the most populous district of Chiayi County. Minxiong Township consists of 28 villages with total area of 85.4969 km^{2}.

Mixiong Township is located on Chianan Plain with low hills in its eastern part. The climate is humid and hot.

== Administrative divisions ==
Tungrong, Zhongle, Xian, Liaoding, Fuquan, Tunghu, Dinglun, Jingpu, Zhonghe, Pinghe, Xichang, Lishou, Sanxing, Tungxing, Zengbei, Beidou, Shuangfu, Fule, Daqi, Xiulin, Songshan, Xingzhong, Xingnan, Jinxing, Fuxing, Wenlong, Shanzhong and Zhongyang Village.

== Education ==
- National Chiayi University - Minxiong Campus
- National Chung Cheng University
- WuFeng University

== Infrastructure ==
- Chiahui Power Plant

== Tourist attractions ==
- Alcohol Cultural Relics Museum
- Baolin Temple
- Chiayi Performing Arts Center
- Dashihye Temple
- Liou's Ancient House
- National Radio Museum

== Transportation ==
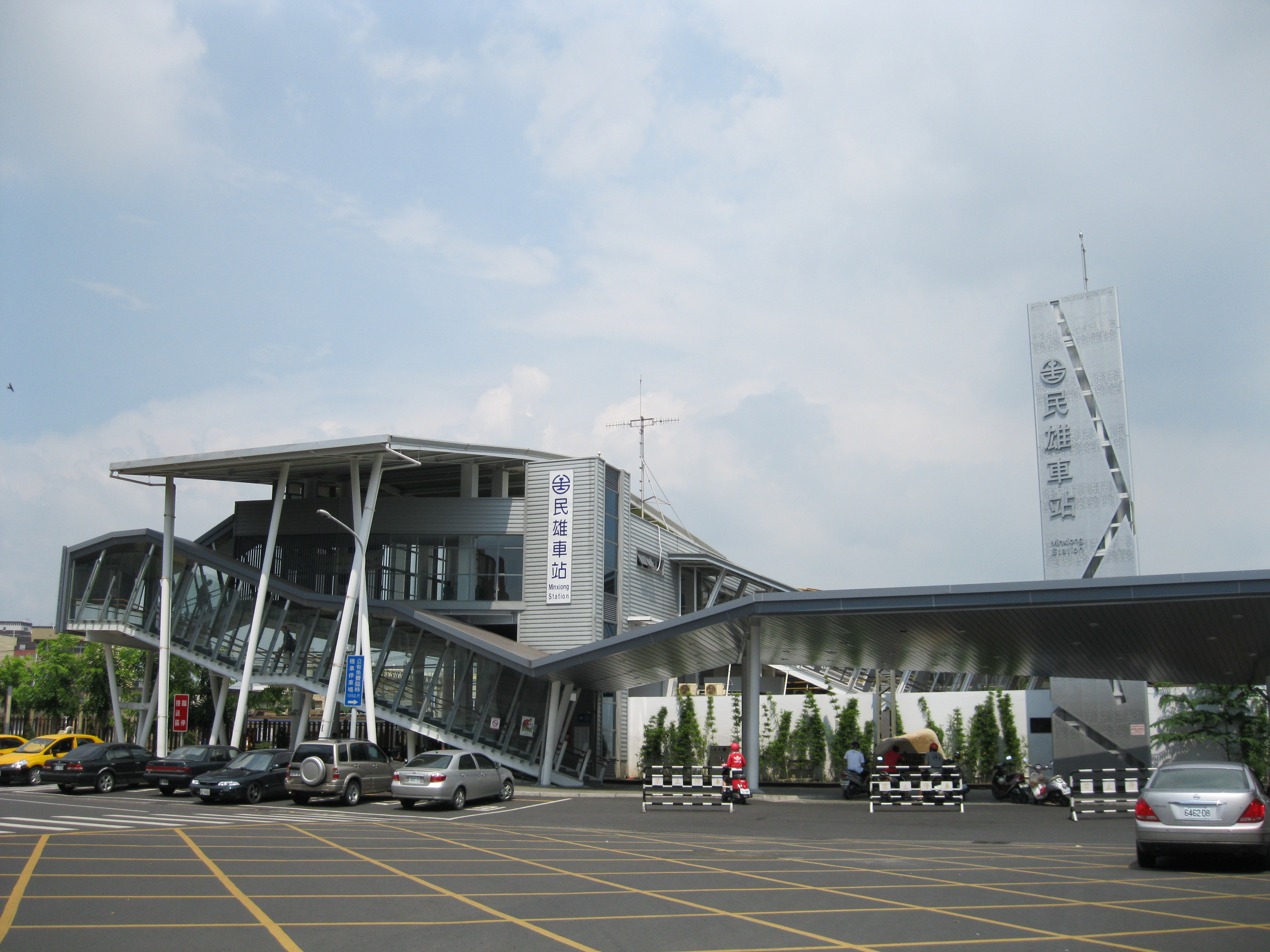
Minxiong Station

- TR Minxiong Station

== Notable natives ==
- Huang Chu-wen, Minister of Interior (1998-2000)
- Ho Ming-teh, engineer
