= Asia Cement Corporation =

Cement company of Taiwan

Asia Cement Corporation 亞洲水泥股份有限公司
- Industry: cement
- Founded: 21 March 1957
- Headquarters: Da'an, Taipei, Taiwan
- Website: Official website

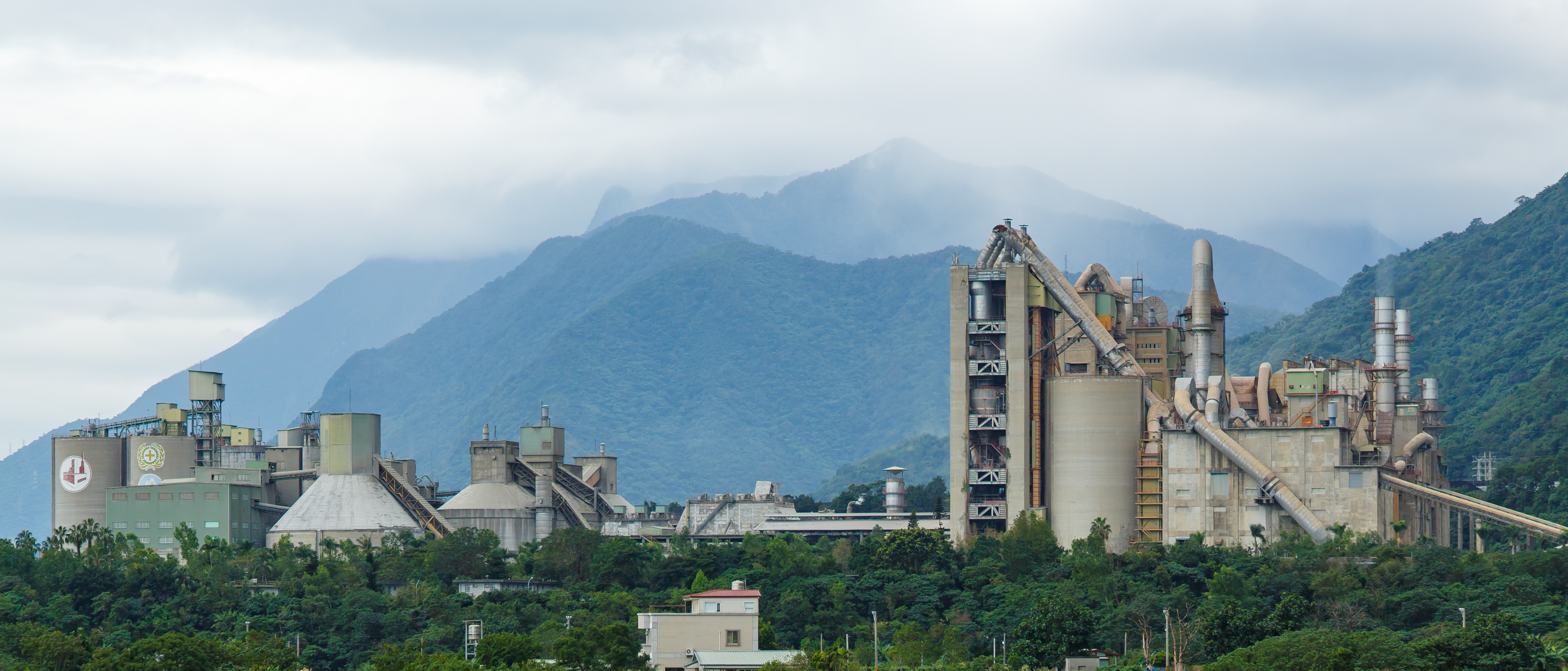
Asia Cement Corporation, Hualien Plant

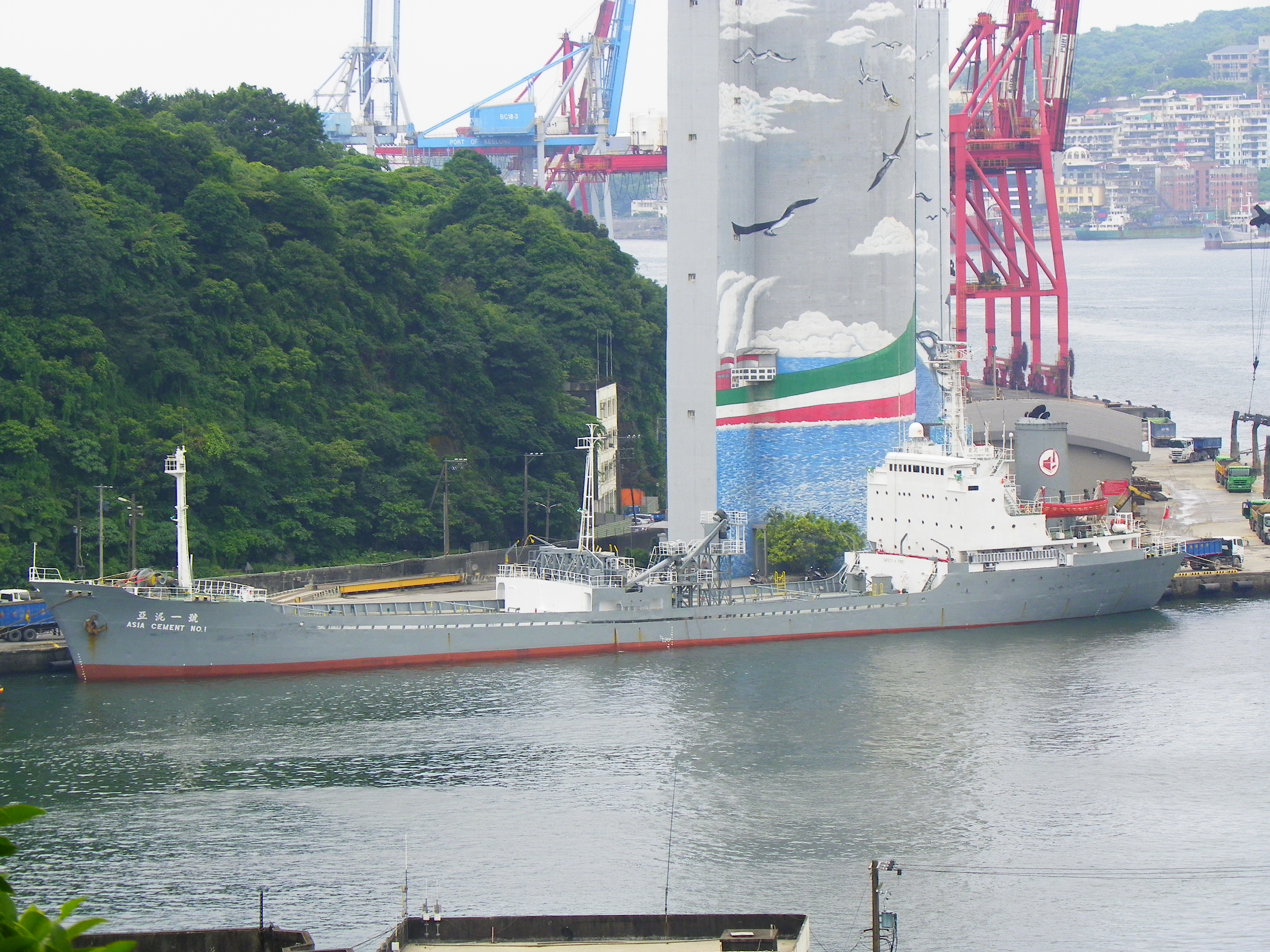
ACC ship at Port of Keelung

The Asia Cement Corporation (ACC; Chinese: 亞洲水泥股份有限公司; pinyin: Yàzhōu Shuǐní Gǔfèn Yǒuxiàn Gōngsī) is a Taiwanese cement company headquartered in Taipei.

== History ==
ACC was founded on 21 March 1957.

== Cement plants ==
- Hsinchu Plant at Hengshan Township, Hsinchu County
- Hualien Plant at Xincheng Township, Hualien County

== Transportation ==
The company headquarter is accessible within walking distance North West from Liuzhangli Station of Taipei Metro.

== See also ==
- List of companies of Taiwan
