= Dounan =

Dounan may refer to:

- Dounan, Chenggong District, Kunming, China; location of Dounan Flower Market
- Dounan, Yunlin, transport centre for Yunlin County, Taiwan
- Dounan Station, Yunlin County, Taiwan
