= Factory tour =

Visit to observe manufacturing

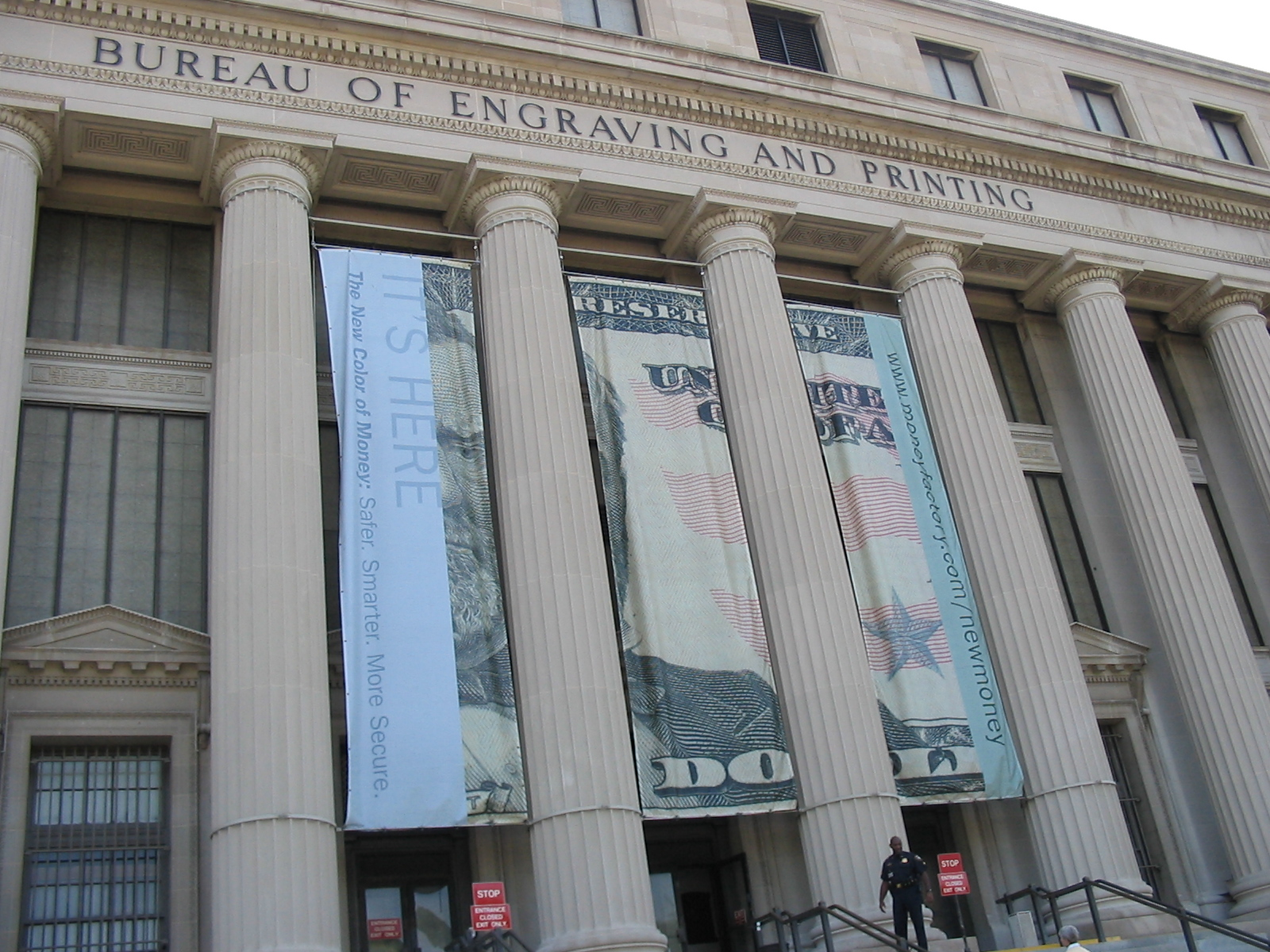
Bureau of Engraving and Printing

A factory tour is an organized visit to a factory to observe the products being manufactured and the processes at work. Manufacturing companies offer factory tours to improve public relations.

== Types of factory tours ==
Breweries and distilleries, together with manufacturers of clothes, pottery and glass, are amongst the most popular factory visits. The popularity of factory tours has declined since the mid-20th century, as factories no longer represent the cutting edge of technology.

Government agencies such as NASA and ESA, and companies like Boeing still continue their public tours of their factories, spacecraft workshops and visitor areas, either directly or through a sponsorship company.

Some countries have set up industrial-related museums where tours to see their processing is part of the museum attractions, such as the BRAND'S Health Museum, Château De Jourdeness, Taiwan Metal Creation Museum, Taiwan Mochi Museum and Taiyen Tongxiao Tourism Factory in Taiwan.
