= Dalin, Chiayi =

Urban township in Chiayi County, Taiwan

Coordinates: 23°35′56″N 120°28′12″E

Dalin Township 大林鎮 Tairin
- Urban township
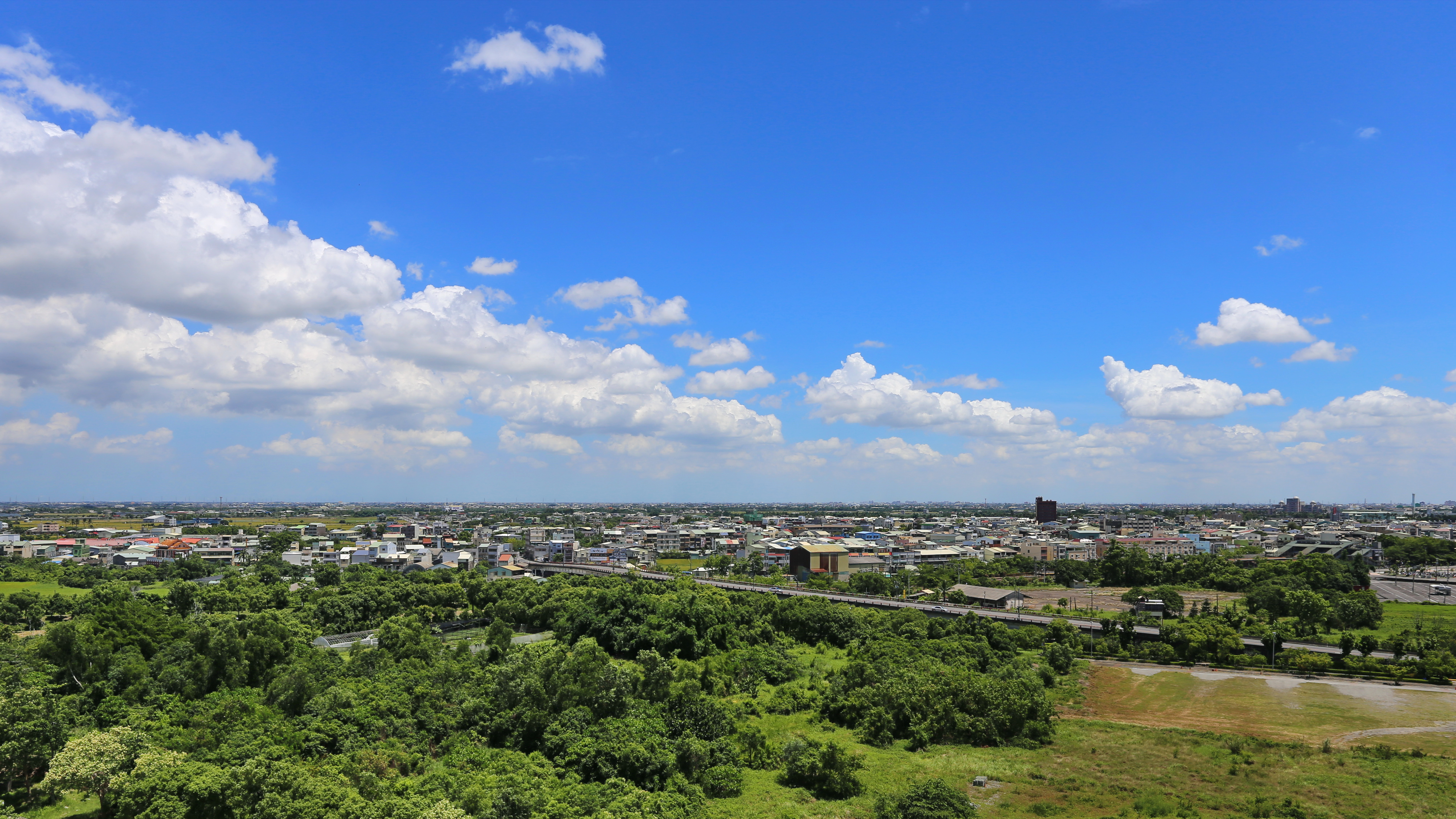

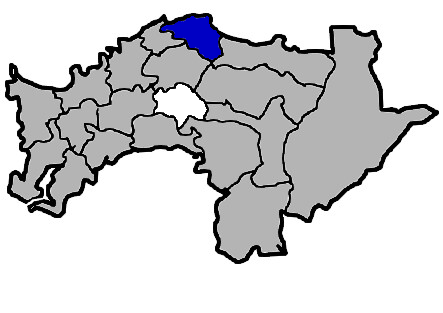
- Dalin Township in Chiayi County
- Location: Chiayi County, Taiwan

Area
  - Total: 64 km^{2} (25 sq mi)

Population (May 2022)
  - Total: 29,937
  - Density: 470/km^{2} (1,200/sq mi)
- Website: dalin.cyhg.gov.tw

Dalin Township (Chinese: 大林鎮; pinyin: Dàlín Zhèn; Pe̍h-ōe-jī: Tōa-nâ) is an urban township in Chiayi County, Taiwan. To the east is Meishan, to the south Minxiong and to the north Yunlin County. Dalin TzuChi General Hospital (大林慈濟醫院) is located here.

== History ==
The township was formerly known as Dapulin since the Qing empire rule. The first name who came to this area was a Cantonese person. Afterwards, many Chinese immigrated to the area from Guangdong, China and Fujian, China. Most of them worked in the forest. During the Japanese rule, the government set up a sugar factory in the area.

== Demographics ==
It has a population of 29,937 in 11,505 households.

== Administrative divisions ==
The township comprises 21 villages: Damei, Datang, Goubei, Guoxi, Hubei, Jilin, Minghe, Minghua, Neilin, Pailu, Pinglin, Sancun, Sanhe, Sanjiao, Shanglin, Tunglin, Xijie, Xilin, Yihe, Zhongkeng and Zhonglin.

== Economy ==
There are in total about 2,600 hectares of farmland in the township. Agriculture produce in the township are rice, bamboo shoots, oranges, tangerines, pineapples and orchids. The total annual food production is 12,000 tons.

The development of Dapumei industrial area has attracted corporations such as Canon to build factories.

== Education ==
- Nanhua University
- Chung Jen Junior College of Nursing, Health Science and Management
- Chiayi County Tungji high school

== Transportation ==
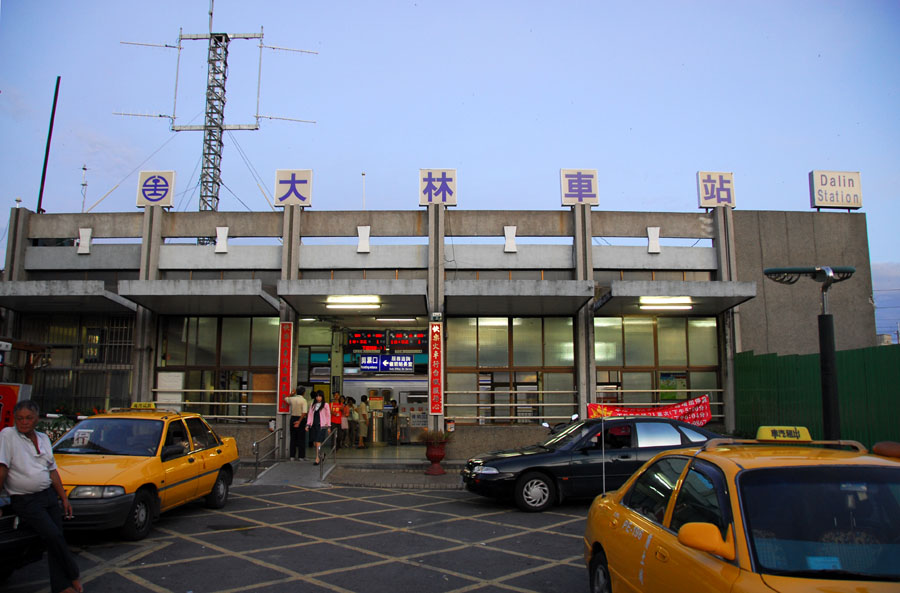
Dalin Station

Taiwan Railway has one station named Dalin Station in the township. The Mianchiuag Taiwan Sugar Railways maintains a "Dalin Station."

== Tourism ==
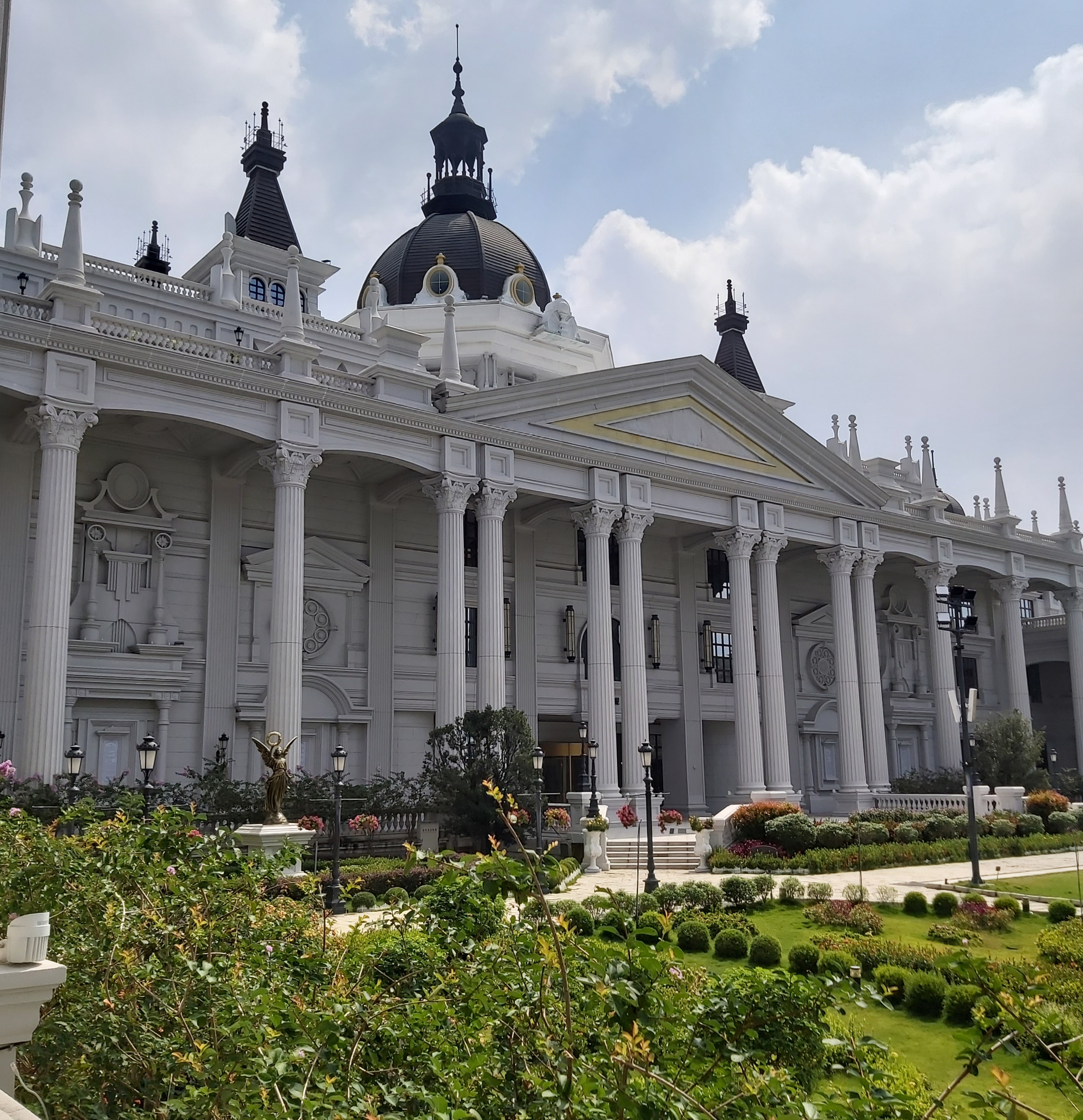
Château De Jourdeness

- Château De Jourdeness

== Notable natives ==
- Chester Chou, Deputy Secretary-General of the Legislative Yuan (1999-2014)
- Hsu Nai-lin, TV host, actor, and singer
- Sylvia Chang, actress, writer, singer, producer and director
