= Honey Museum =

Museum in Gukeng, Yunlin, Taiwan

- 蜜蜂故事館
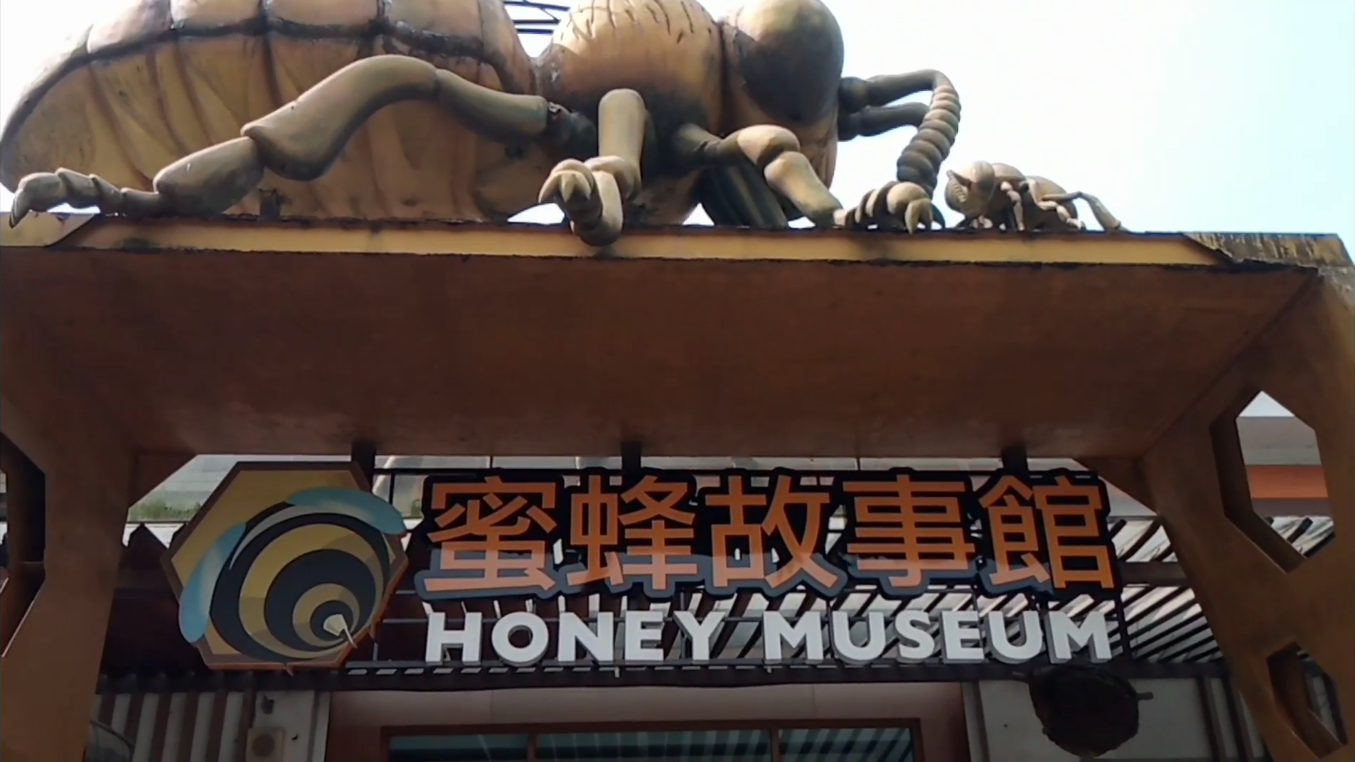
- Established: 2006
- Location: Gukeng, Yunlin, Taiwan
- Coordinates: 23°39′32″N 120°32′27″E
- Type: museum
- Website: Official website (in Chinese)

The Honey Museum (traditional Chinese: 蜜蜂故事館; simplified Chinese: 蜜蜂故事馆; pinyin: Mìfēng Gùshì Guǎn) is a museum about honey and bees in Gukeng Township, Yunlin County, Taiwan.

== History ==
The museum establishment was originated in 2005 when the owner of a bee farm in the area opened a honey shop. In 2006, the Honey Museum was established.

== Architecture ==
The entrance to the museum is through a green tunnel with a giant bee model above it. The museum has a large field area for children to play in.

== Activities ==
The museum provides the following activities:

- Honey tasting
- Do-it-yourself honey making
- Talks on honey manufacturing and its products
- Sell honey, royal jelly, pollen, propolis.

== Transportation ==
The museum is accessible by bus towards Meshan from Dounan Station of Taiwan Railway.

== See also ==
- List of museums in Taiwan
