= Dalin railway station =

Railway station in Dalin, Chiayi, Taiwan

Dalin Station 大林車站
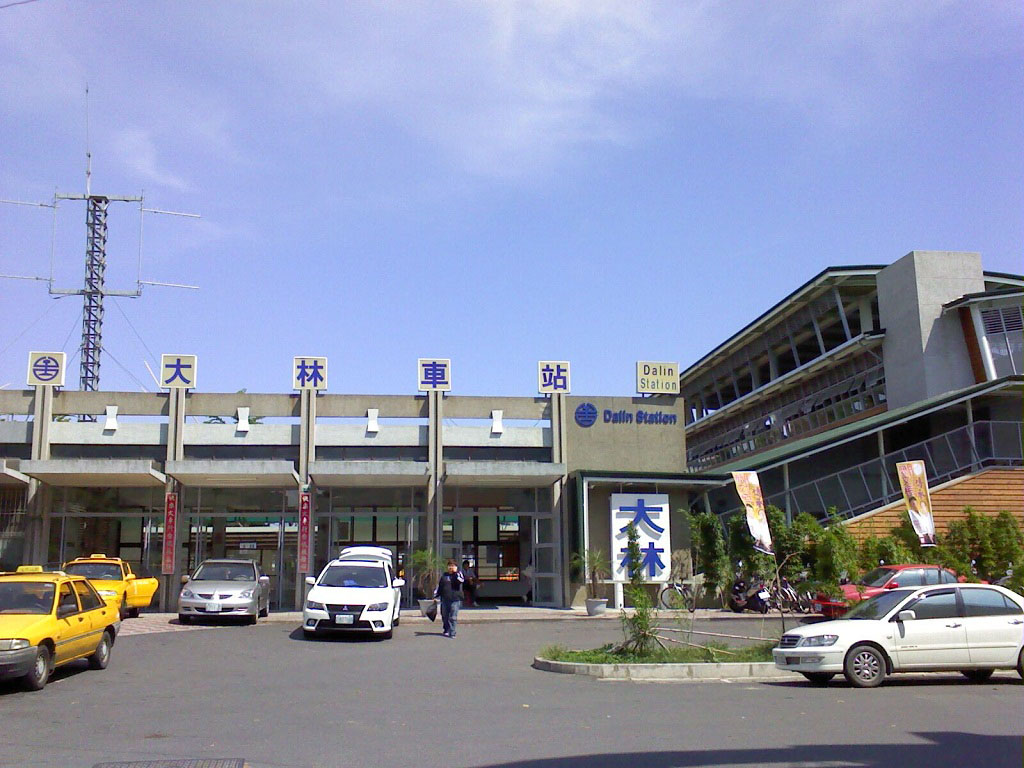

General information
- Location: Dalin, Chiayi County, Taiwan
- Coordinates: 23°36′4.0″N 120°27′20.6″E
- Owner: Taiwan Railway Corporation
- Operator: Taiwan Railway Corporation
- Line: Western Trunk line
- Train operators: Taiwan Railway Corporation

History
- Opened: 15 December 1903

Passengers
- 3,366 daily (2024)
Location

Dalin (Chinese: 大林車站; pinyin: Dàlín Chēzhàn) is a railway station on the Taiwan Railway West Coast line located in Dalin Township, Chiayi County, Taiwan.

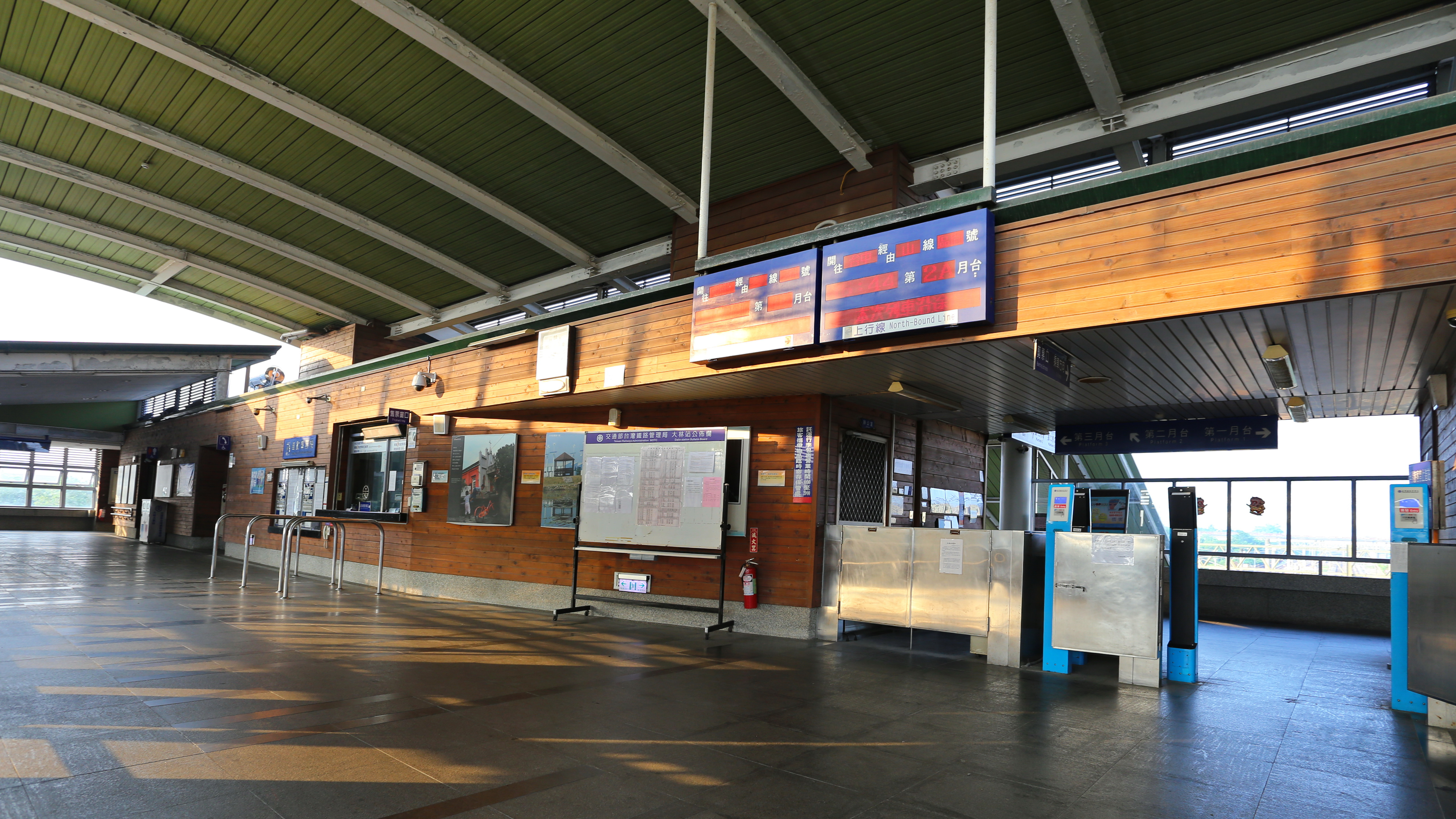
Ticket hall of the Dalin station

== See also ==
- List of railway stations in Taiwan

Preceding station	Taiwan Railway	Following station
Shigui towards Keelung	Western Trunk line	Minxiong towards Pingtung
