= Shigui railway station =

Railway station in Yunlin, Taiwan

Shihguei Station 石龜車站
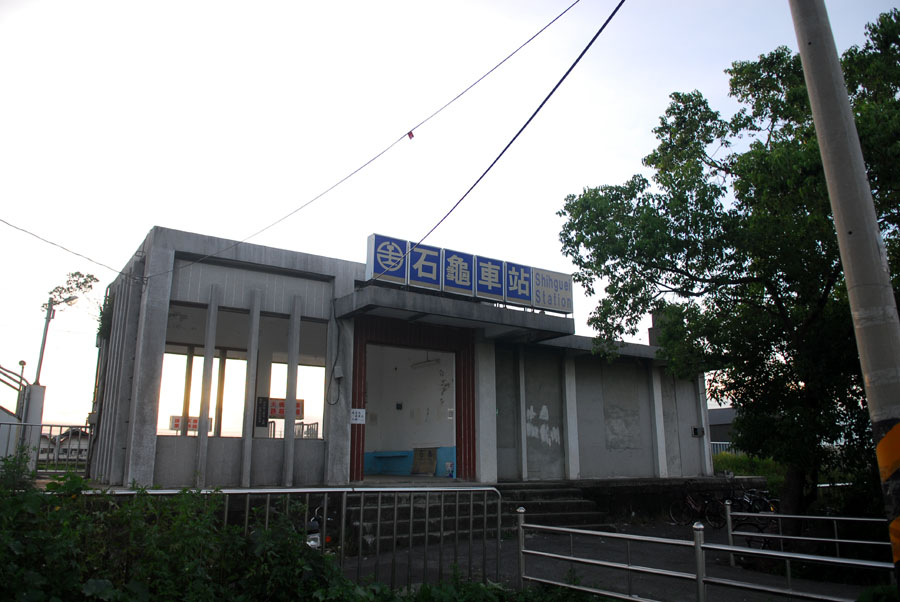

General information
- Location: Dounan, Yunlin County, Taiwan
- Coordinates: 23°38′22.5″N 120°28′15.6″E
- System: Train station
- Owner: Taiwan Railway Corporation
- Operator: Taiwan Railway Corporation
- Line: Western Trunk line
- Train operators: Taiwan Railway Corporation

History
- Opened: 24 October 1958

Passengers
- 279 daily (2024)
Location

Shigui (Chinese: 石龜車站; Hanyu Pinyin: Shíguī Chēzhàn; Tongyong Pinyin: Shíhguēi Chejhàn) is a railway station on the Taiwan Railway West Coast line located in Dounan Township, Yunlin County, Taiwan.

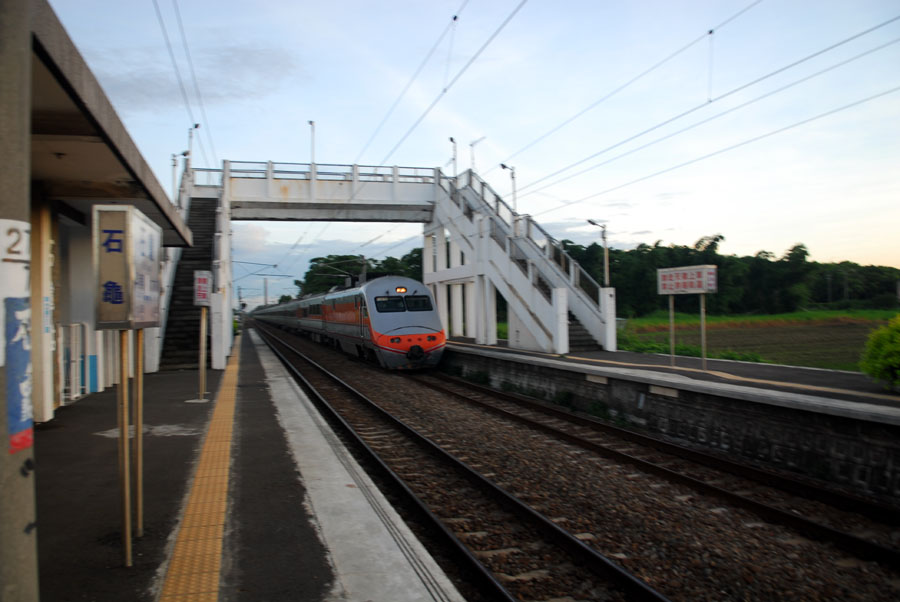
Shihguei station platform

== History ==
The station opened on 24 October 1958.

== See also ==
- List of railway stations in Taiwan

Preceding station	Taiwan Railway	Following station
Dounan towards Keelung	Western Trunk line	Dalin towards Pingtung
