= Château de Jourdeness =

- 佐登妮絲城堡
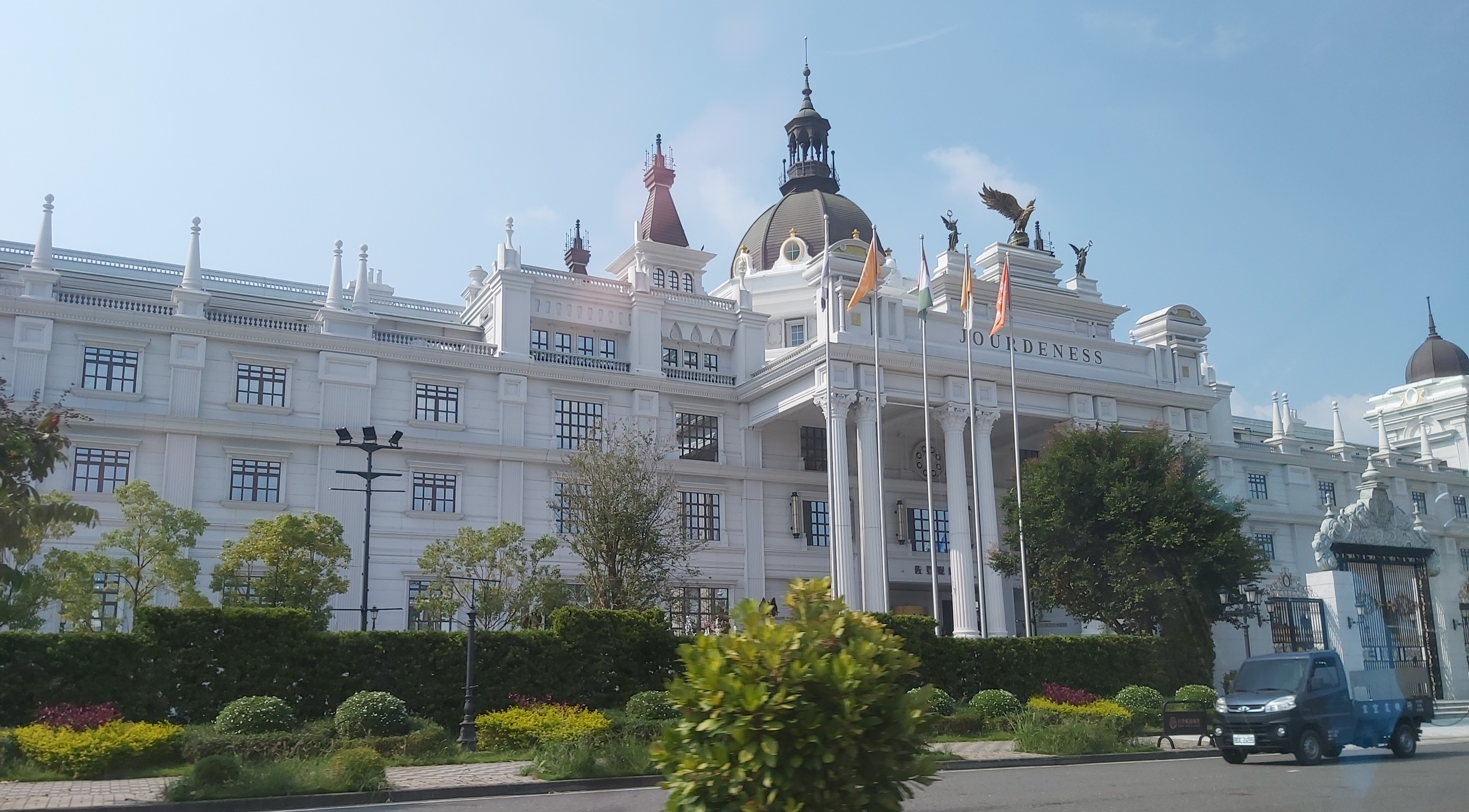
- Château De Jourdeness, photographed in 2024
- Interactive map of the Château de Jourdeness area

General information
- Architectural style: Baroque
- Location: No. 15, 3rd Road, Meiyuan District, Dapu District, 22, Zhongkengli, Dalin Town, Chiayi County, Taiwan
- Coordinates: 23.5844°N 120.5071°E
- Construction started: 9 May, 2019
- Completed: 1 October, 2022
- Cost: 3 Billion TWD
- Client: Lee Ming Construction
- Owner: Bio-Jourdeness International Group Co., Ltd.

Technical details
- Structural system: Glass fiber reinforced concrete

Design and construction
- Architect: 劉哲揚

Château de Jourdeness (Chinese: 佐登妮絲城堡), officially named Jourdeness Dapumei Biotech Park (Chinese: 佐登妮絲大埔美生技園區), is a biotechnology plant and a tourist attraction in Dalin, Taiwan, owned by Bio-Jourdeness International Group Co., Ltd. (Chinese: 佐登妮絲國際股份有限公司). The company established the factory in 2015 for TWD 3 billion. It is the largest beauty biotechnology plant in Asia-Pacific region.

== Overview ==
The entire plant covers an area of 50,000 square metres, containing smart manufacturing, a research and development centre, a green building, stores, and a European garden. Château De Jourdeness, the castle part of the plant, occupies a 12,954 ping (approximately 41,600 square metres) area, with a 2,481 ping (approximately 8,200 square metres) main building. The building's style is primarily Baroque, incorporating some elements of the Renaissance aspects.

The building's main material is glass fibre reinforced cement, with sculptures made of fibre reinforced plastic. Its 50-metre-high copper dome combines geometric patterns with Baroque and Art Nouveau designs. The architectural lines are accentuated by natural sunlight. Beneath the dome, a fragrance created by a century-old French perfume manufacturer is released.

The plant features two 15-metre-wide fountains and an 8,000 ping (approximately 26,500 square metres) European-style garden. The surroundings are enclosed by a 250-metre stretch of 500 baldcypress trees. A 200-metre-long, 14-metre-high art corridor forms a "ㄇ"-shaped structure around the castle, with columns composed of the Doric, Ionic, and Corinthian orders. The plant also features 19 photo-op spots, Kris Bald Cypress Forest, Miller Gazebo, pools, and various shops and restaurants. In the main building, there is an immersive theatre, a DIY classroom, and 12 international-standard laboratories, including a fragrance laboratory, a P2 biosafety laboratory, a stability laboratory, a biotechnology laboratory, and a vacuum sublimation laboratory. Chen Chia-Chi (Chinese: 陳佳琦), manager of the Jourdeness Group, stated that the production capacity of the plant's R&D centre is 5~10 times greater than the old Dajia factory.

== History ==
Chen Cheng-hsiung (Chinese: 陳正雄) established the Jourdeness group at Taichung in 1989. It primarily operates in beauty spa services and skin care retail. The company expanded their business to China and Malaysia. In 2015, when Jourdeness listed in Taipei Exchange, the company found that the old factory in Dajia District was insufficient for its business. Jourdeness therefore bought 50,000 square metres of land in Dapumei Precision Machinery Technology Park in Chiayi with 500 million TWD to build a new factory. On 25 September, 2016, Jourdeness Dapumei Biotech Park started construction. In 2017, Chen Chia-Chi (Chinese: 陳佳琦), daughter of Chen Cheng-hsiung, succeeded as the company's manager and began operating cosmetics retail and aesthetic medicine services. In 2019, after a four-year plan, Château De Jourdeness began construction. The structure is designed by Liu Ze-Yang (Chinese: 劉哲揚) of Ton Horizon Design (Chinese: 宇揚設計), an architect who lived abroad in Vienna for years. The construction finished on 1 October 2022 and started operating on 1 November 2022. The first manager of Château De Jourdeness is Chen Chun-An (Chinese: 陳春安).

== Gallery ==
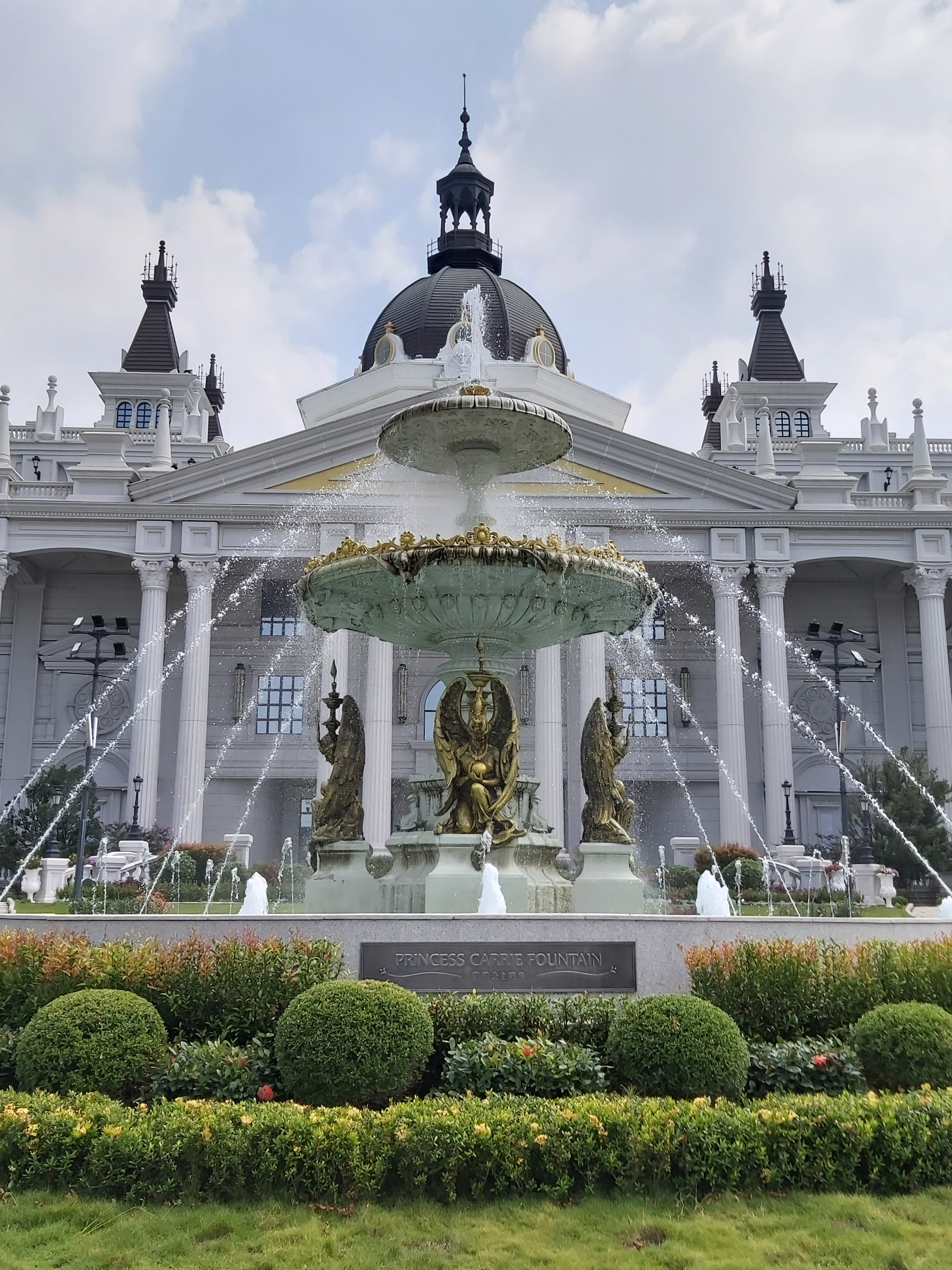
Princess Carrie Fountain

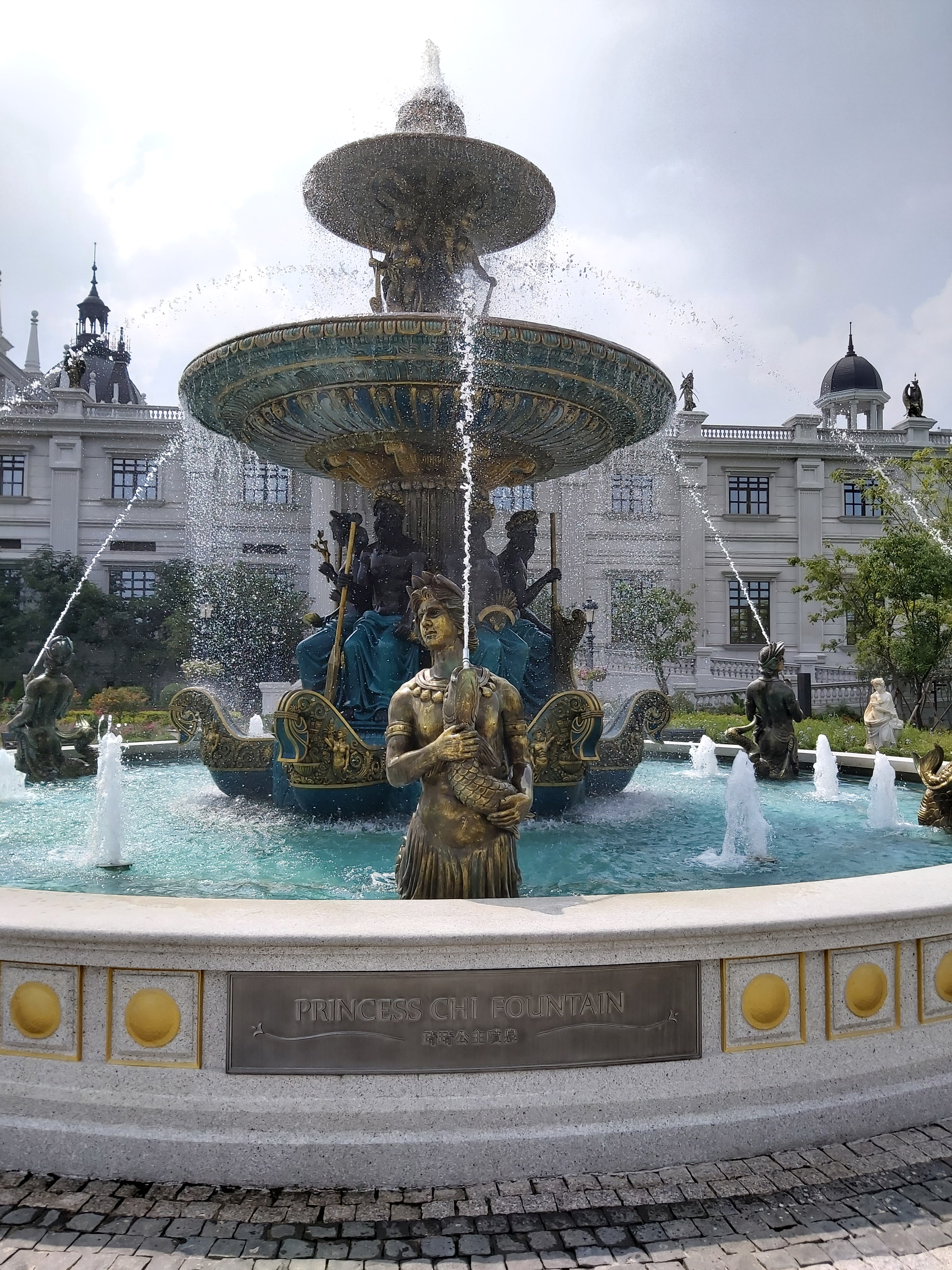
Princess Chi Fountain

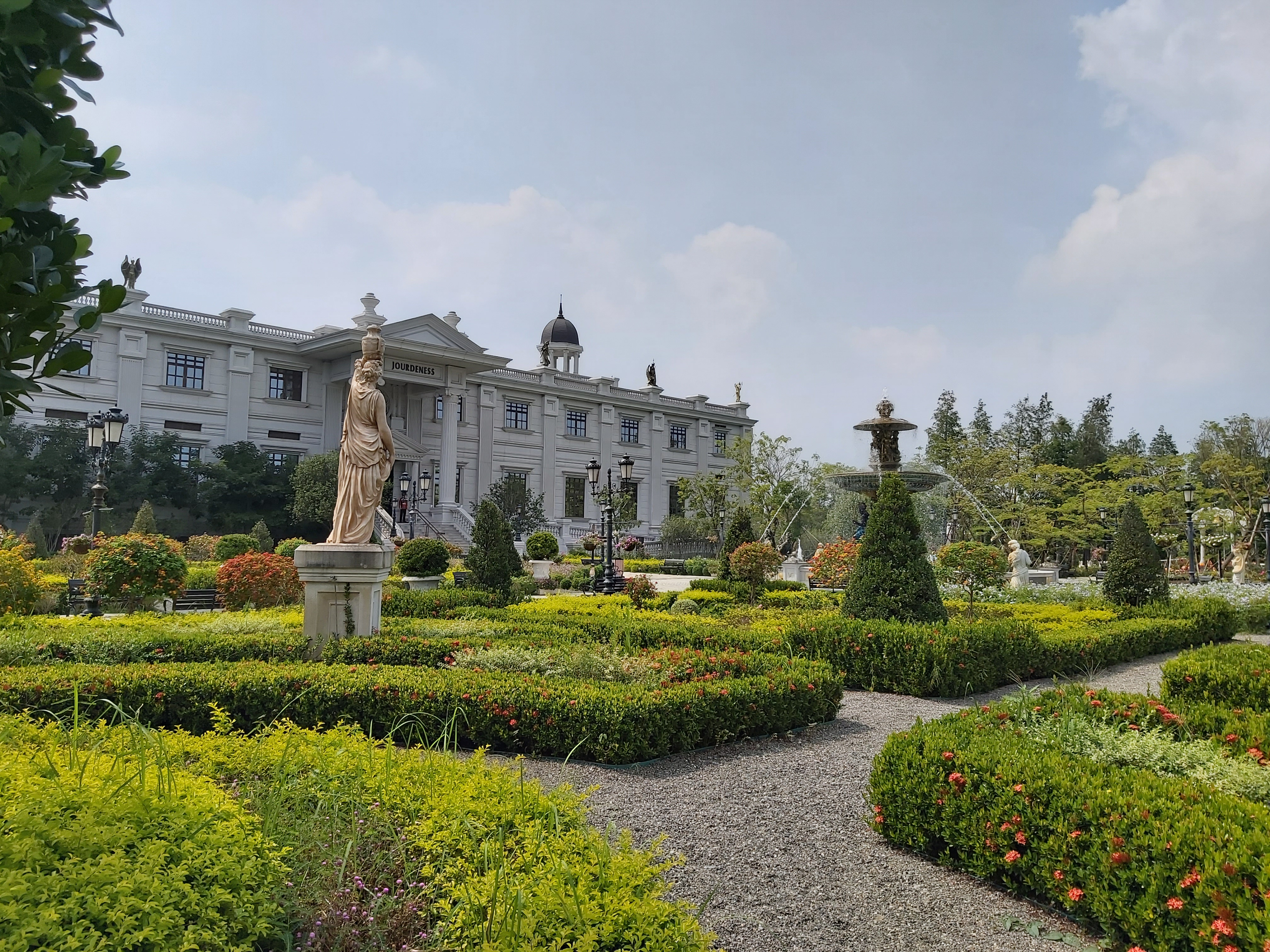
Princess Niece Garden

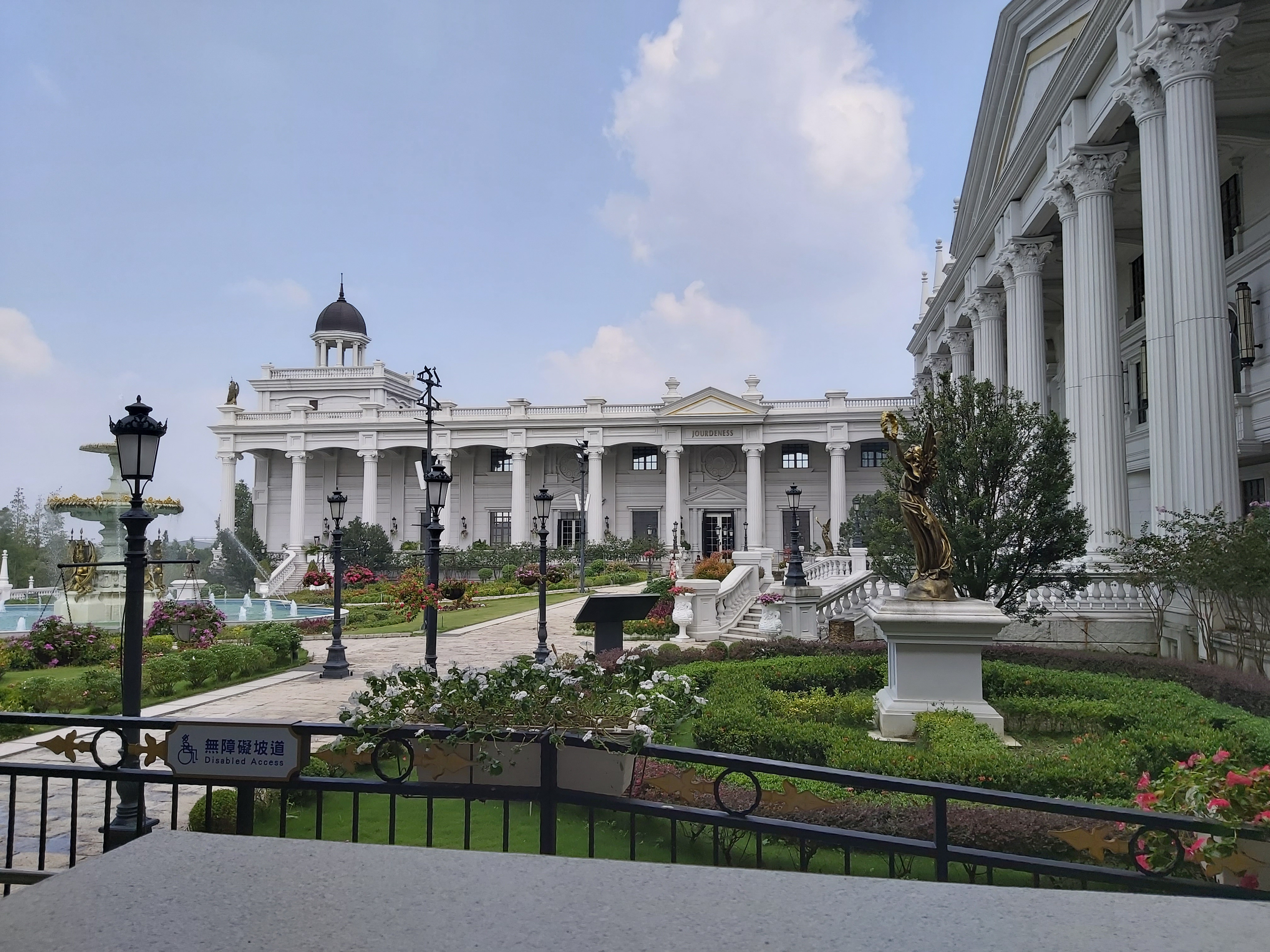
Brian Garden Square

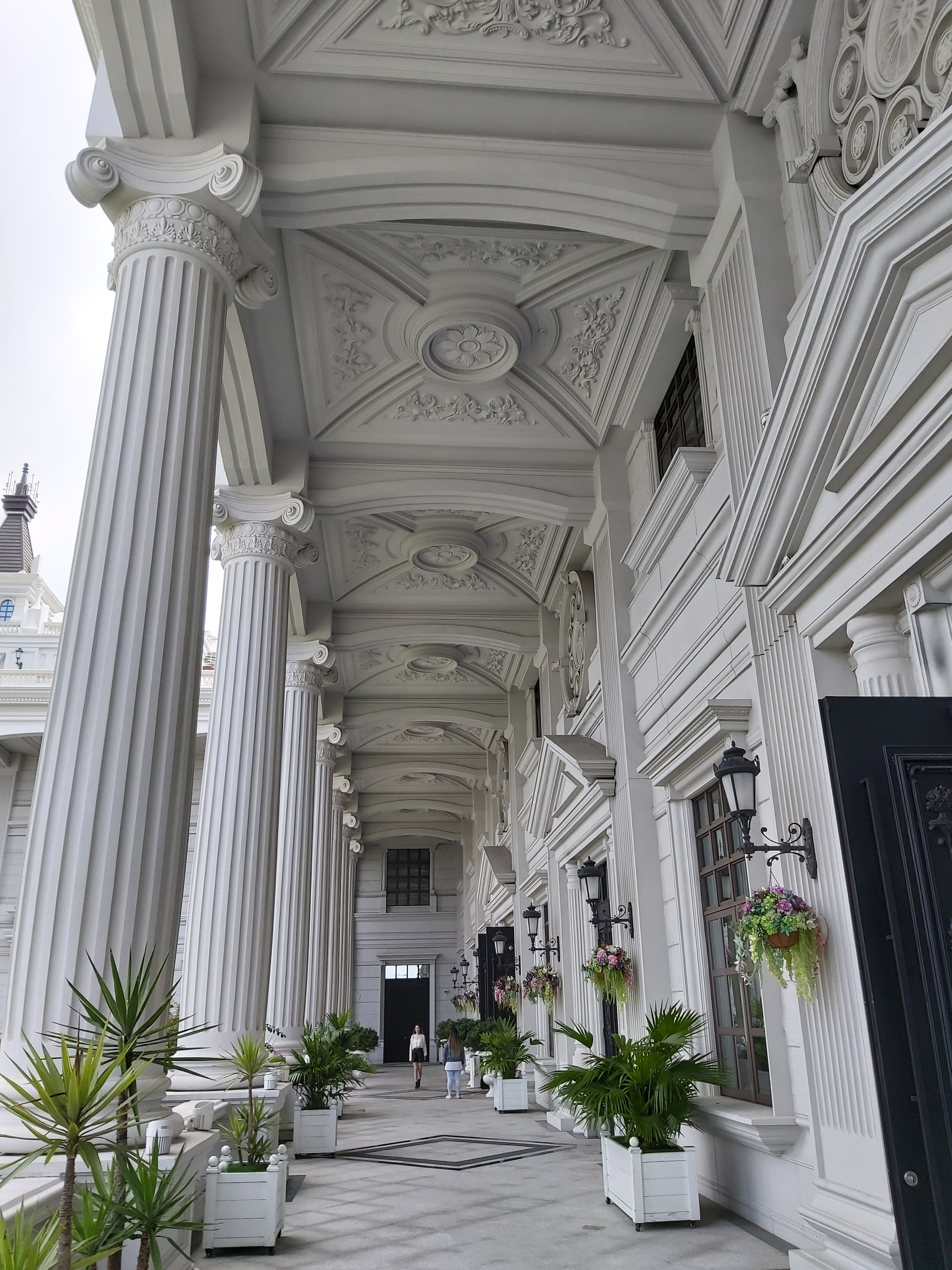
Art Corridor

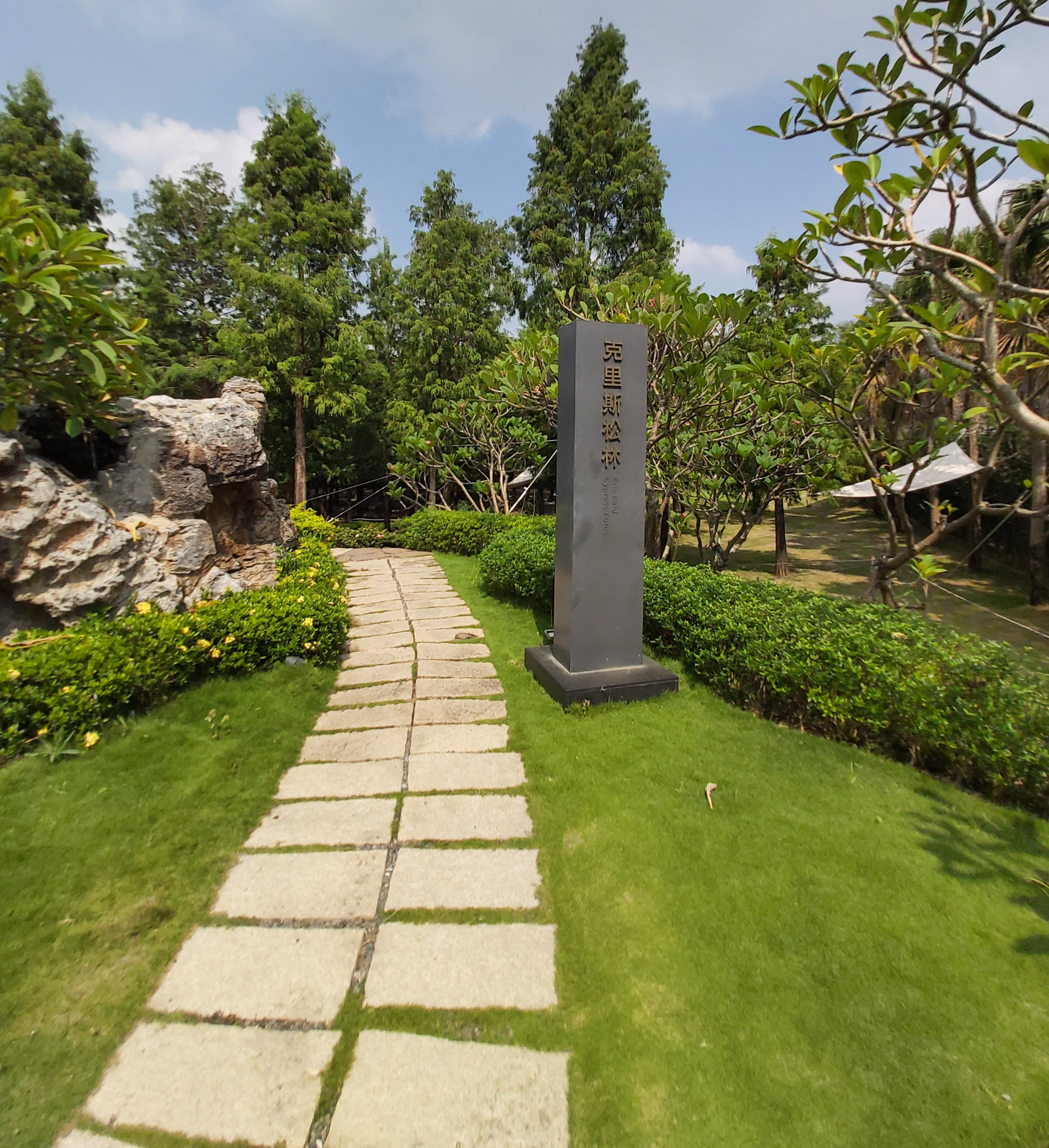
Kris Bald Cypress Forest

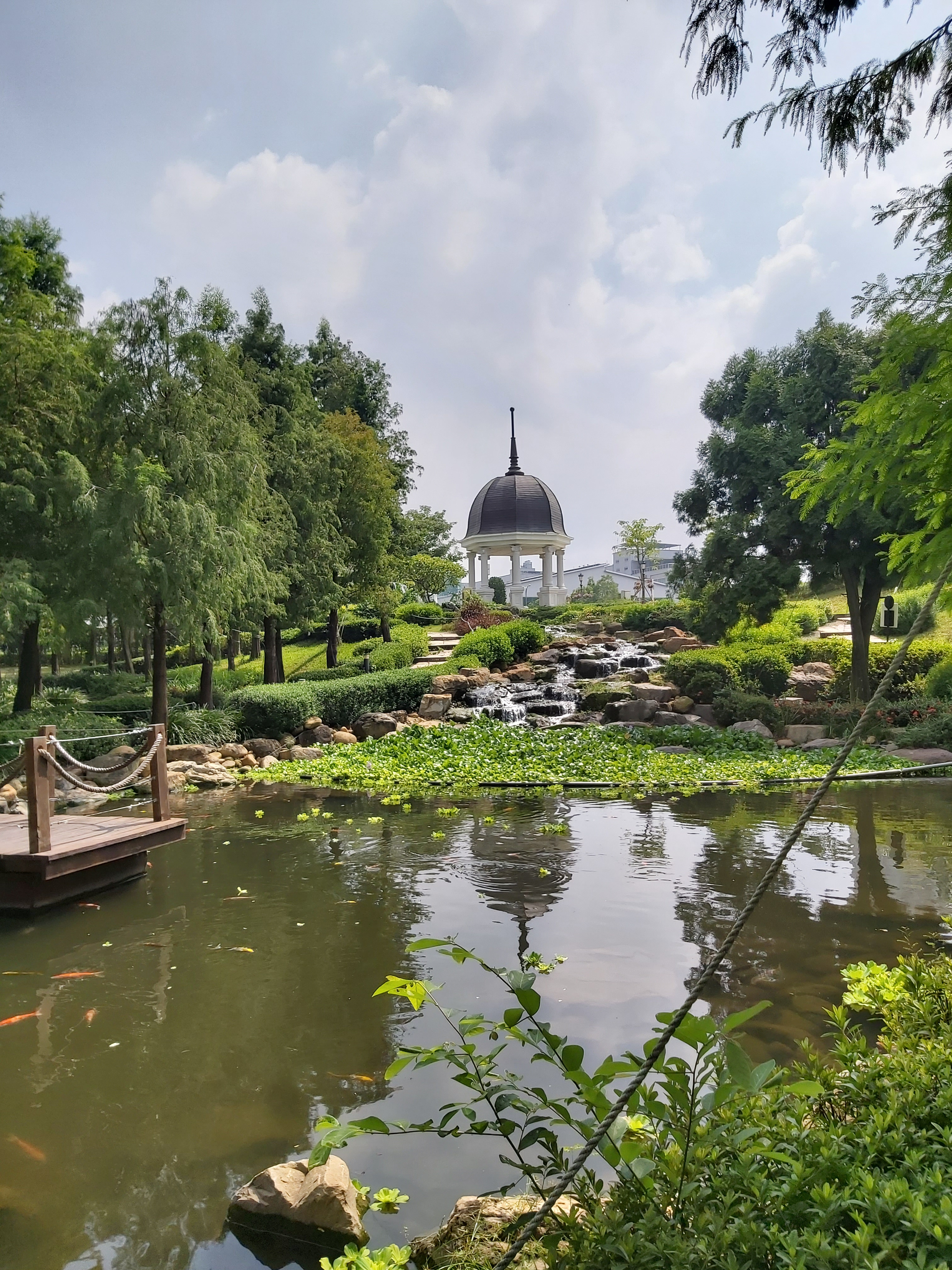
Miller Gazebo and Shizuka Pond

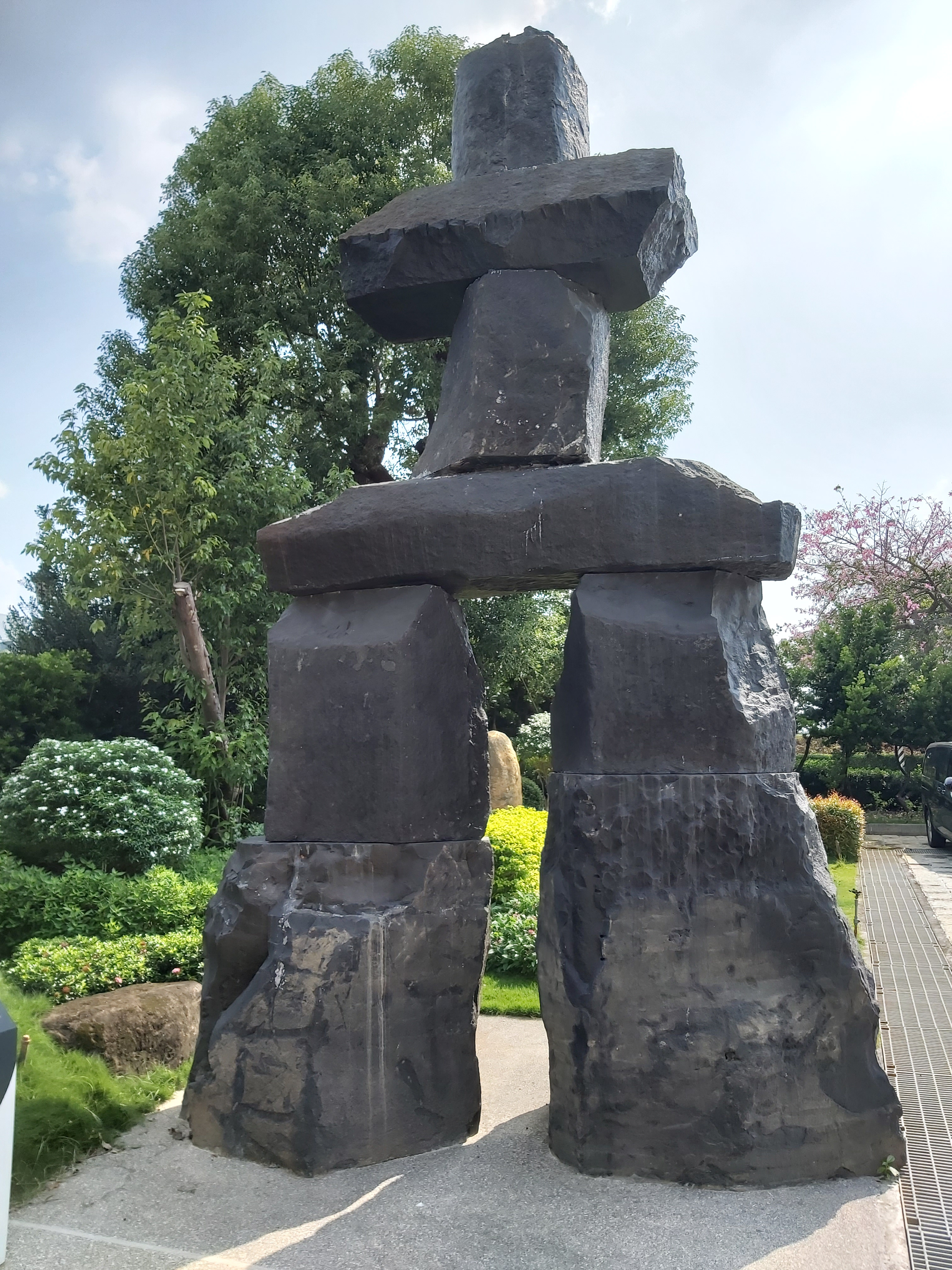
Inuksuk

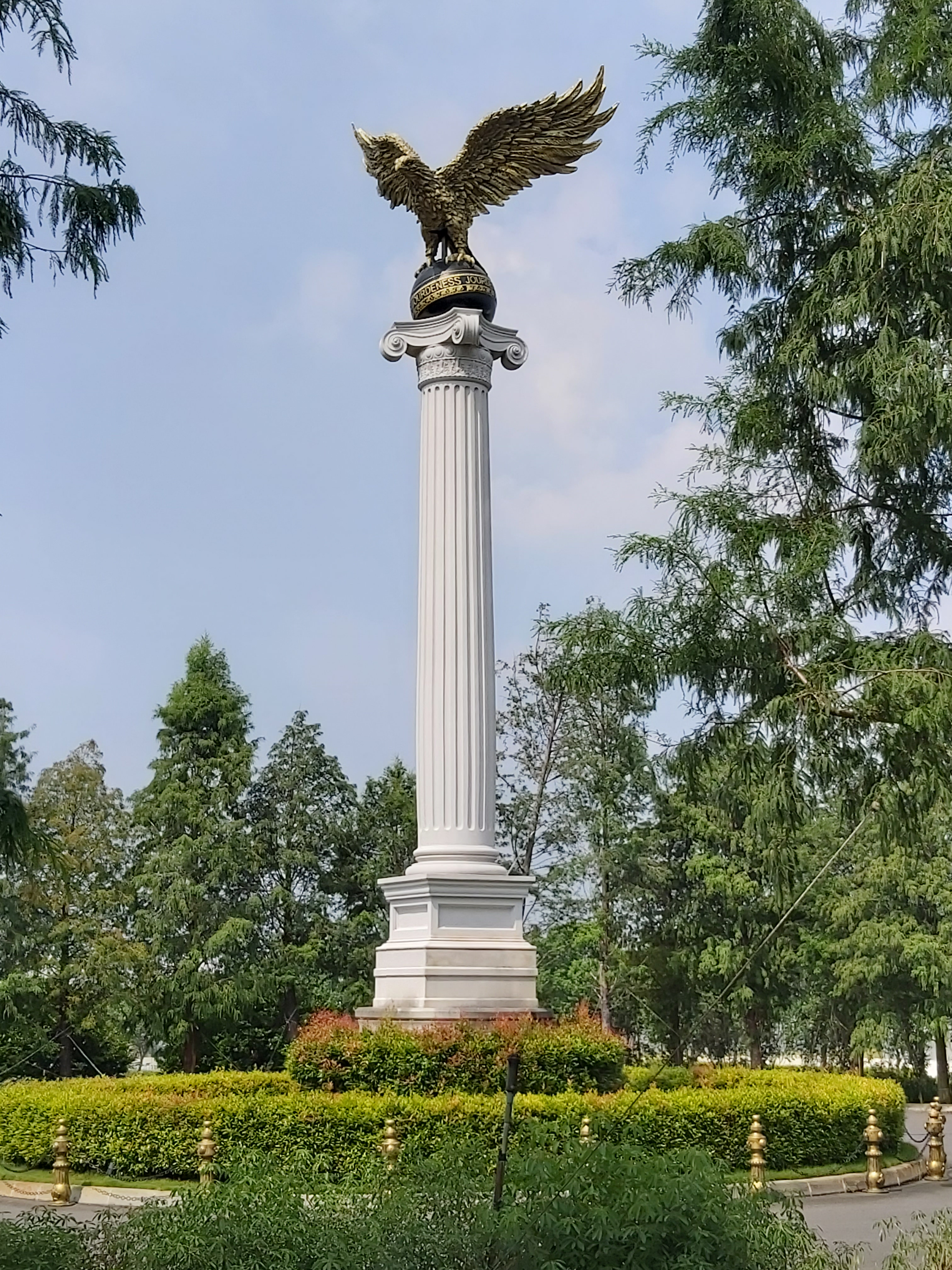
Golden-Eagle Sculpture

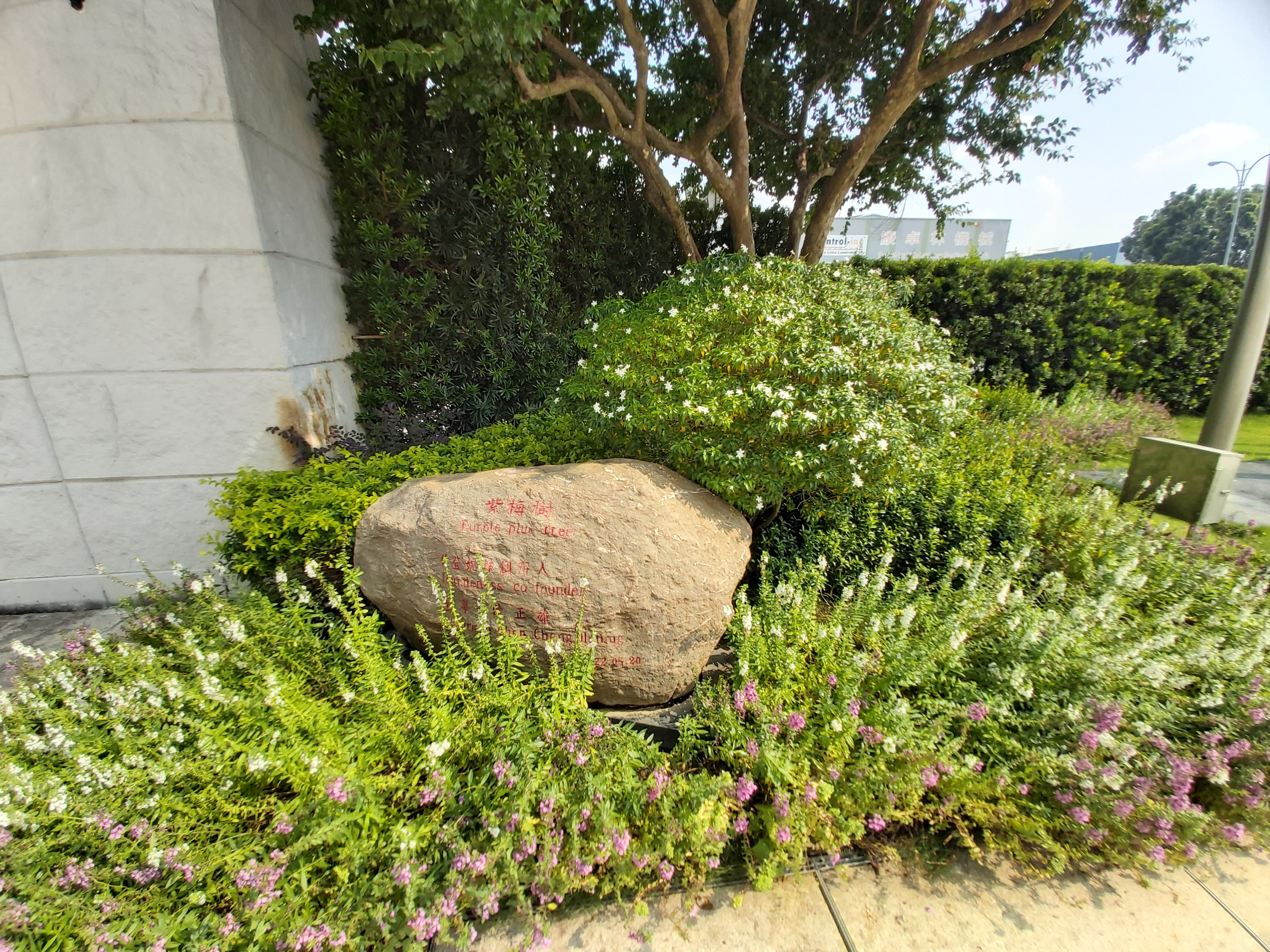
Purple Plum Tree by the founder

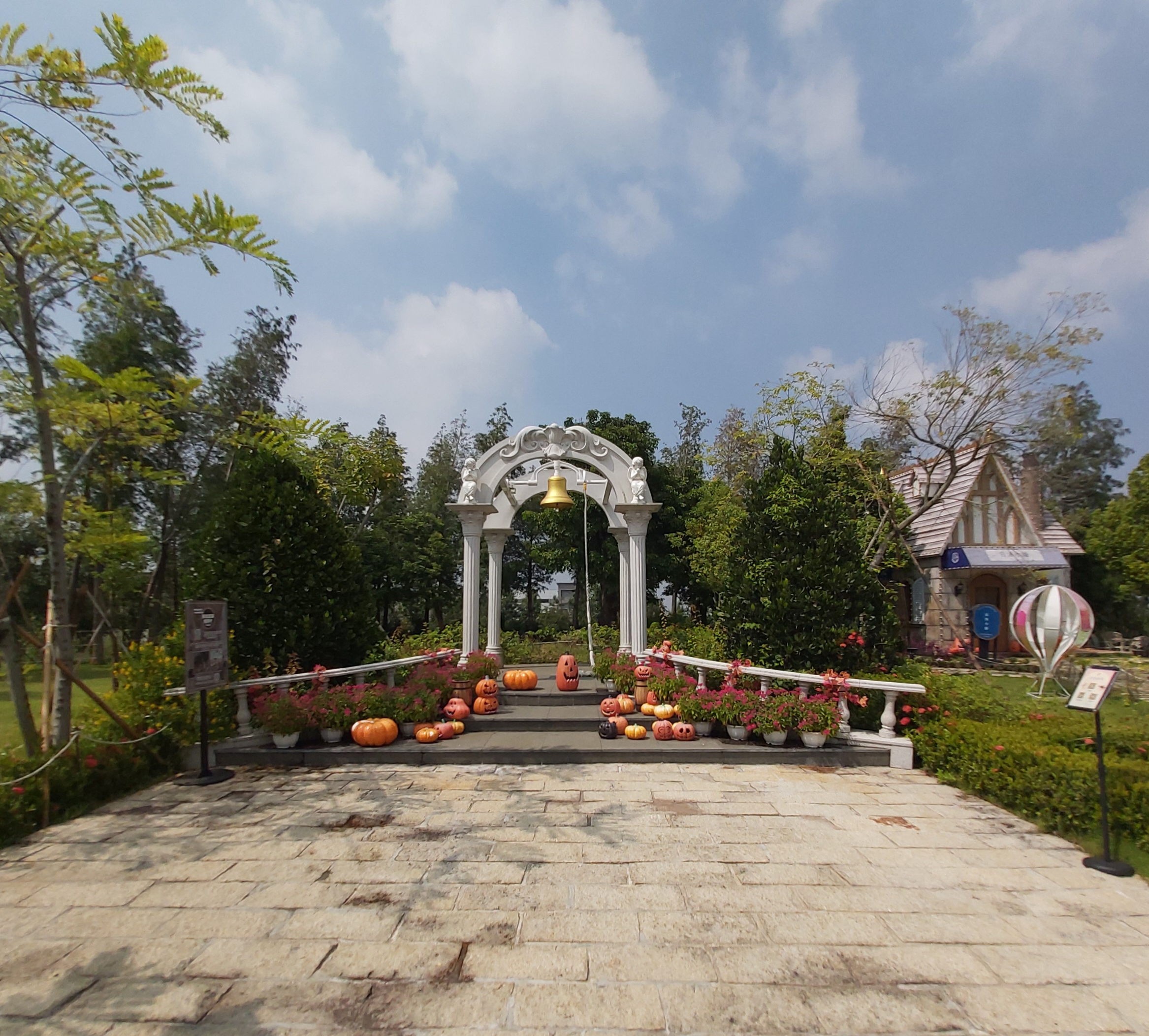
Happiness Bell Tower and Jourdeness Shop

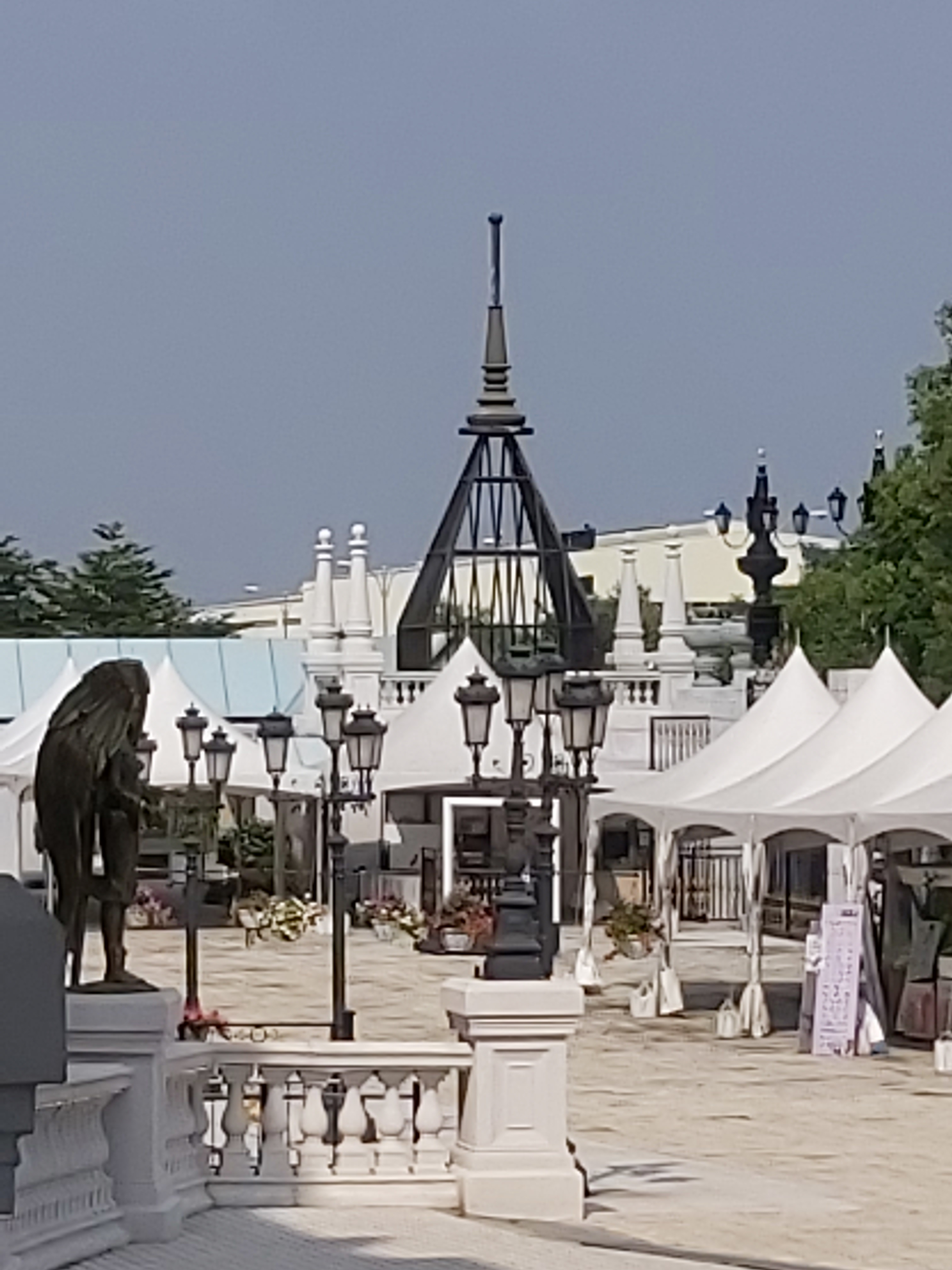
Tticket stand

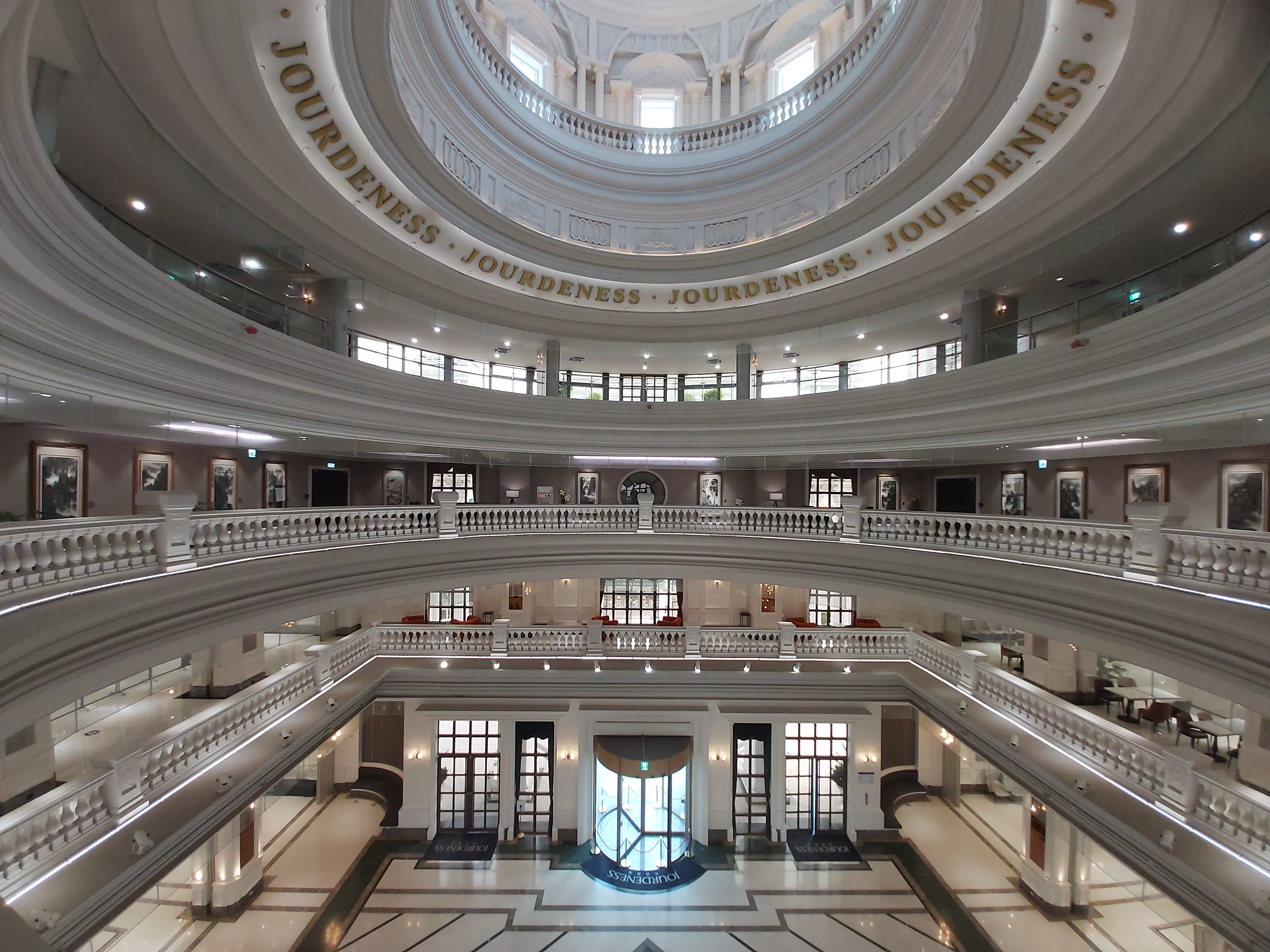
Interior of the Château de Jourdeness

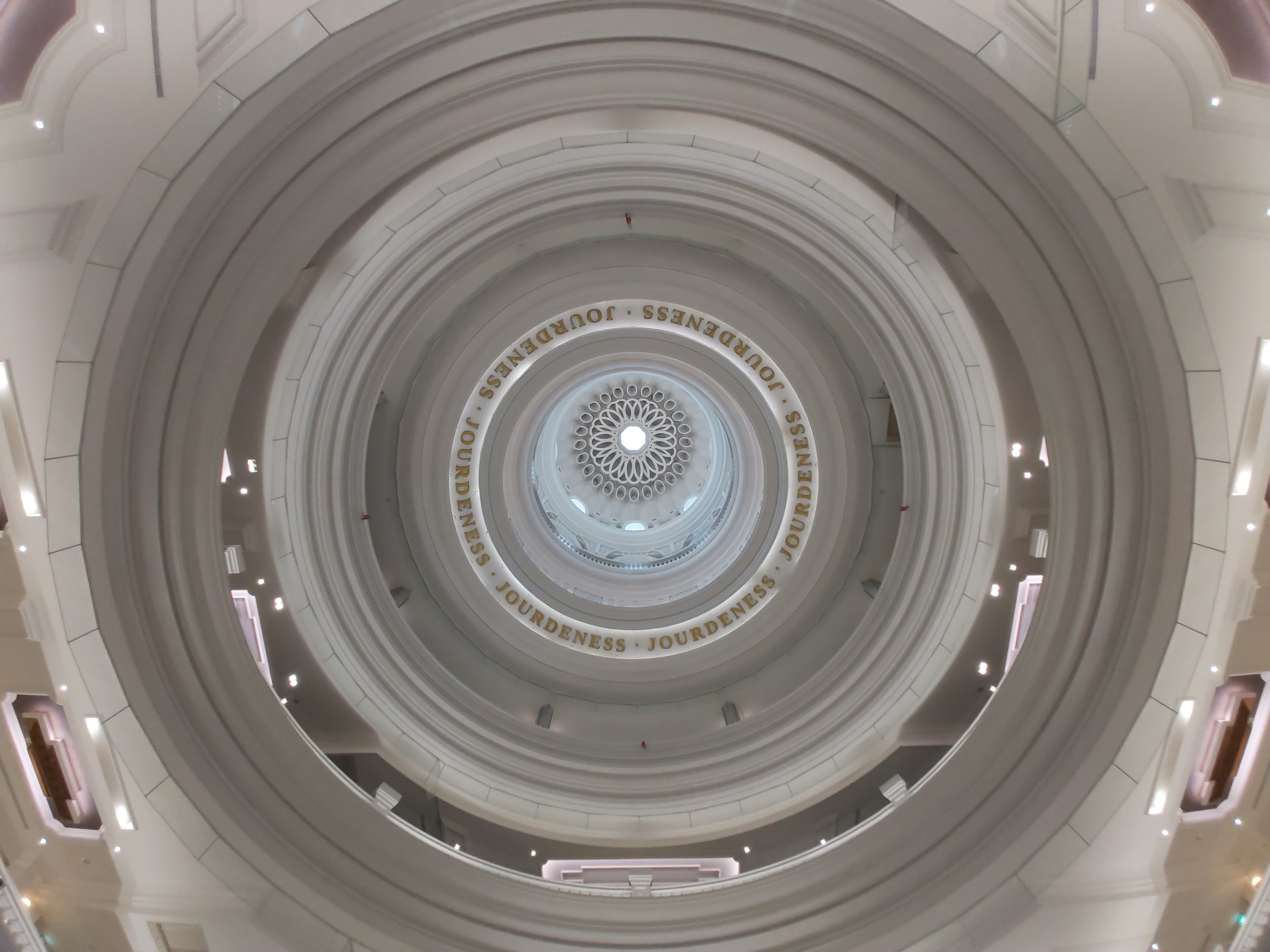
Dome

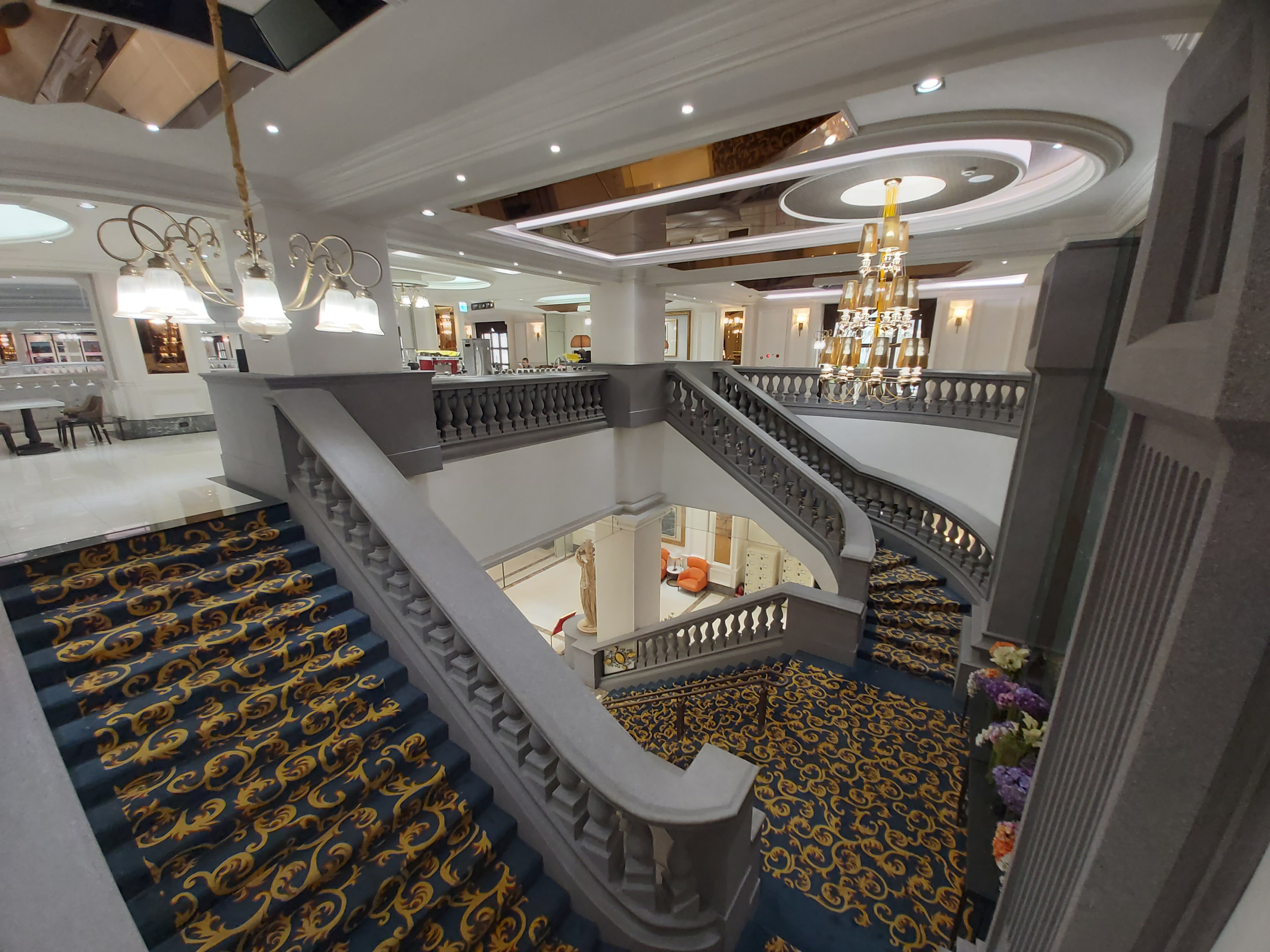
Steps

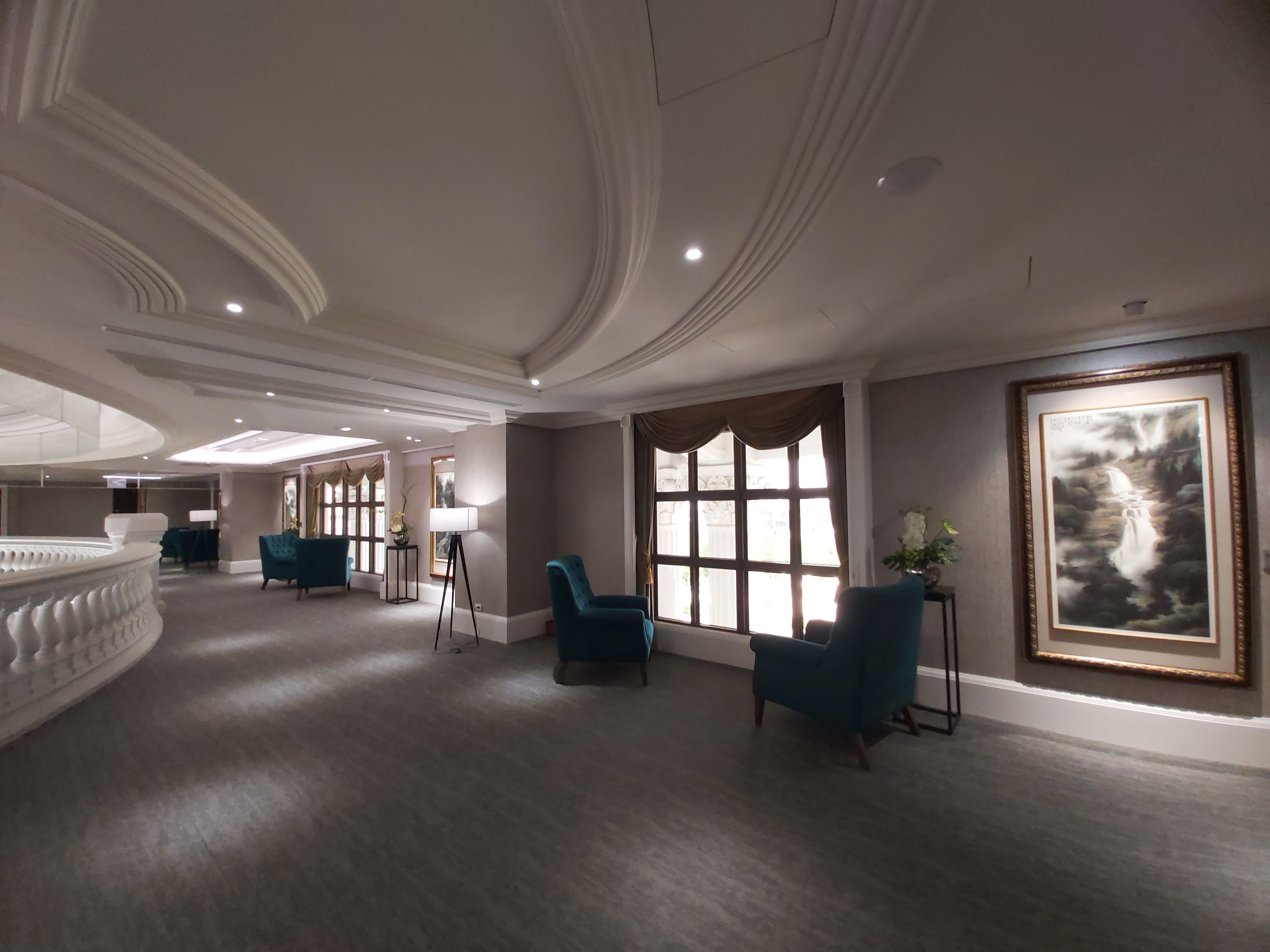
Art Gallery

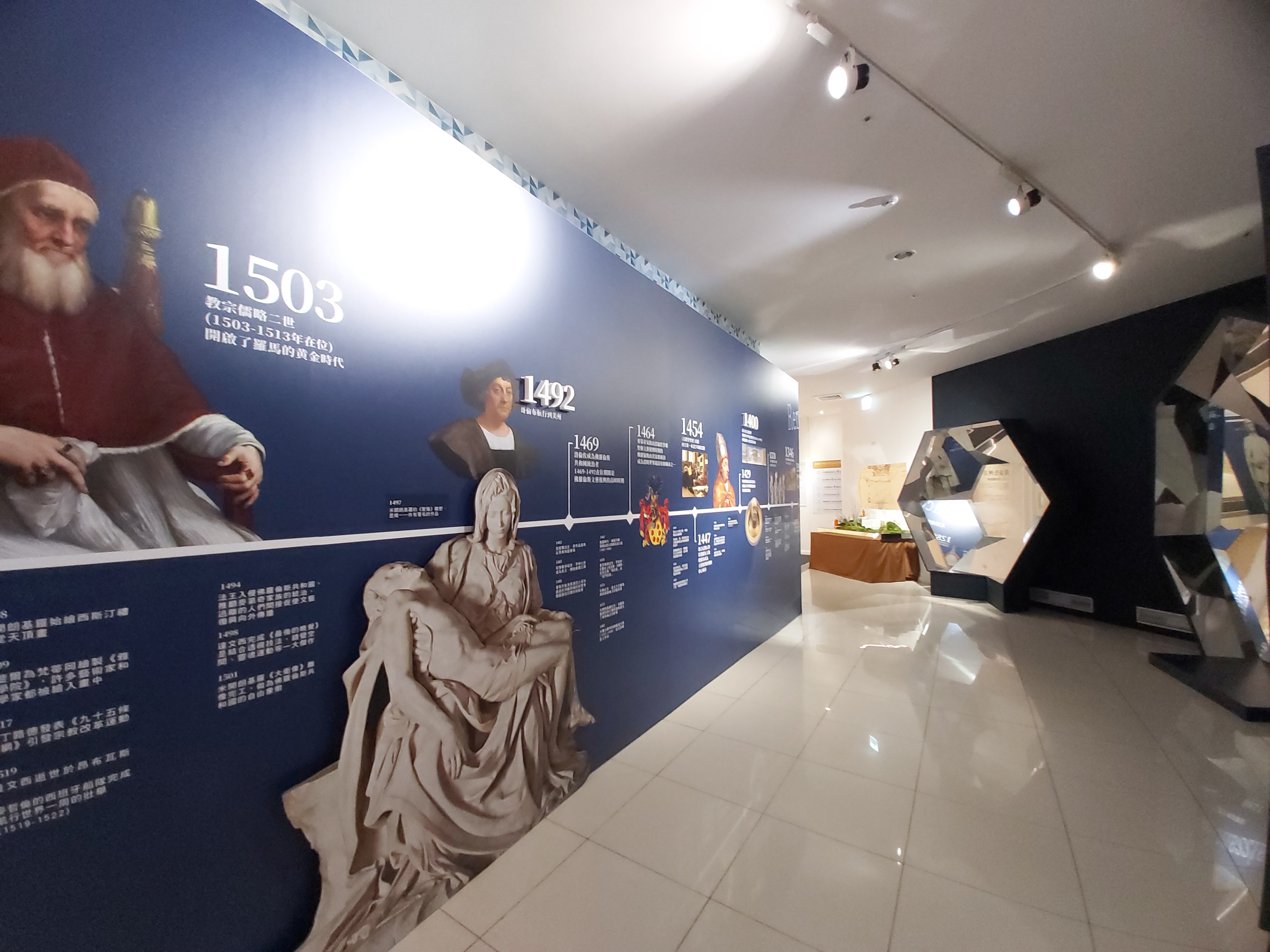
Château de Jourdeness

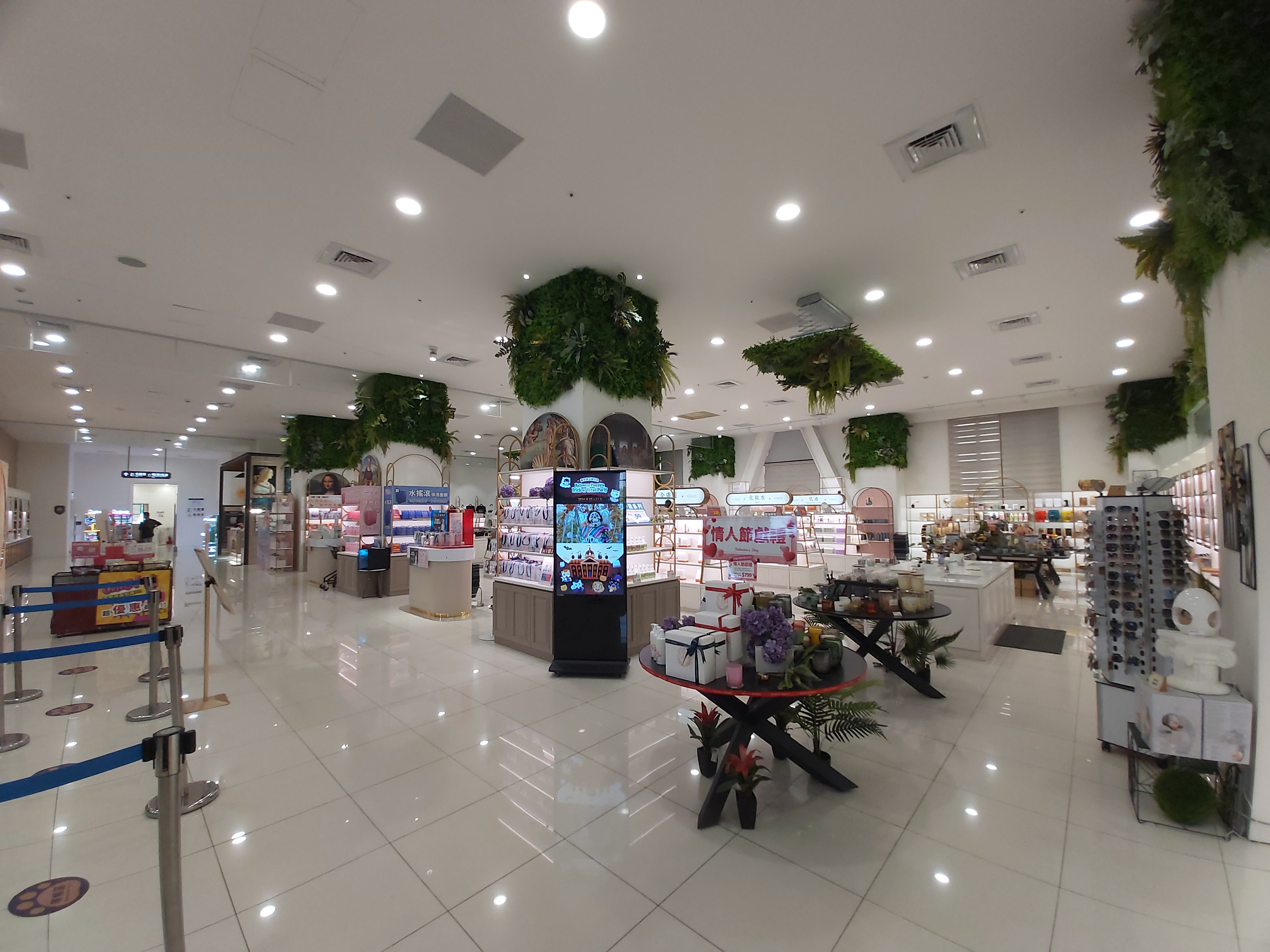
Jenduoste Store

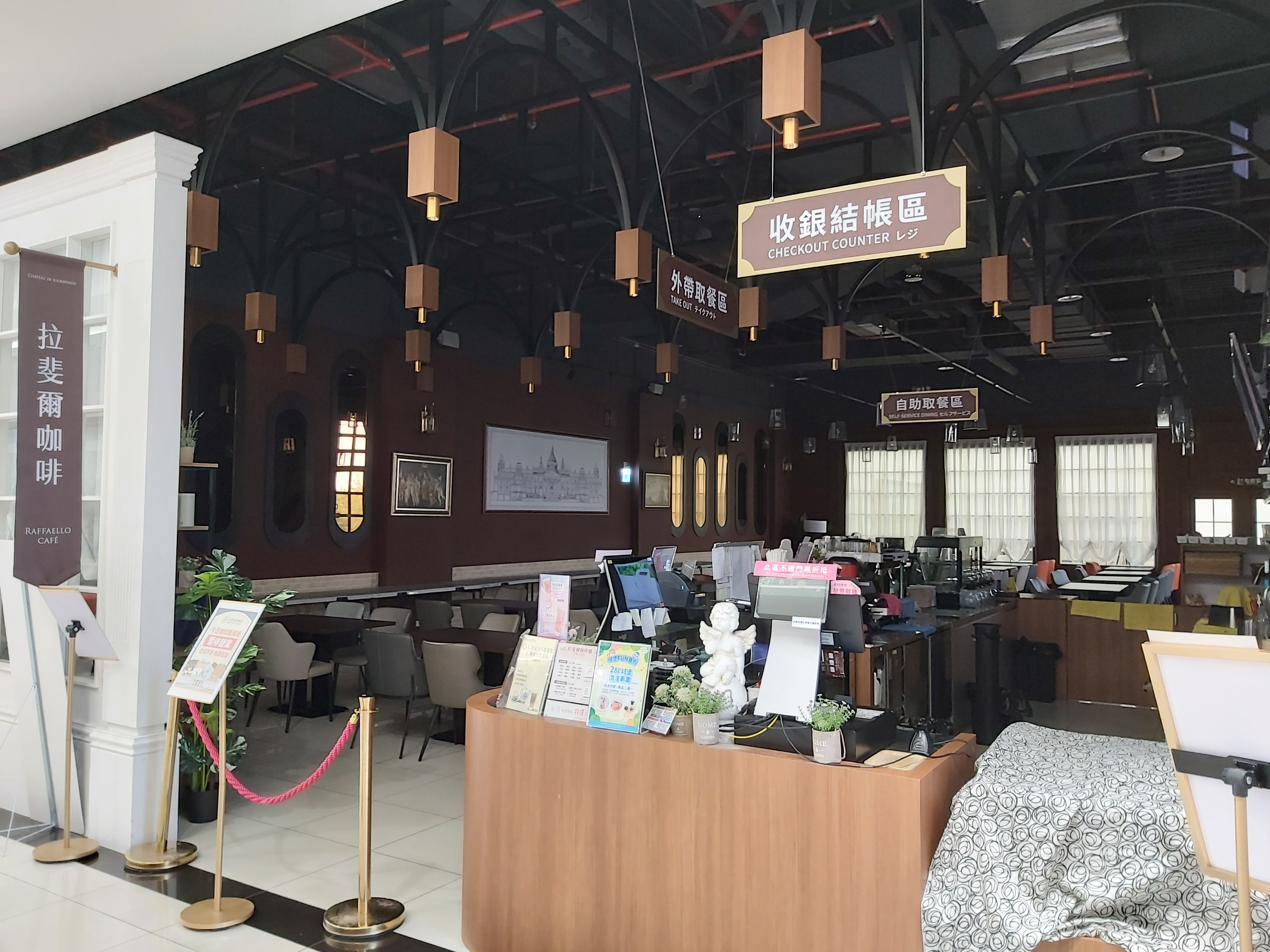
Raffaello Café

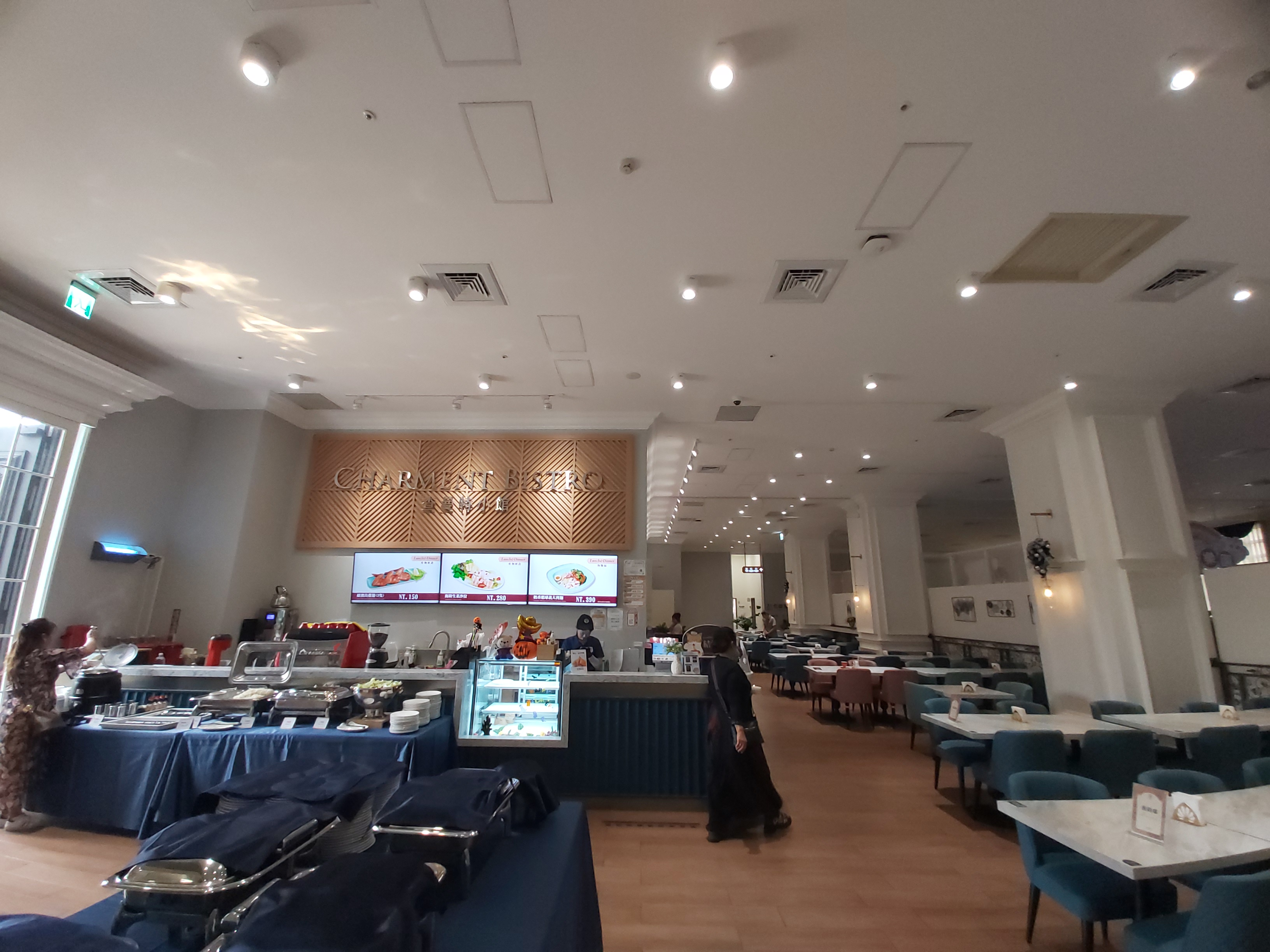
Charment Bistro
