= Dounan, Yunlin =

Urban township in Yunlin, Taiwan

Coordinates: 23°41′N 120°29′E

Dounan Township 斗南鎮 Tonan, Tounan
- Urban township
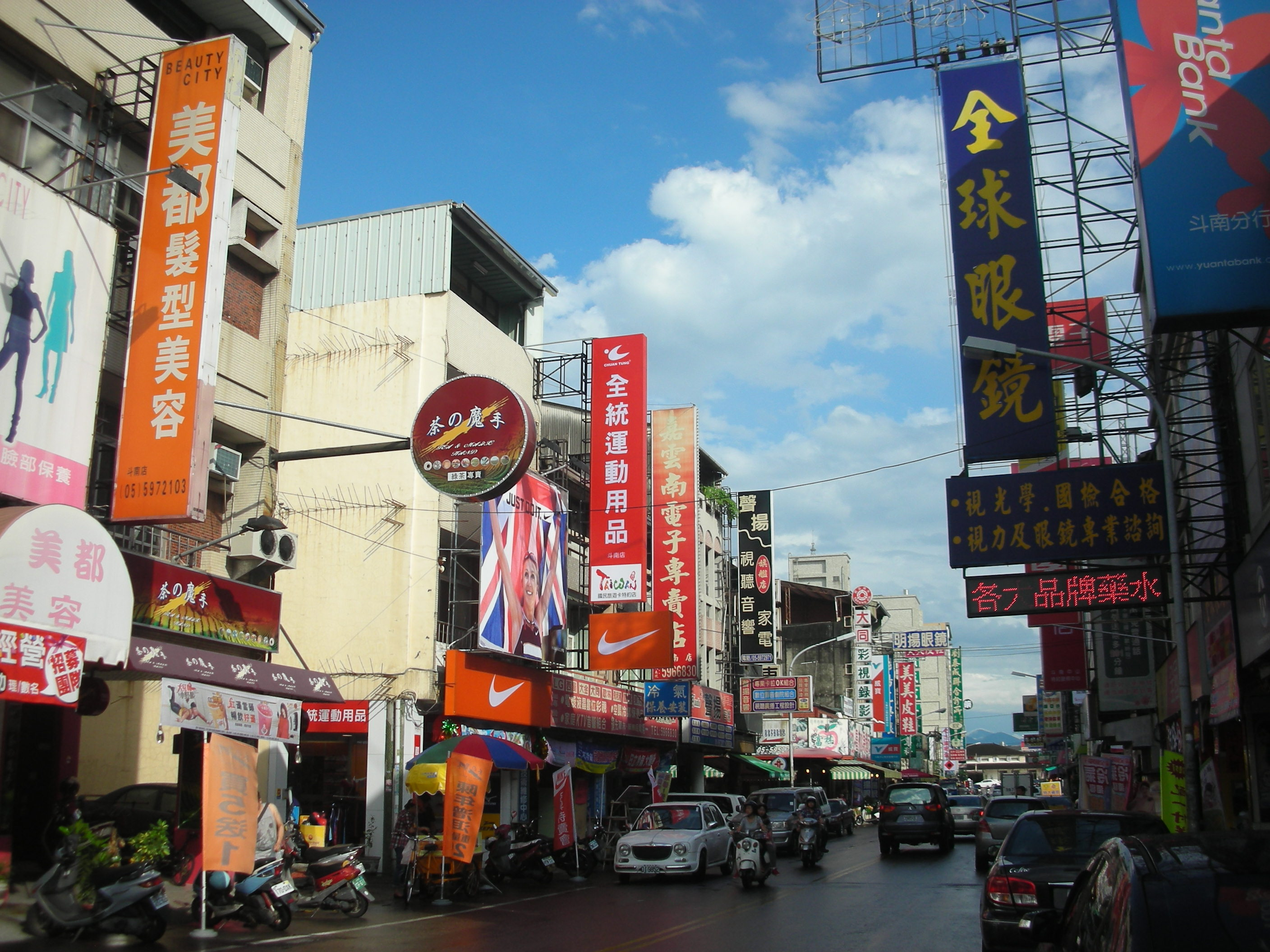

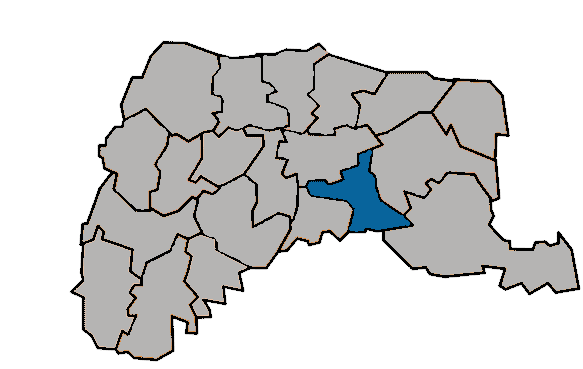
- Dounan Township in Yunlin County
- Location: Yunlin County, Taiwan

Government
  - Mayor: Huang Fu-chung

Area
  - Total: 48 km^{2} (19 sq mi)

Population (February 2023)
  - Total: 43,360
  - Density: 900/km^{2} (2,300/sq mi)
- Website: www.dounan.gov.tw

Dounan Township (Chinese: 斗南鎮; pinyin: Dòunán Zhèn; Tâi-lô: Táu-lâm-tìn) is an urban township in Yunlin County, Taiwan.

== History ==
Dounan was formerly known as Ta-lí-bū (Chinese: 他里霧; pinyin: Tālǐwù), which was derived from Dalivoe, a local settlement of the indigenous Lloa people. The development of Ta-lí-bū had started since the Ming Dynasty, when Koxinga came to Taiwan. It is the first place explored by the Han Chinese in the Yunlin area. During the Japanese rule period, Ta-lí-bū (transliterated to Japanese as Tarimu then) was rebuilt as an administrative division under the governance of Kobi and renamed to Tonan in 1920. In 1946, it became an independent township.

== Geography ==
Dounan is located on a plain with flat terrain. The elevation of the township is 33 meters above sea level and it inclines from east to west.

== Administrative divisions ==
Tungren, Xiqi, Nanchang, Beiming, Zhongtian, Linzi, Shigui, Shixi, Jingxing, Xinnan, Adan, Jiangjun, Jiushe, Mingchang, Datung, Beima, Xiba, Xinlun, Tungming, Xinguang, Tiantou and Xiaotung Village.

== Economy ==
Most of the land use in Dounan is for agriculture, which makes up about 10.4 km^{2}. The majority of the business in the township is low-level service, in which most of them are retail stores.

== Tourist attractions ==
- Dounan Stadium
- Yunlin County Stadium

== Transportation ==
Dounan is the transport center for Yunlin County.

- National Freeway 1 Dounan Interchange (斗南交流道)
- Taiwan Railway
  - Dounan Station
  - Shigui Station
