= Dounan railway station =

Railway station in Yunlin, Taiwan

Dounan 斗南車站
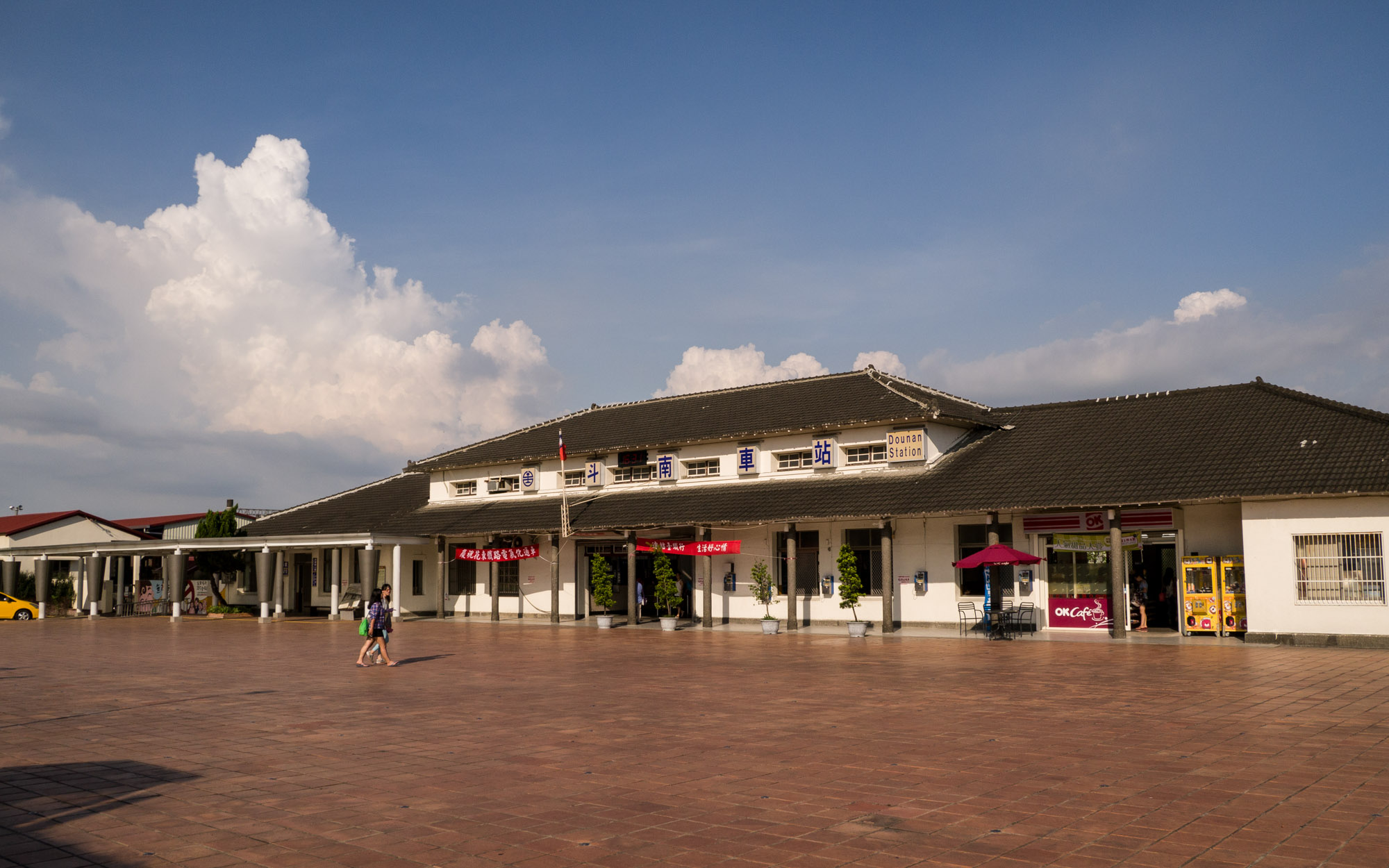

General information
- Location: No. 2, Zhongshan Rd., Nanchang Vill., Dounan, Yunlin, Taiwan
- Coordinates: 23°40′24.2″N 120°28′50.3″E
- System: Train station
- Owner: Taiwan Railway Corporation
- Operator: Taiwan Railway Corporation
- Line: Western Trunk line
- Train operators: Taiwan Railway Corporation

History
- Opened: 15 December 1903

Passengers
- 4,079 daily (2024)
Location

Dounan (Chinese: 斗南車站; pinyin: Dòunán Chēzhàn) is a railway station on the Taiwan Railway West Coast line located in Dounan Township, Yunlin County, Taiwan.

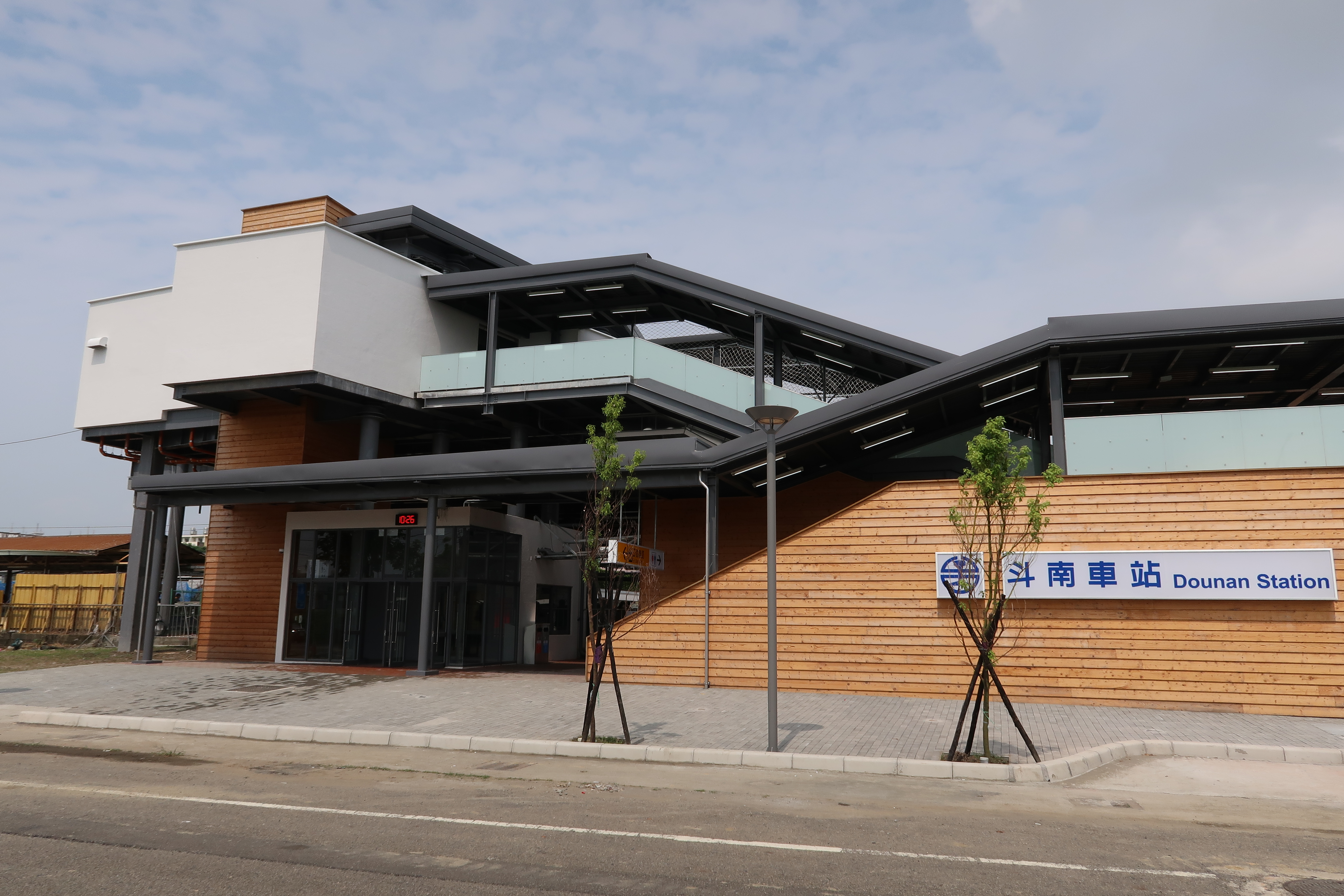
Dounan station Xinyi Road exit

== History ==
The station was opened on 15 December 1903.

== Architecture ==
The station was built with a mix of Japanese and Western-style architecture.

== Around the station ==
- Honey Museum

== See also ==
- List of railway stations in Taiwan

Preceding station	Taiwan Railway	Following station
Douliu towards Keelung	Western Trunk line	Shigui towards Pingtung
